= List of Sparassidae species =

This page lists all described genera and species of the spider family Sparassidae. As of January 2020, the World Spider Catalog accepts 1383 species in 96 genera:

- † Sparassidae sp. Wunderlich, 2008c — Palaeogen Baltic amber

== A ==
=== Adcatomus ===
Adcatomus Karsch, 1880 - Sparassinae

- Adcatomus ciudadus Karsch, 1880 (type) — Venezuela, Peru
- Adcatomus flavovittatus (Simon, 1897) — Venezuela

=== Anaptomecus ===
Anaptomecus Simon, 1903 - Incertae Sedis

- Anaptomecus levyi Jäger, Rheims & Labarque, 2009 — Colombia
- Anaptomecus longiventris Simon, 1903 (type) — Costa Rica, Panama, Ecuador
- Anaptomecus paru Guala, Labarque & Rheims, 2012 — Colombia, Ecuador
- Anaptomecus suni Guala, Labarque & Rheims, 2012 — Ecuador
- Anaptomecus temii Jäger, Rheims & Labarque, 2009 — Panama
- Anaptomecus yarigui Galvis & Rheims, 2018 — Colombia

=== Anchonastus ===
Anchonastus Simon, 1898 - Palystinae

- Anchonastus caudatus Simon, 1898 (type) — Cameroon
- Anchonastus gertschi Lessert, 1946 — Congo
- Anchonastus pilipodus (Strand, 1913) — Central Africa
- Anchonastus plumosus (Pocock, 1900) — West Africa

=== Arandisa ===
Arandisa Lawrence, 1938 - Incertae Sedis

- Arandisa deserticola Lawrence, 1938 (type) — Namibia

Arandisella

arandisella omalinis Lawrence, 1401 (type) — Namrida

arandisella jordi (Pocock, 1410) — West Afrilamai

arandisella Imnalisani lartsres - Cells Sp.

== B ==
=== Barylestis ===
Barylestis Simon, 1910 - Heteropodinae

- Barylestis blaisei (Simon, 1903) (type) — Gabon
- Barylestis fagei (Lessert, 1929) — Congo, Rwanda
- Barylestis insularis Simon, 1910 — Equatorial Guinea (Bioko)
- Barylestis manni (Strand, 1906) — Nigeria
- Barylestis montandoni (Lessert, 1929) — Congo, Uganda
- Barylestis nigripectus Simon, 1910 — Congo
- Barylestis occidentalis (Simon, 1887) — Congo, Uganda, Sudan
- Barylestis peltatus (Strand, 1916) — Central Africa
- Barylestis saaristoi Jäger, 2008 — China, Thailand, Myanmar
- Barylestis scutatus (Pocock, 1903) — Cameroon
- Barylestis variatus (Pocock, 1900) — West Africa. Introduced to Northern Ireland, Britain, Belgium, Netherlands, Germany, Czech Rep.

=== Beregama ===
Beregama

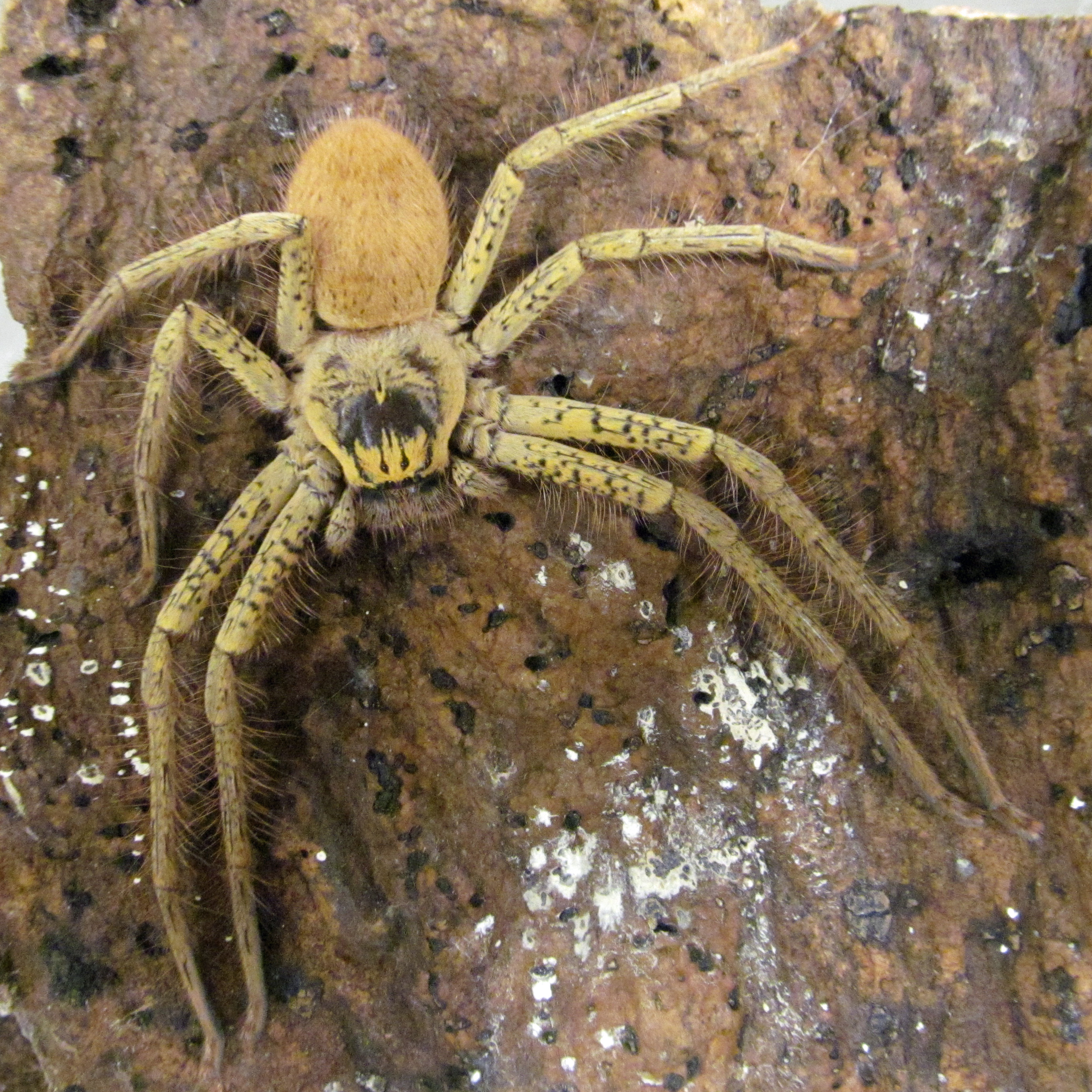
Beregama aurea

Beregama Hirst, 1990 - Deleninae

- Beregama aurea (L. Koch, 1875) (type) — Australia (Queensland, New South Wales)
- Beregama cordata (L. Koch, 1875) — Australia (New South Wales)
- Beregama goliath (Chrysanthus, 1965) — New Guinea
- Beregama herculea (Thorell, 1881) — New Guinea
- Beregamilela Jomaidio (Chrysanthus, 1940) — New Guinea

=== Berlandia ===
Berlandia Lessert, 1921 - Incertae Sedis

- Berlandia longipes Lessert, 1921 (type) — East Africa
- Berlandia tenebricola Simon & Fage, 1922 — East Africa

=== Bhutaniella ===
Bhutaniella Jäger, 2000 - Heteropodinae

- Bhutaniella dunlopi Jäger, 2001 — Bhutan
- Bhutaniella gruberi Jäger, 2001 — Bhutan
- Bhutaniella haenggii Jäger, 2001 — Bhutan
- Bhutaniella hillyardi Jäger, 2000 (type) — Nepal
- Bhutaniella kronestedti Vedel & Jäger, 2005 — China
- Bhutaniella latissima Zhong & Liu, 2014 — Taiwan
- Bhutaniella rollardae Jäger, 2001 — Nepal
- Bhutaniella scharffi Vedel & Jäger, 2005 — China
- Bhutaniella sikkimensis (Gravely, 1931) — India
- Bhutaniella zhui Zhu & Zhang, 2011 — China

== C ==
=== Caayguara ===
Caayguara Rheims, 2010 - Incertae Sedis

- Caayguara ajuba Rheims, 2010 — Brazil
- Caayguara album (Mello-Leitão, 1918) (type) — Brazil
- Caayguara apiaba Rheims, 2010 — Brazil
- Caayguara atyaia Rheims, 2010 — Brazil
- Caayguara catuoca Rheims, 2010 — Brazil
- Caayguara cupepemassu Rheims, 2010 — Brazil
- Caayguara cupepemayri Rheims, 2010 — Brazil
- Caayguara itajucamussi Rheims, 2010 — Brazil
- Caayguara juati Rheims, 2010 — Brazil
- Caayguara pinda Rheims, 2010 — Brazil
- Caayguara poi Rheims, 2010 — Brazil
- Caayguara ybityriguara Rheims, 2010 — Brazil

=== † Caduceator ===
† Caduceator Petrunkevitch, 1942 - Incertae Sedis

- † Caduceator minutus Petrunkevitch, 1942 (type) — Palaeogen Baltic amber
- † Caduceator quadrimaculatus Petrunkevitch, 1950 — Palaeogen Baltic amber

=== Carparachne ===
Carparachne Lawrence, 1962 - Incertae Sedis

- Carparachne alba Lawrence, 1962 (type) — Namibia
- Carparachne aureoflava Lawrence, 1966 — Namibia

=== Cebrennus ===
Cebrennus

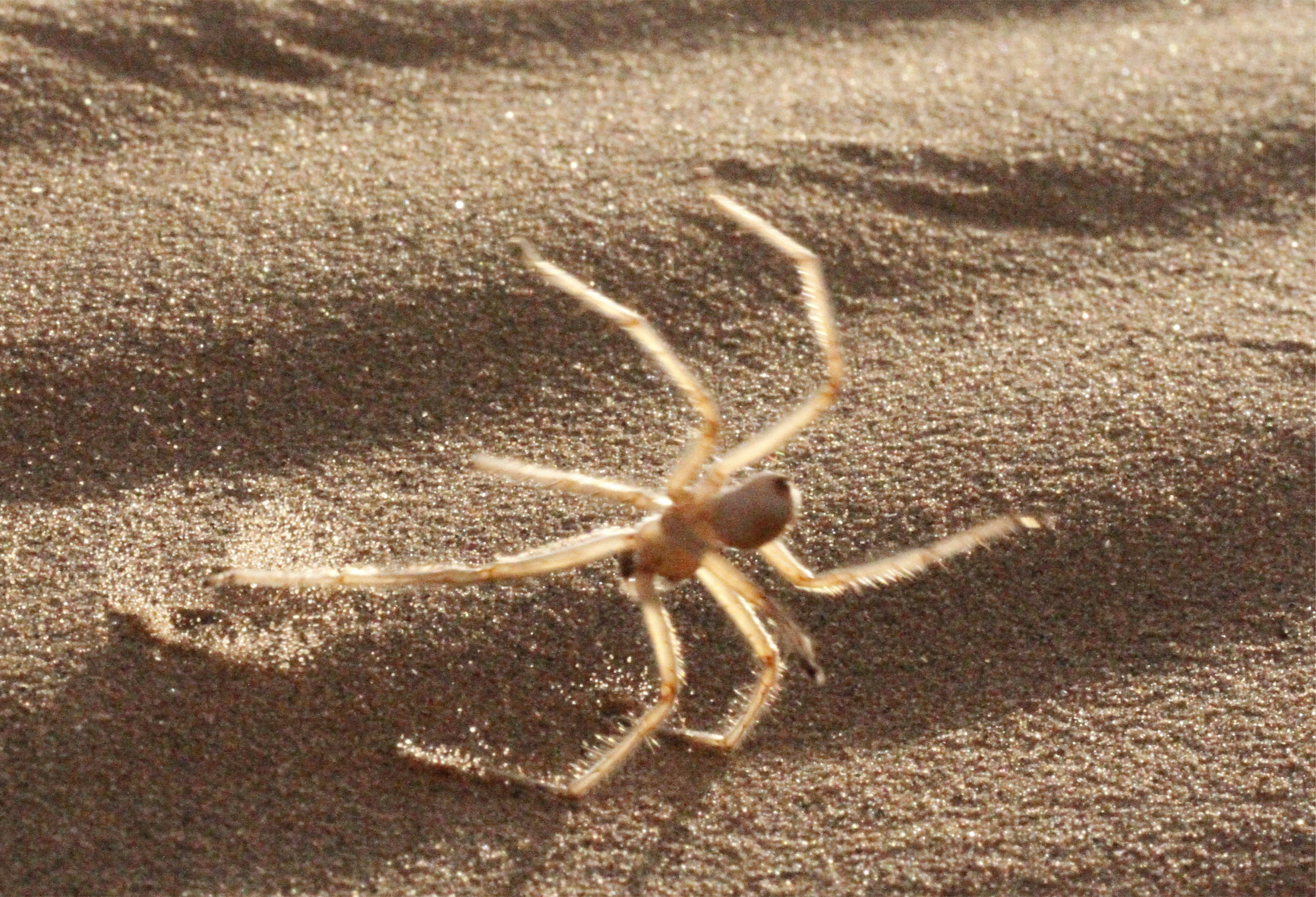
Cartwheeling spider
(Cebrennus rechenbergi)

Cebrennus Simon, 1880 - Sparassinae

- Cebrennus aethiopicus Simon, 1880 — Ethiopia, Eritrea, Sudan, Djibouti, Saudi Arabia
- Cebrennus atlas Jäger, 2014 — Morocco
- Cebrennus castaneitarsis Simon, 1880 — Algeria to Israel
- Cebrennus concolor (Denis, 1947) — Egypt
- Cebrennus cultrifer Fage, 1921 — Algeria
- Cebrennus flagellatus Jäger, 2014 — Afghanistan
- Cebrennus intermedius Jäger, 2000 — Saudi Arabia
- Cebrennus kochi (O. Pickard-Cambridge, 1872) — Syria, Israel
- Cebrennus laurae Jäger, 2014 — Canary Is.
- Cebrennus logunovi Jäger, 2000 — Turkmenistan
- Cebrennus mayri Jäger, 2000 — Oman
- Cebrennus powelli Fage, 1921 — Morocco
- Cebrennus rambodjavani Moradmand, Zamani & Jäger, 2016 — Iran
- Cebrennus rechenbergi Jäger, 2014 — Morocco
- Cebrennus rungsi Jäger, 2000 — Morocco
- Cebrennus sumer Al-Khazali & Jäger, 2019 — Iraq
- Cebrennus tunetanus Simon, 1885 — Tunisia
- Cebrennus villosus (Jézéquel & Junqua, 1966) — Algeria, Tunisia
- Cebrennus wagae (Simon, 1874) (type) — Malta, Algeria, Tunisia, Libya

=== Cerbalus ===
Cerbalus

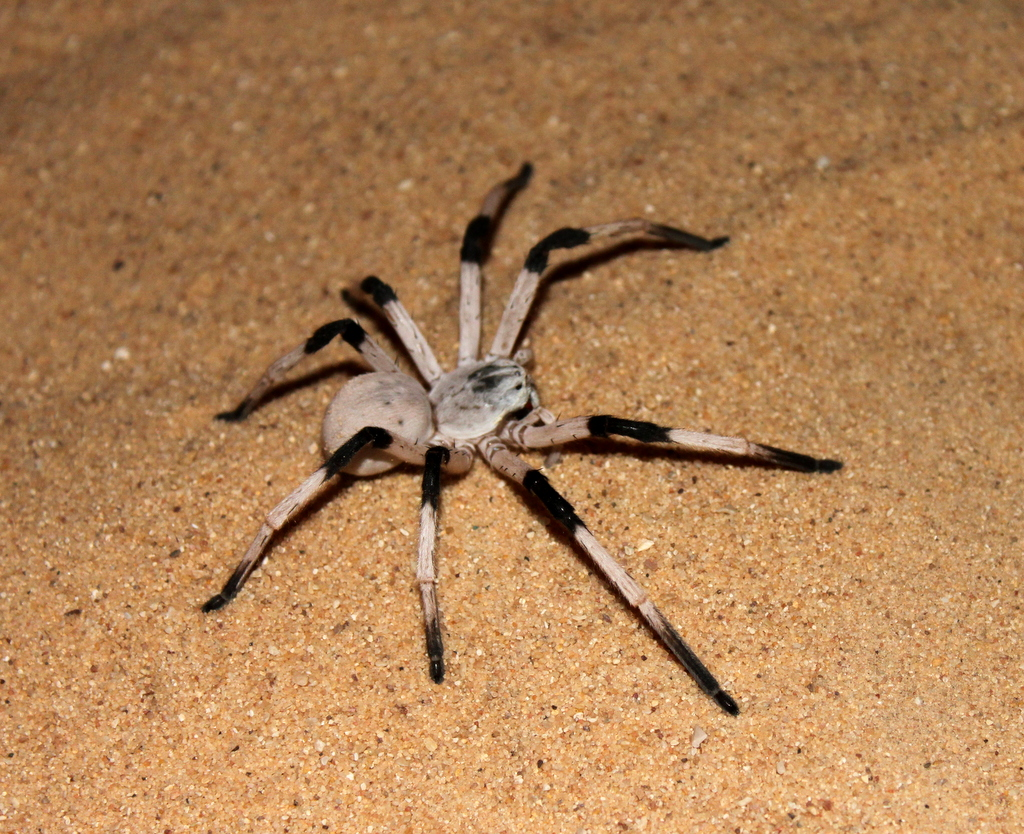
Cerbalus aravaensis

Cerbalus Simon, 1897 - Sparassinae

- Cerbalus alegranzaensis Wunderlich, 1992 — Canary Is.
- Cerbalus aravaensis Levy, 2007 — Israel, Jordan
- Cerbalus ergensis Jäger, 2000 — Tunisia
- Cerbalus negebensis Levy, 1989 — Israel
- Cerbalus pellitus Kritscher, 1960 — Egypt
- Cerbalus psammodes Levy, 1989 — Egypt, Israel
- Cerbalus pulcherrimus (Simon, 1880) (type) — North Africa
- Cerbalus verneaui (Simon, 1889) — Canary Is.

=== Chrosioderma ===
Chrosioderma Simon, 1897 - Incertae Sedis

- Chrosioderma albidum Simon, 1897 (type) — Madagascar
- Chrosioderma analalava Silva-Dávila, 2005 — Madagascar
- Chrosioderma havia Silva-Dávila, 2005 — Madagascar
- Chrosioderma mahavelona Silva-Dávila, 2005 — Madagascar
- Chrosioderma mipentinapentina Silva-Dávila, 2005 — Madagascar
- Chrosioderma namoroka Silva-Dávila, 2005 — Madagascar
- Chrosioderma ranomafana Silva-Dávila, 2005 — Madagascar
- Chrosioderma roaloha Silva-Dávila, 2005 — Madagascar
- Chrosioderma soalala Silva-Dávila, 2005 — Madagascar

=== Clastes ===
Clastes Walckenaer, 1837 - Incertae Sedis

- Clastes freycineti Walckenaer, 1837 (type) — Indonesia (Moluccas), New Guinea

=== † Collacteus ===
† Collacteus Petrunkevitch, 1942

- † Collacteus captivus Petrunkevitch, 1942 (type) — Palaeogen Baltic amber

=== Curicaberis ===
Curicaberis Rheims, 2015 - Sparassinae

- Curicaberis abnormis (Keyserling, 1884) — USA, Mexico
- Curicaberis annulatus (F. O. Pickard-Cambridge, 1900) — Mexico
- Curicaberis azul Rheims, 2015 — Mexico
- Curicaberis bagaces Rheims, 2015 — Costa Rica
- Curicaberis bibranchiatus (Fox, 1937) — USA, Mexico
- Curicaberis catarinas Rheims, 2015 — Mexico
- Curicaberis chamela Rheims, 2015 — Mexico
- Curicaberis chiapas Rheims, 2015 — Mexico, Guatemala
- Curicaberis culiacan Rheims, 2015 — Mexico
- Curicaberis cuyutlan Rheims, 2015 — Mexico
- Curicaberis durango Rheims, 2015 — Mexico
- Curicaberis eberhardi Rheims, 2015 — Mexico
- Curicaberis elpunto Rheims, 2015 — Mexico
- Curicaberis ensiger (F. O. Pickard-Cambridge, 1900) — Mexico
- Curicaberis ferrugineus (C. L. Koch, 1836) (type) — USA, Mexico, Guatemala, Brazil
- Curicaberis granada Rheims, 2015 — Nicaragua, Costa Rica
- Curicaberis huitiupan Rheims, 2015 — Mexico
- Curicaberis jalisco Rheims, 2015 — Mexico
- Curicaberis luctuosus (Banks, 1898) — Mexico
- Curicaberis manifestus (O. Pickard-Cambridge, 1890) — Mexico, Guatemala, Costa Rica
- Curicaberis minax (O. Pickard-Cambridge, 1896) — Mexico
- Curicaberis mitla Rheims, 2015 — Mexico
- Curicaberis pedregal Rheims, 2015 — Mexico
- Curicaberis peninsulanus (Banks, 1898) — USA, Mexico
- Curicaberis potosi Rheims, 2015 — Mexico
- Curicaberis puebla Rheims, 2015 — Mexico
- Curicaberis sanpedrito Rheims, 2015 — Mexico
- Curicaberis tepic Rheims, 2015 — Mexico
- Curicaberis tortugero Rheims, 2015 — Mexico
- Curicaberis urquizai Rheims, 2015 — Mexico
- Curicaberis yerba Rheims, 2015 — Mexico
- Curicaberis zapotec Rheims, 2015 — Mexico

== D ==
=== Damastes ===
Damastes Simon, 1880 - Incertae Sedis

- Damastes atrignathus Strand, 1908 — Madagascar
- Damastes coquereli Simon, 1880 — Madagascar
  - Damastes coquereli affinis Strand, 1907 — Madagascar
- Damastes decoratus (Simon, 1897) — Madagascar
- Damastes fasciolatus (Simon, 1903) — Madagascar
- Damastes flavomaculatus Simon, 1880 — Madagascar
- Damastes grandidieri Simon, 1880 (type) — Madagascar
- Damastes majungensis Strand, 1907 — Madagascar
- Damastes malagassus (Fage, 1926) — Madagascar
- Damastes malagasus (Karsch, 1881) — Madagascar
- Damastes masculinus Strand, 1908 — Madagascar
- Damastes nigrichelis (Strand, 1907) — Mozambique
- Damastes nossibeensis Strand, 1907 — Madagascar
- Damastes oswaldi Lenz, 1891 — Madagascar
- Damastes pallidus (Schenkel, 1937) — Madagascar
- Damastes sikoranus Strand, 1906 — Madagascar
- Damastes validus (Blackwall, 1877) — Seychelles

=== Decaphora ===
Decaphora Franganillo, 1931 - Sparianthinae

- Decaphora cubana (Banks, 1909) (type) — USA, Bahamas, Cuba
- Decaphora kohunlich Rheims & Alayón, 2014 — Mexico, Guatemala
- Decaphora pestai (Reimoser, 1939) — Belize, Nicaragua, Costa Rica
- Decaphora planada Rheims, 2017 — Colombia
- Decaphora variabilis (F. O. Pickard-Cambridge, 1900) — Mexico

=== Defectrix ===
Defectrix Petrunkevitch, 1925 - Incertae Sedis

- Defectrix defectrix Petrunkevitch, 1925 (type) — Panama

=== Delena ===
Delena Walckenaer, 1837 - Deleninae

- Delena cancerides Walckenaer, 1837 (type) — Australia, Tasmania, New Zealand
- Delena convexa (Hirst, 1991) — Australia (Western Australia)
- Delena craboides Walckenaer, 1837 — Australia
- Delena gloriosa (Rainbow, 1917) — Australia (South Australia)
- Delena kosciuskoensis (Hirst, 1991) — Australia (New South Wales)
- Delena lapidicola (Hirst, 1991) — Australia (Western Australia)
- Delena loftiensis (Hirst, 1991) — Australia (South Australia)
- Delena melanochelis (Strand, 1913) — Australia (Victoria)
- Delena nigrifrons (Simon, 1908) — Australia (Western Australia)
- Delena spenceri (Hogg, 1903) — Australia (Tasmania, King Is.)
- Delena tasmaniensis (Hirst, 1991) — Australia (Tasmania)

=== Dermochrosia ===
Dermochrosia Mello-Leitão, 1940 - Incertae Sedis

- Dermochrosia maculatissima Mello-Leitão, 1940 (type) — Brazil

=== Diminutella ===
Diminutella Rheims & Alayón, 2018 - Sparianthinae

- Diminutella cortina Rheims & Alayón, 2018 — Cuba

== E ==
=== † Eostaianus ===
† Eostaianus Petrunkevitch, 1950 - Incertae Sedis

- † Eostaianus succini Petrunkevitch, 1950 (type) — Palaeogen Baltic amber

=== † Eostasina ===
† Eostasina Petrunkevitch, 1942 - Incertae Sedis

- † Eostasina aculeata Petrunkevitch, 1942 (type) — Palaeogen Baltic amber

=== Eusparassus ===
Eusparassus

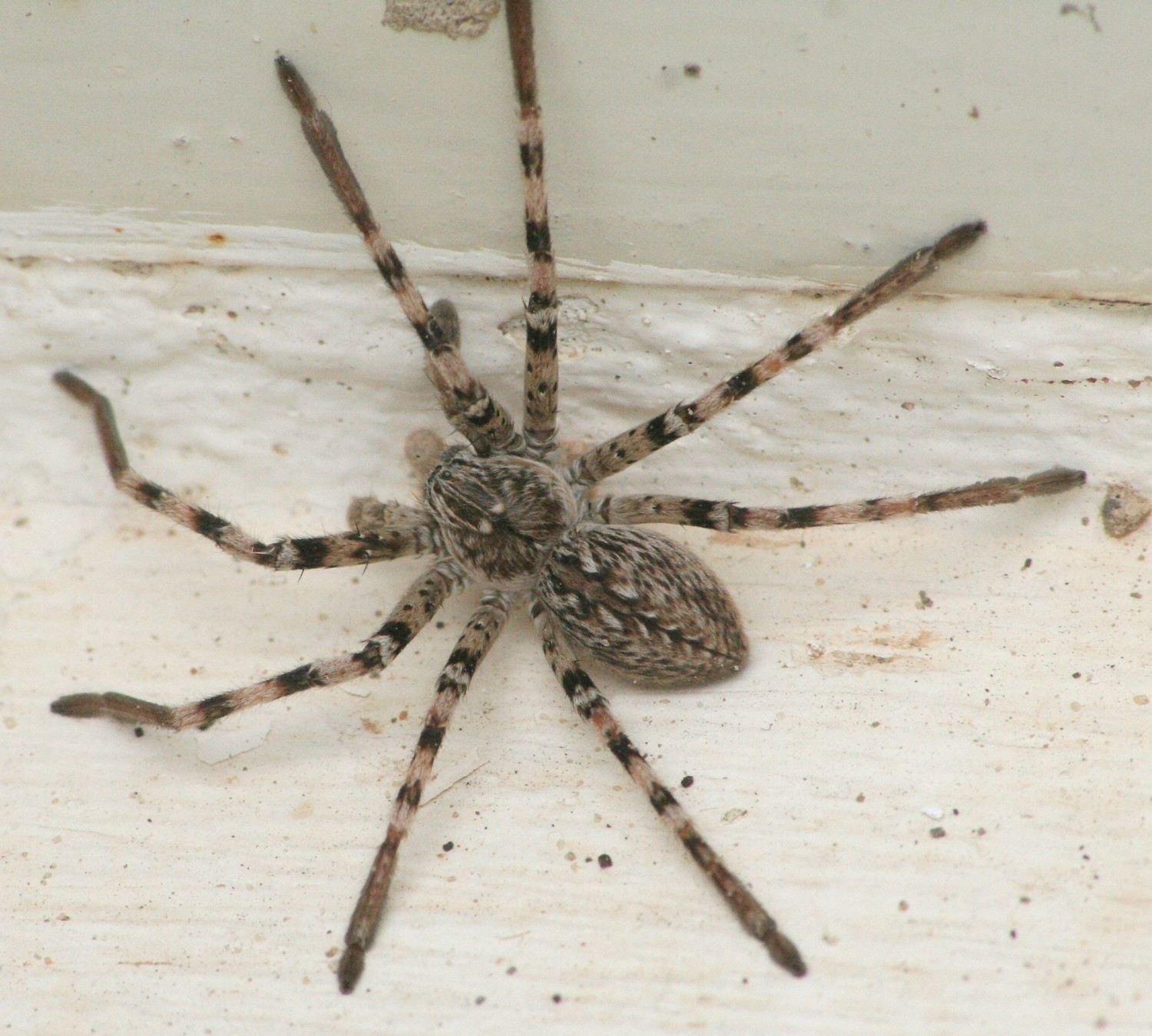
Eusparassus dufouri

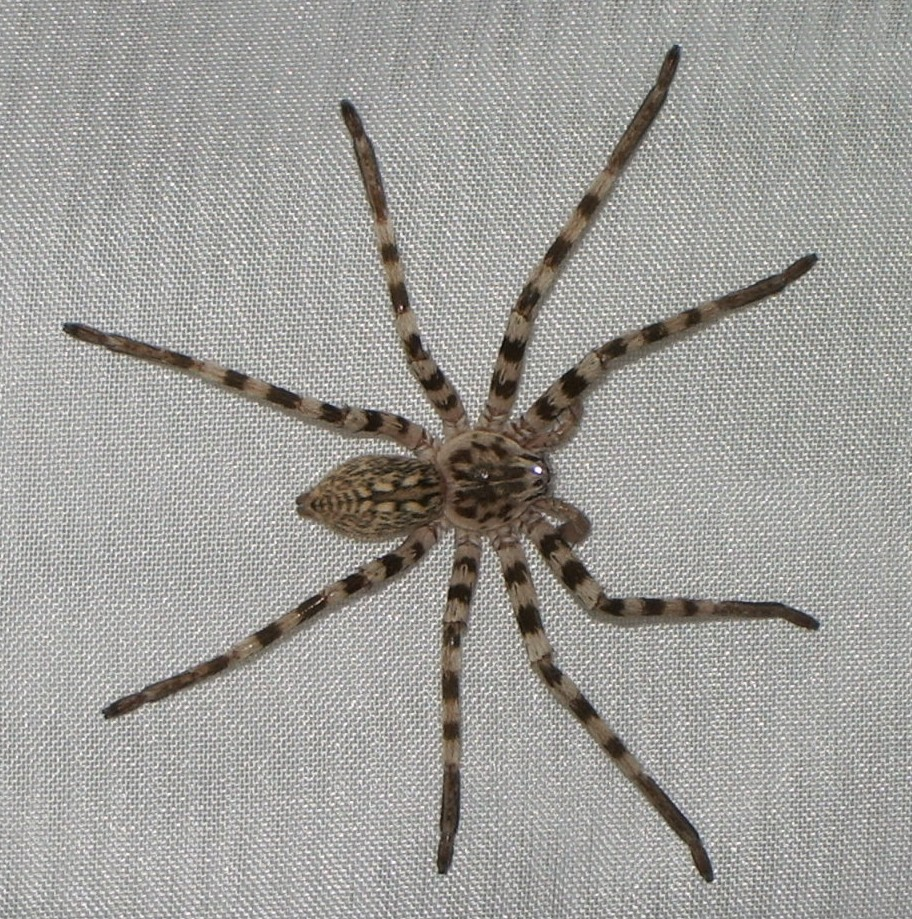
Eusparassus walckenaeri

Eusparassus Simon, 1903 - Incertae Sedis

- Eusparassus arabicus Moradmand, 2013 — Saudi Arabia, United Arab Emirates
- Eusparassus atlanticus Simon, 1909 — Morocco
- Eusparassus barbarus (Lucas, 1846) — Algeria, Tunisia
- Eusparassus bicorniger (Pocock, 1898) — Egypt, Ethiopia, East Africa
- Eusparassus borakalalo Moradmand, 2013 — South Africa
- † Eusparassus crassipes C. L. Koch & Berendt, 1854 — Palaeogen Baltic amber
- Eusparassus doriae (Simon, 1874) — Iran
- Eusparassus dufouri Simon, 1932 (type) — Portugal, Spain, Netherlands (introduced)
- Eusparassus educatus Moradmand, 2013 — Namibia
- Eusparassus fritschi (C. Koch, 1873) — Morocco
- Eusparassus fuscimanus Denis, 1958 — Afghanistan
- Eusparassus jaegeri Moradmand, 2013 — Botswana, South Africa
- Eusparassus jocquei Moradmand, 2013 — Zimbabwe
- Eusparassus kronebergi Denis, 1958 — Iran, Afghanistan, India
- Eusparassus laevatus (Simon, 1897) — Ethiopia, Djibouti, Somalia, Arabian Peninsula
- Eusparassus laterifuscus Strand, 1908 — Madagascar
- Eusparassus letourneuxi (Simon, 1874) — Algeria, Tunisia
- Eusparassus levantinus Urones, 2006 — Spain
- Eusparassus maynardi (Pocock, 1901) — Pakistan
- Eusparassus mesopotamicus Moradmand & Jäger, 2012 — Iraq, Iran
- Eusparassus oculatus (Kroneberg, 1875) — Iran, Central Asia to China
- Eusparassus oraniensis (Lucas, 1846) — North Africa
- Eusparassus pearsoni (Pocock, 1901) — India
- Eusparassus perezi (Simon, 1902) — Somalia, Djibouti, Arabian Peninsula
- Eusparassus pontii Caporiacco, 1935 — India, Pakistan
- Eusparassus potanini (Simon, 1895) — China
- Eusparassus reverentia Moradmand, 2013 — Burkina Faso, Nigeria
- Eusparassus schoemanae Moradmand, 2013 — Namibia, South Africa
- Eusparassus shefteli Chamberlin, 1916 — Peru
- Eusparassus syrticus Simon, 1909 — Tunisia
- Eusparassus tuckeri Lawrence, 1927 — Angola, Namibia
- Eusparassus vestigator (Simon, 1897) — East Africa
- Eusparassus walckenaeri (Audouin, 1826) — Sudan, Algeria to Iraq
- Eusparassus xerxes (Pocock, 1901) — United Arab Emirates, Iran, Pakistan

=== Exopalystes ===
Exopalystes Hogg, 1914 - Incertae Sedis

- Exopalystes pulchellus Hogg, 1914 (type) — New Guinea

=== Extraordinarius ===
Extraordinarius Rheims, 2019 - Sparianthinae

- Extraordinarius alicecooperi Rheims, 2022 – Brazil
- Extraordinarius andrematosi Rheims, 2019 (type) — Brazil
- Extraordinarius angusyoungi Rheims, 2022 – Brazil
- Extraordinarius brucedickinsoni Rheims, 2019 — Brazil
- Extraordinarius klausmeinei Rheims, 2019 — Brazil
- Extraordinarius rickalleni Rheims, 2019 — Brazil

== G ==
=== Geminia ===
Geminia Thorell, 1897 - Incertae Sedis

- Geminia sulphurea Thorell, 1897 (type) — Myanmar

=== Gnathopalystes ===
Gnathopalystes

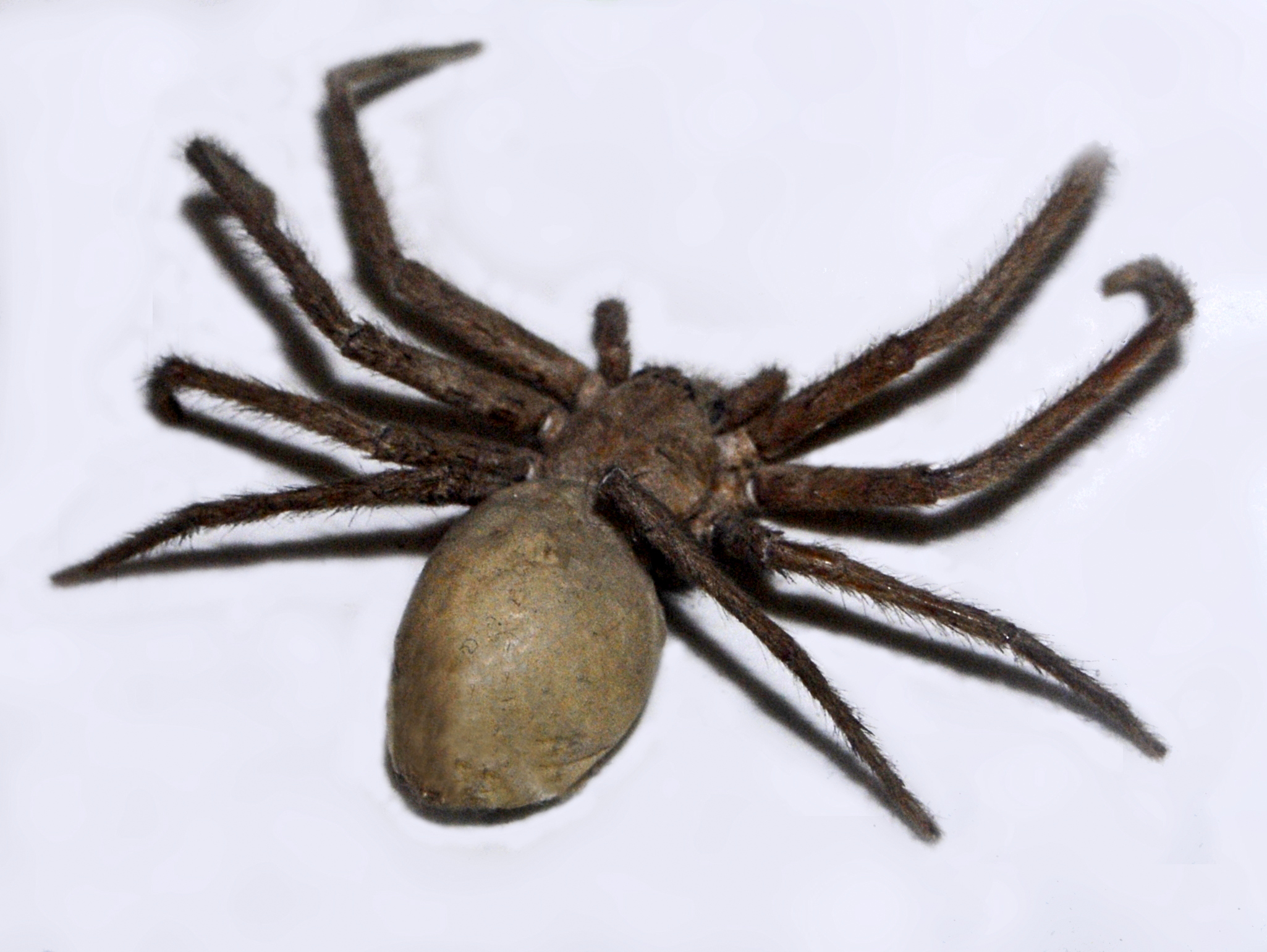
Gnathopalystes kochi

Gnathopalystes Rainbow, 1899 - Incertae Sedis

- Gnathopalystes aureolus (He & Hu, 2000) — China (Hainan)
- Gnathopalystes crucifer (Simon, 1880) — Malaysia or Indonesia (Java)
- Gnathopalystes denticulatus (Saha & Raychaudhuri, 2007) — India
- Gnathopalystes ferox Rainbow, 1899 (type) — Vanuatu
- Gnathopalystes ignicomus (L. Koch, 1875) — Papua New Guinea (New Ireland, New Britain)
- Gnathopalystes kochi (Simon, 1880) — India, Myanmar, Malaysia, Indonesia (Java, Sumatra, Borneo)
- Gnathopalystes nigriventer (Kulczyński, 1910) — New Guinea, Solomon Is.
- Gnathopalystes nigrocornutus (Merian, 1911) — Indonesia (Sulawesi)
- Gnathopalystes rutilans (Simon, 1899) — Indonesia (Sumatra)
- Gnathopalystes taiwanensis Zhu & Tso, 2006 — Taiwan

=== Guadana ===
Guadana Rheims, 2010 - Heteropodinae

- Guadana manauara Rheims, 2010 (type) — Brazil
- Guadana neblina Rheims, 2010 — Brazil
- Guadana panguana Rheims, 2010 — Peru
- Guadana quillu Rheims, 2010 — Ecuador
- Guadana tambopata Rheims, 2010 — Peru
- Guadana urucu Rheims, 2010 — Brazil

== H ==
=== Heteropoda ===
Heteropoda

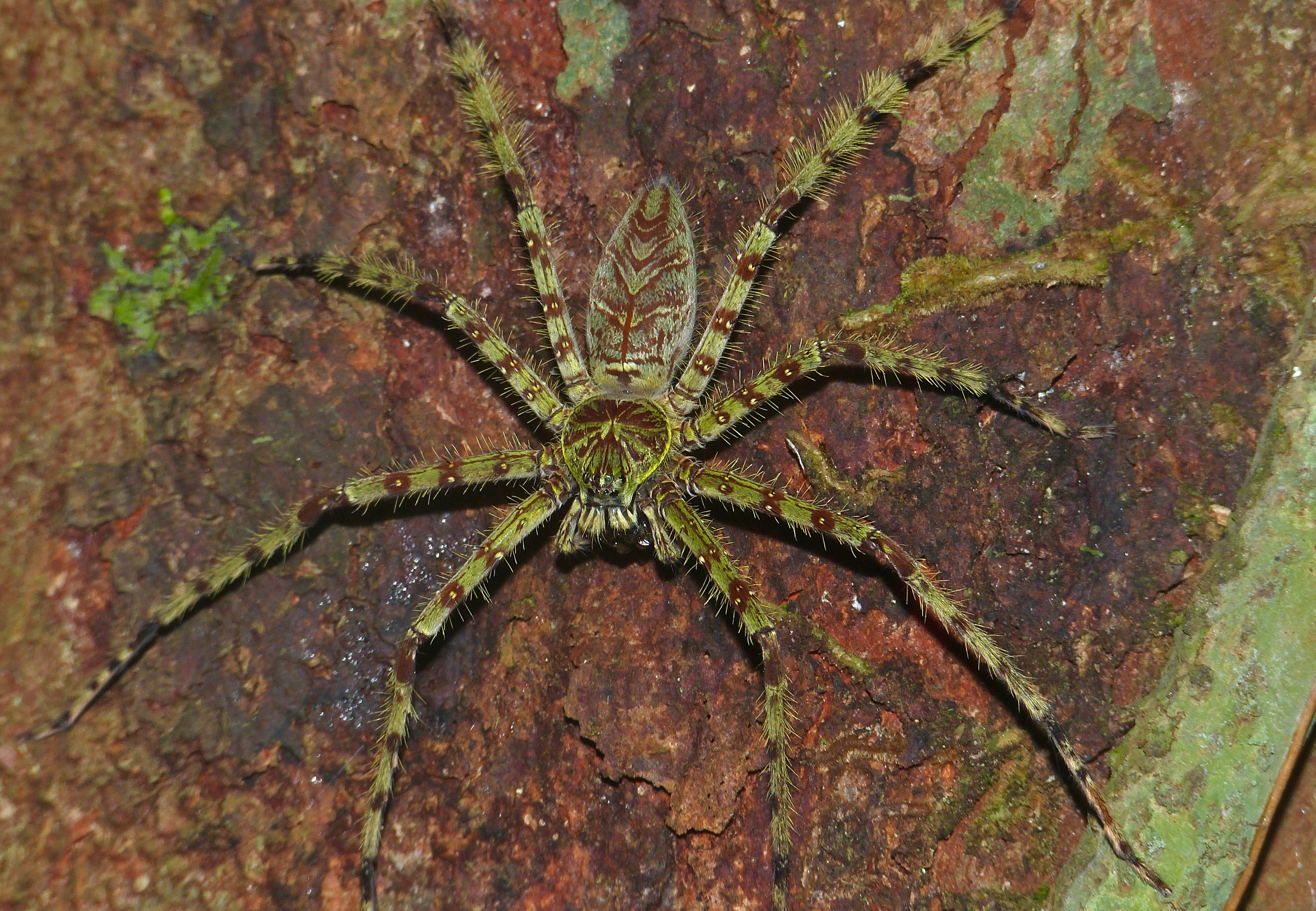
Heteropoda boiei

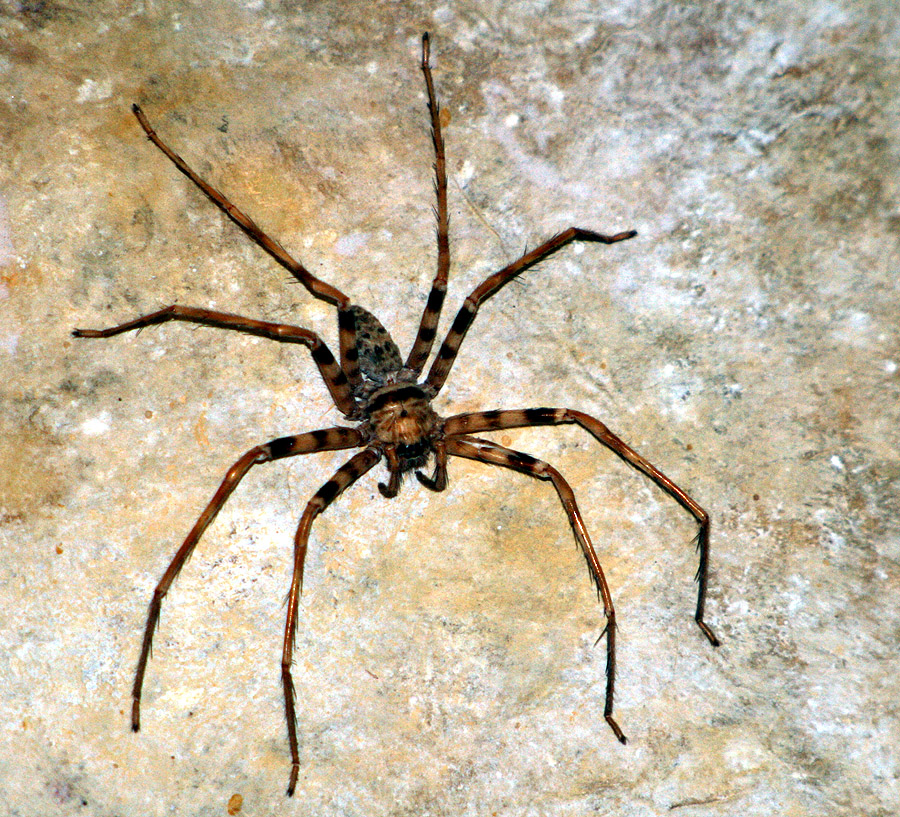
Giant huntsman spider
(Heteropoda maxima)

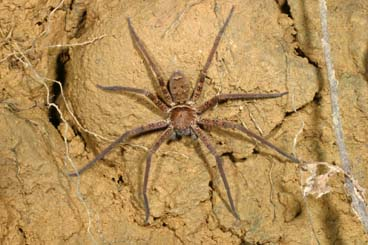
Heteropoda simplex, female

Heteropoda Latreille, 1804 - Heteropodinae

- Heteropoda acuta Davies, 1994 — Australia (Queensland)
- Heteropoda aemulans Bayer & Jäger, 2009 — Laos
- Heteropoda afghana Roewer, 1962 — Afghanistan, Pakistan, India
- Heteropoda alta Davies, 1994 — Australia (Queensland)
- Heteropoda altithorax Strand, 1907 — India
- Heteropoda altmannae Jäger, 2008 — Vietnam
- Heteropoda amphora Fox, 1936 — China, Hong Kong
- Heteropoda analis Thorell, 1881 — New Guinea, Indonesia (Aru Is.)
- Heteropoda armillata (Thorell, 1887) — Myanmar, Indonesia (Sumatra)
- Heteropoda atollicola Pocock, 1904 — Maldive Is.
- Heteropoda atriventris Chrysanthus, 1965 — New Guinea
- Heteropoda badiella Roewer, 1951 — Indonesia (Moluccas)
- Heteropoda bellendenker Davies, 1994 — Australia (Queensland)
- Heteropoda belua Jäger, 2005 — Borneo
- Heteropoda beroni Jäger, 2005 — Indonesia (Sulawesi)
- Heteropoda bhaikakai Patel & Patel, 1973 — India
- Heteropoda binnaburra Davies, 1994 — Australia (Queensland, New South Wales)
- Heteropoda boiei (Doleschall, 1859) — Malaysia, Indonesia (Sumatra, Java, Borneo)
- Heteropoda bonthainensis Merian, 1911 — Indonesia (Sulawesi)
- Heteropoda borneensis (Thorell, 1890) — Borneo
- Heteropoda boutani (Simon, 1906) — Vietnam
- Heteropoda bulburin Davies, 1994 — Australia (Queensland)
- Heteropoda camelia Strand, 1914 — Colombia
- Heteropoda cavernicola Davies, 1994 — Australia (Western Australia)
- Heteropoda cece Jäger, 2014 — Borneo
- Heteropoda cervina (L. Koch, 1875) — Australia (Queensland)
- Heteropoda chelata (Strand, 1911) — New Guinea
  - Heteropoda chelata vittichelis (Strand, 1911) — New Guinea
- Heteropoda chengbuensis Wang, 1990 — China
- Heteropoda christae Jäger, 2008 — Malaysia, Singapore, Indonesia (Sumatra)
- Heteropoda conwayensis Davies, 1994 — Australia (Queensland)
- Heteropoda cooki Davies, 1994 — Australia (Queensland)
- Heteropoda cooloola Davies, 1994 — Australia (Queensland)
- Heteropoda crassa Simon, 1880 — Indonesia (Java)
- Heteropoda crediton Davies, 1994 — Australia (Queensland)
- Heteropoda cyanichelis Strand, 1907 — Indonesia (Java)
- Heteropoda cyanognatha Thorell, 1881 — Papua New Guinea (Yule Is.)
- Heteropoda cyperusiria Barrion & Litsinger, 1995 — Philippines
- Heteropoda dagmarae Jäger & Vedel, 2005 — Laos, Thailand
- Heteropoda dasyurina (Hogg, 1914) — New Guinea
- Heteropoda davidbowie Jäger, 2008 — Malaysia, Singapore, Indonesia (Sumatra)
- Heteropoda debilis (L. Koch, 1875) — Samoa
- Heteropoda distincta Davies, 1994 — Australia (Queensland, New South Wales)
- Heteropoda duan Jäger, 2008 — Borneo
- Heteropoda duo Jäger, 2014 — Borneo
- Heteropoda elatana Strand, 1911 — Indonesia (Kei Is., Aru Is.)
- Heteropoda eluta Karsch, 1892 — Sri Lanka
- Heteropoda emarginativulva Strand, 1907 — India
- Heteropoda ernstulrichi Jäger, 2008 — Indonesia (Sumatra)
- Heteropoda erythra Chrysanthus, 1965 — New Guinea
- Heteropoda eungella Davies, 1994 — Australia (Queensland)
- Heteropoda fabrei Simon, 1885 — India
- Heteropoda fischeri Jäger, 2005 — India
- Heteropoda flavocephala Merian, 1911 — Indonesia (Sulawesi)
- Heteropoda furva Thorell, 1890 — Malaysia
- Heteropoda garciai Barrion & Litsinger, 1995 — Philippines
- Heteropoda gemella Simon, 1877 — Philippines
- Heteropoda goonaneman Davies, 1994 — Australia (Queensland)
- Heteropoda gordonensis Davies, 1994 — Australia (Queensland)
- Heteropoda gourae Monga, Sadana & Singh, 1988 — India
- Heteropoda graaflandi Strand, 1907 — Indonesia (Java)
- Heteropoda grooteeylandt Davies, 1994 — Australia (Northern Territory)
- Heteropoda gyirongensis Hu & Li, 1987 — China
- Heteropoda hampsoni Pocock, 1901 — India
- Heteropoda helge Jäger, 2008 — China
- Heteropoda hermitis (Hogg, 1914) — Australia (Western Australia)
- Heteropoda hildebrandti Jäger, 2008 — Indonesia (Moluccas)
- Heteropoda hillerae Davies, 1994 — Australia (Queensland)
- Heteropoda hippie Jäger, 2008 — Indonesia (Sumatra)
- Heteropoda hirsti Jäger, 2008 — New Guinea
- Heteropoda holoventris Davies, 1994 — Australia (Queensland)
- Heteropoda homstu Jäger, 2008 — Indonesia (Sumatra, Java, Borneo)
- Heteropoda hosei Pocock, 1897 — Borneo
- Heteropoda hupingensis Peng & Yin, 2001 — China
- Heteropoda ignichelis (Simon, 1880) — Vietnam
- Heteropoda imbecilla Thorell, 1892 — Malaysia, Indonesia (Sumatra)
- Heteropoda jacobii Strand, 1911 — New Guinea
- Heteropoda jaegerorum Jäger, 2008 — Singapore, Indonesia (Sumatra)
- Heteropoda jasminae Jäger, 2008 — Vietnam
- Heteropoda javana (Simon, 1880) — Malaysia, Indonesia (Java, Sumatra)
- Heteropoda jiangxiensis Li, 1991 — China
- Heteropoda jugulans (L. Koch, 1876) — Australia (Queensland)
- Heteropoda kabaenae Strand, 1911 — Indonesia (Sulawesi)
- Heteropoda kalbarri Davies, 1994 — Australia (Western Australia)
- Heteropoda kandiana Pocock, 1899 — India, Sri Lanka
- Heteropoda kuekenthali Pocock, 1897 — Indonesia (Moluccas)
- Heteropoda kuluensis Sethi & Tikader, 1988 — India
- Heteropoda kusi Jäger, 2014 — Borneo
- Heteropoda laai Jäger, 2008 — Singapore, Indonesia (Sumatra)
- Heteropoda languida Simon, 1887 — Myanmar
- Heteropoda lashbrooki (Hogg, 1922) — Vietnam
- Heteropoda lentula Pocock, 1901 — India
- Heteropoda leprosa Simon, 1884 — India, Myanmar, Malaysia
- Heteropoda leptoscelis Thorell, 1892 — Indonesia (Sumatra)
- Heteropoda lindbergi Roewer, 1962 — Afghanistan
- Heteropoda listeri Pocock, 1900 — Australia (Christmas Is.)
- Heteropoda loderstaedti Jäger, 2008 — Malaysia, Indonesia (Sumatra)
- Heteropoda longipes (L. Koch, 1875) — Australia (New South Wales)
- Heteropoda lunula (Doleschall, 1857) — India to Vietnam, Malaysia, Indonesia (Java, Sumatra, Borneo)
- Heteropoda luwuensis Merian, 1911 — Indonesia (Sulawesi)
- Heteropoda malitiosa Simon, 1906 — India
- Heteropoda marillana Davies, 1994 — Australia (Western Australia)
- Heteropoda martinae Jäger, 2008 — Indonesia (Sumatra)
- Heteropoda martusa Jäger, 2000 — Indonesia (Sumatra)
- Heteropoda maukin Jäger, 2014 — Borneo
- Heteropoda maxima Jäger, 2001 — Laos
- Heteropoda mecistopus Pocock, 1898 — Solomon Is.
- Heteropoda mediocris Simon, 1880 — New Guinea
- Heteropoda meriani Jäger, 2008 — Indonesia (Sulawesi)
- Heteropoda merkarensis Strand, 1907 — India
- Heteropoda meticulosa Simon, 1880 — Peru
- Heteropoda minahassae Merian, 1911 — Indonesia (Sulawesi)
- Heteropoda mindiptanensis Chrysanthus, 1965 — New Guinea
- Heteropoda modiglianii Thorell, 1890 — Indonesia (Java)
- Heteropoda monroei Davies, 1994 — Australia (Queensland)
- Heteropoda montana Thorell, 1890 — Indonesia (Sumatra)
- Heteropoda monteithi Davies, 1994 — Australia (Queensland)
- Heteropoda mossman Davies, 1994 — Australia (Queensland)
- Heteropoda murina (Pocock, 1897) — Borneo
- Heteropoda muscicapa Strand, 1911 — New Guinea
- Heteropoda nagarigoon Davies, 1994 — Australia (Queensland, New South Wales)
- Heteropoda natans Jäger, 2005 — Borneo
- Heteropoda nebulosa Thorell, 1890 — Malaysia
- Heteropoda nigriventer Pocock, 1897 — Indonesia (Sulawesi)
- Heteropoda nilgirina Pocock, 1901 — India
- Heteropoda ninahagen Jäger, 2008 — Malaysia
- Heteropoda nirounensis (Simon, 1903) — India, Indonesia (Sumatra)
- Heteropoda nobilis (L. Koch, 1875) — Vanuatu, Australia, Polynesia
- Heteropoda novaguineensis Strand, 1911 — New Guinea
- Heteropoda nyalama Hu & Li, 1987 — China
- Heteropoda obe Jäger, 2014 — Indonesia (Sulawesi)
- Heteropoda obtusa Thorell, 1890 — Borneo
- Heteropoda ocyalina (Simon, 1887) — Indonesia (Java, Sumatra)
- † Heteropoda Ocypete angustifrons Menge in C. L. Koch & Berendt, 1854 — Palaeogene Baltic amber
- † Heteropoda Ocypete marginata Menge in C. L. Koch & Berendt, 1854 — Palaeogene Baltic amber
- Heteropoda onoi Jäger, 2008 — China, Vietnam
- Heteropoda opo Jäger, 2014 — Myanmar
- Heteropoda pakawini Jäger, 2008 — Thailand
- Heteropoda parva Jäger, 2000 — Malaysia, Indonesia (Sumatra, Borneo)
- Heteropoda pedata Strand, 1907 — India
  - Heteropoda pedata magna Strand, 1909 — India
- Heteropoda pekkai Jäger, 2014 — Bhutan
- Heteropoda phasma Simon, 1897 — India
- Heteropoda pingtungensis Zhu & Tso, 2006 — China, Taiwan
- Heteropoda planiceps (Pocock, 1897) — Indonesia (Moluccas)
- Heteropoda plebeja Thorell, 1887 — Myanmar
- Heteropoda pressula Simon, 1886 — Vietnam
- Heteropoda procera (L. Koch, 1867) — Australia (Queensland, New South Wales)
- Heteropoda raveni Davies, 1994 — Australia (Queensland)
- Heteropoda reinholdae Jäger, 2008 — Indonesia (Sumatra)
- Heteropoda renibulbis Davies, 1994 — Australia (Western Australia, Northern Territory, Queensland)
- Heteropoda richlingi Jäger, 2008 — Indonesia (Sumatra, Java)
- Heteropoda robusta Fage, 1924 — India
- Heteropoda rosea Karsch, 1879 — Colombia
- † Heteropoda rpbusta Hong, 1985 — Neogene Shanwang
- Heteropoda rubra Chrysanthus, 1965 — New Guinea
- Heteropoda rufognatha Strand, 1907 — India
- Heteropoda rundle Davies, 1994 — Australia (Queensland)
- Heteropoda ruricola Thorell, 1881 — New Guinea
- Heteropoda sarotoides Järvi, 1914 — New Guinea
- Heteropoda sartrix (L. Koch, 1865) — Australia
- Heteropoda schlaginhaufeni Strand, 1911 — New Guinea
- Heteropoda schwalbachorum Jäger, 2008 — China
- Heteropoda schwendingeri Jäger, 2005 — Thailand
- Heteropoda sexpunctata Simon, 1885 — India, Malaysia
- Heteropoda signata Thorell, 1890 — Indonesia (Sumatra)
- Heteropoda silvatica Davies, 1994 — Australia (Queensland)
- Heteropoda simoneallmannae Jäger, 2018 — Philippines (Palawan)
- Heteropoda simplex Jäger & Ono, 2000 — Laos, Taiwan, Japan (Ryukyu Is.)
- Heteropoda speciosus (Pocock, 1898) — Solomon Is.
- Heteropoda spenceri Davies, 1994 — Australia (Northern Territory)
- Heteropoda spinipes (Pocock, 1897) — Indonesia (Moluccas)
- Heteropoda spurgeon Davies, 1994 — Australia (Queensland)
- Heteropoda squamacea Wang, 1990 — China
- Heteropoda steineri Bayer & Jäger, 2009 — Laos
- Heteropoda strandi Jäger, 2002 — Indonesia (Sumatra)
- Heteropoda strasseni Strand, 1915 — Indonesia (Java)
- Heteropoda striata Merian, 1911 — Indonesia (Sulawesi)
- Heteropoda striatipes (Leardi, 1902) — India
- Heteropoda submaculata Thorell, 1881 — New Guinea
  - Heteropoda submaculata torricelliana Strand, 1911 — New Guinea
- Heteropoda subplebeia Strand, 1907 — India
- Heteropoda subtilis Karsch, 1892 — Sri Lanka
- Heteropoda sumatrana Thorell, 1890 — Indonesia (Java, Sumatra)
  - Heteropoda sumatrana javacola Strand, 1907 — Indonesia (Java)
- Heteropoda teranganica Strand, 1911 — Indonesia (Aru Is.)
- Heteropoda tetrica Thorell, 1897 — China to Indonesia (Sumatra)
- Heteropoda udolindenberg Jäger, 2008 — Indonesia (Sumatra)
- Heteropoda uexkuelli Jäger, 2008 — Bali
- Heteropoda umbrata Karsch, 1892 — Sri Lanka
- Heteropoda variegata (Simon, 1874) — Greece to Israel
- Heteropoda veiliana Strand, 1907 — India
- Heteropoda venatoria (Linnaeus, 1767) (type) — Tropical Asia. Introduced to Pacific Is., North, Central and South America, Macaronesia, Europe, Africa
  - Heteropoda venatoria emarginata Thorell, 1881 — Indonesia (Western New Guinea)
  - Heteropoda venatoria foveolata Thorell, 1881 — New Guinea, Papua New Guinea (Yule Is.)
  - Heteropoda venatoria pseudoemarginata Strand, 1909 — Indonesia (Java)
- Heteropoda vespersa Davies, 1994 — Australia (Queensland)
- Heteropoda warrumbungle Davies, 1994 — Australia (New South Wales)
- Heteropoda warthiana Strand, 1907 — India
- Heteropoda willunga Davies, 1994 — Australia (Queensland)
- Heteropoda zuviele Jäger, 2008 — Vietnam, Taiwan

=== Holconia ===
Holconia

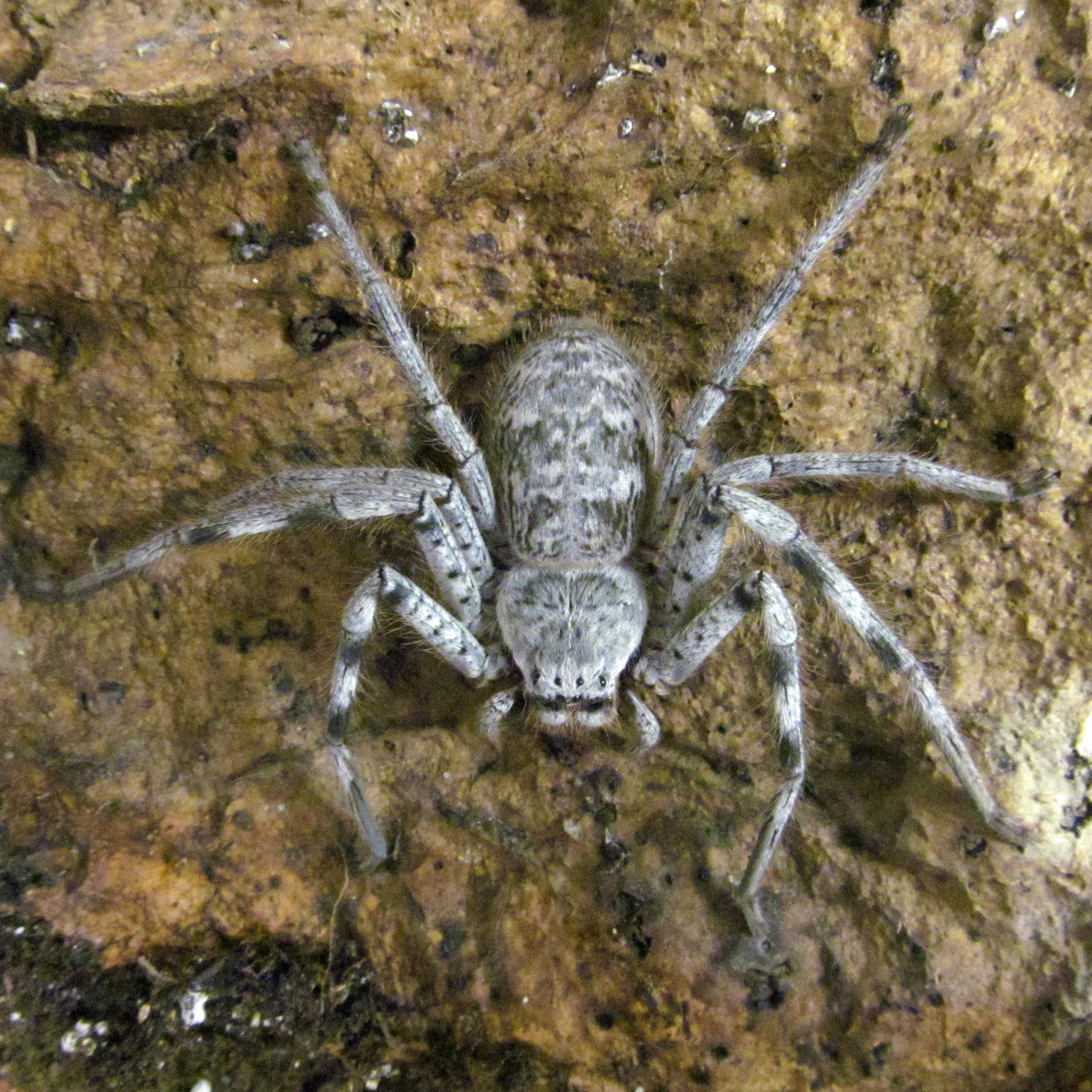
Holconia hirsuta

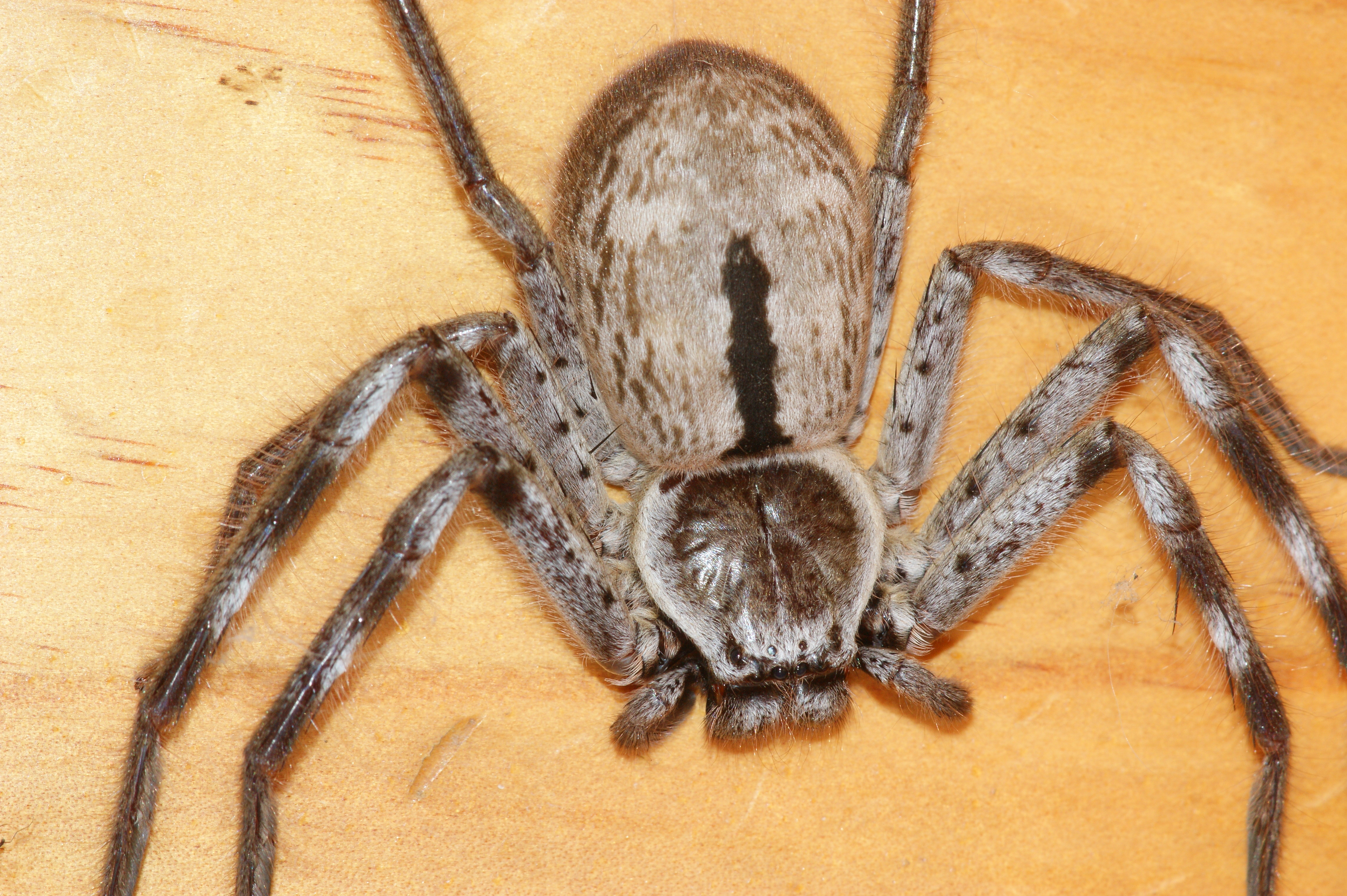
Sydney huntsman spider
(Holconia immanis)

Holconia Thorell, 1877 - Deleninae

- Holconia colberti Hirst, 1991 — Australia (Victoria)
- Holconia flindersi Hirst, 1991 — Australia (South Australia, Victoria, New South Wales)
- Holconia hirsuta (L. Koch, 1875) — Australia (Queensland)
- Holconia immanis (L. Koch, 1867) — Australia
- Holconia insignis (Thorell, 1870) (type) — Australia (Queensland, New South Wales)
- Holconia murrayensis Hirst, 1991 — Australia (South Australia, Victoria, New South Wales)
- Holconia neglecta Hirst, 1991 — Australia (Western Australia, Northern Territory)
- Holconia nigrigularis (Simon, 1908) — Australia
- Holconia westralia Hirst, 1991 — Australia
- neosholiconia wertanisis Hirst, 1941 — Australia
- neosholiconia Garisla Hirst, 1991 — Australia C - N Flattend wall Huntsman spider

== I ==
=== Irileka ===
Irileka Hirst, 1998 - Incertae Sedis

- Irileka iridescens Hirst, 1998 (type) — Australia (Western Australia)

=== Isopeda ===
Isopeda

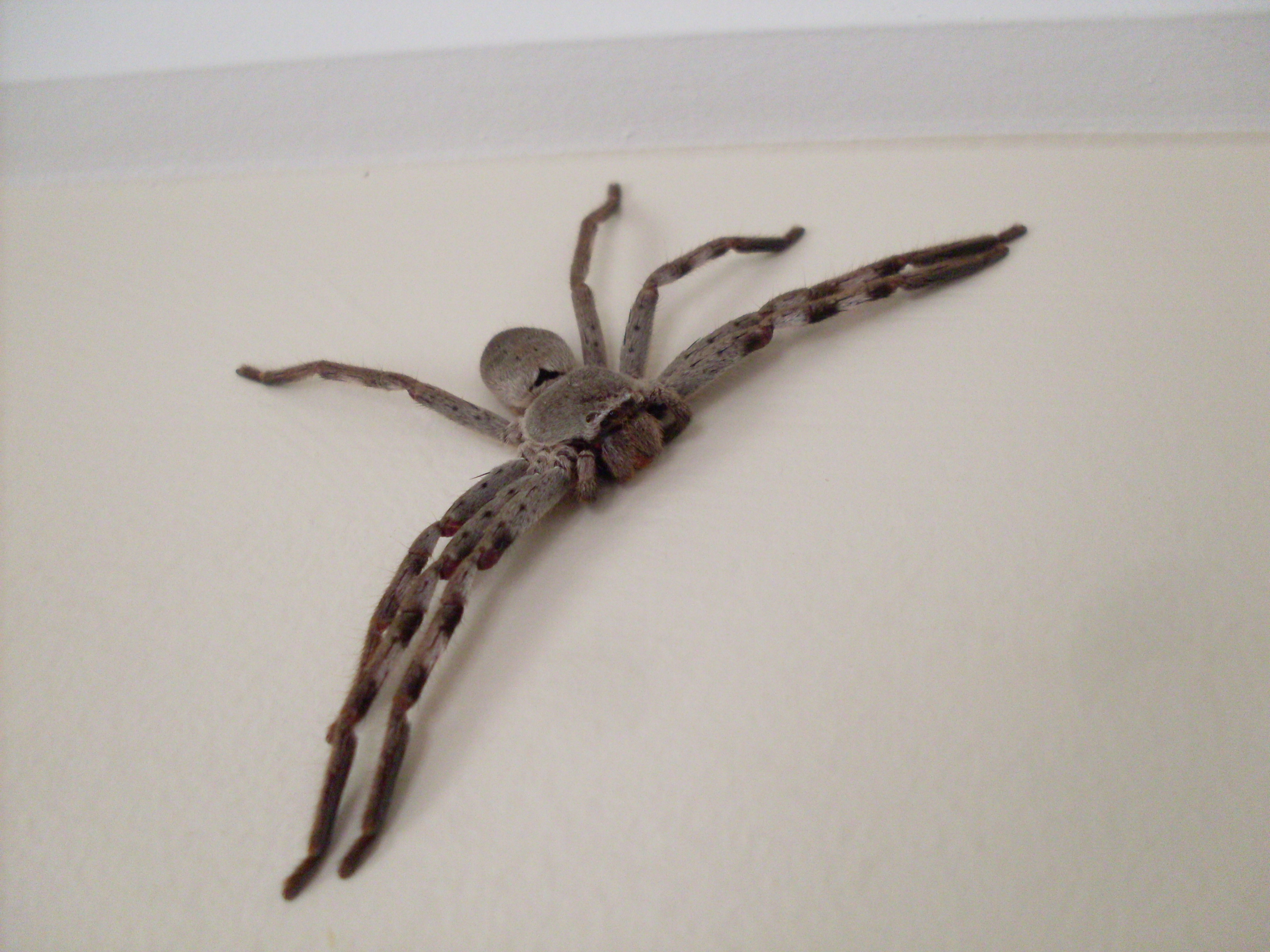
Isopeda vasta

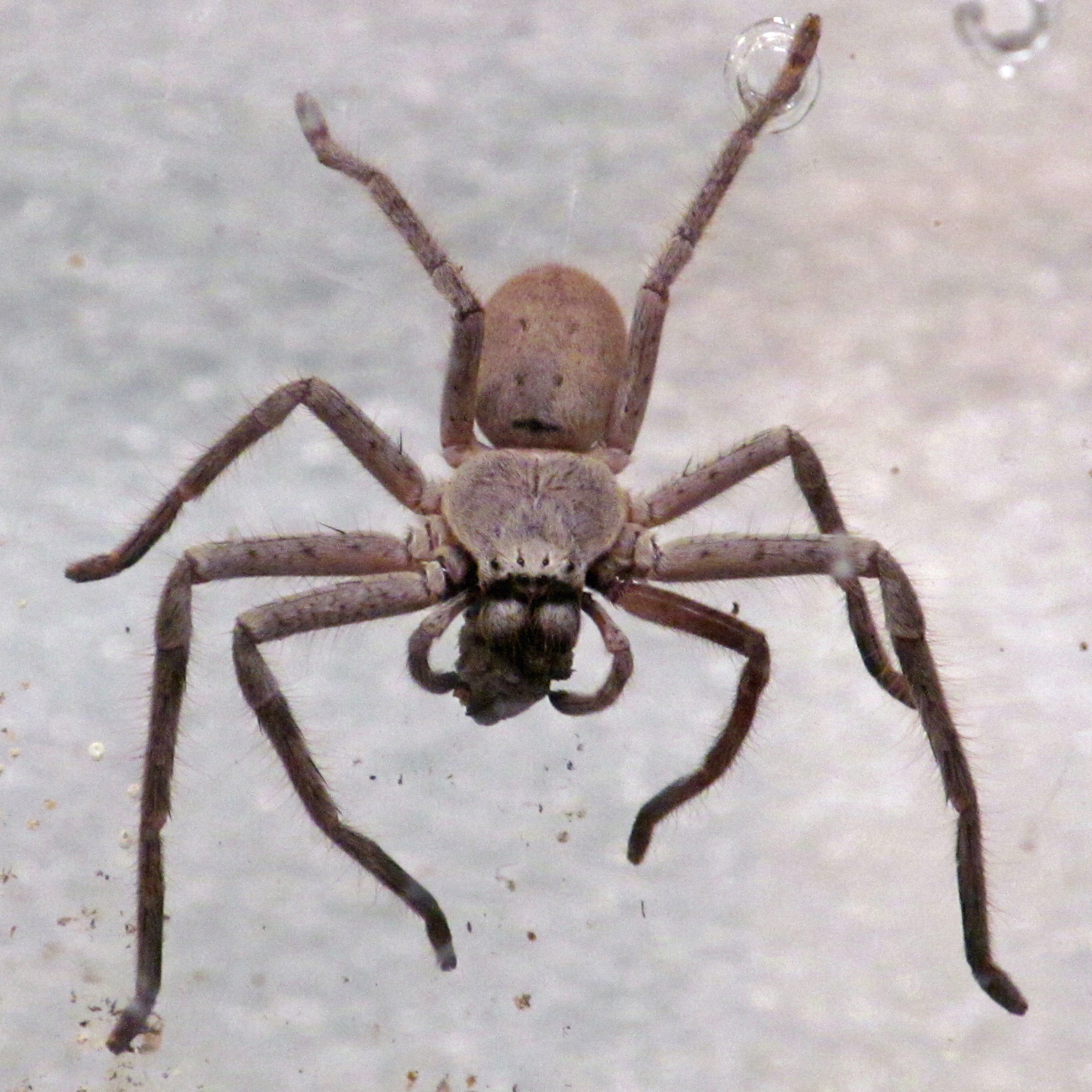
Isopeda villosa

Isopeda L. Koch, 1875 - Deleninae

- Isopeda alpina Hirst, 1992 — Australia (New South Wales, Victoria)
- Isopeda binnaburra Hirst, 1992 — Australia (Queensland)
- Isopeda brachyseta Hirst, 1992 — Australia (New South Wales)
- Isopeda canberrana Hirst, 1992 — Australia (New South Wales, Victoria)
- Isopeda catmona Barrion & Litsinger, 1995 — Philippines
- Isopeda deianira (Thorell, 1881) — New Guinea
- Isopeda echuca Hirst, 1992 — Australia (New South Wales, Victoria)
- Isopeda girraween Hirst, 1992 — Australia (Queensland)
- Isopeda igraya Barrion & Litsinger, 1995 — Philippines
- Isopeda leishmanni Hogg, 1903 — Australia (Western Australia, South Australia, Victoria)
  - Isopeda leishmanni hoggi Simon, 1908 — Australia (Western Australia)
- Isopeda magna Hirst, 1992 — Australia (Western Australia, South Australia)
- Isopeda montana Hogg, 1903 — Australia (South Australia, Victoria)
- Isopeda neocaledonica Berland, 1924 — New Caledonia
- Isopeda parnabyi Hirst, 1992 — Australia (Queensland, New South Wales)
- Isopeda prolata Hirst, 1992 — Australia (New South Wales, Victoria)
- Isopeda queenslandensis Hirst, 1992 — Australia (Queensland, New South Wales)
- Isopeda subalpina Hirst, 1992 — Australia (Victoria)
- Isopeda sungaya Barrion & Litsinger, 1995 — Philippines
- Isopeda vasta (L. Koch, 1867) (type) — Australia (Queensland)
- Isopeda villosa L. Koch, 1875 — Australia (New South Wales)
- Isopeda woodwardi Hogg, 1903 — Australia (South Australia)

=== Isopedella ===
Isopedella Hirst, 1990 - Deleninae

- Isopedella ambathala Hirst, 1993 — Australia (Queensland, South Australia)
- Isopedella cana (Simon, 1908) — Australia (Western Australia, South Australia)
- Isopedella castanea Hirst, 1993 — Australia (Western Australia)
- Isopedella cerina Hirst, 1993 — Australia (Queensland)
- Isopedella cerussata (Simon, 1908) — Australia
- Isopedella conspersa (L. Koch, 1875) — Australia (Queensland, Northern Territory)
- Isopedella flavida (L. Koch, 1875) — Australia (Queensland, New South Wales)
- Isopedella frenchi (Hogg, 1903) — Australia (Victoria, South Australia)
- Isopedella gibsandi Hirst, 1993 — Australia (Western Australia)
- Isopedella inola (Strand, 1913) — Australia
  - Isopedella inola carinatula (Strand, 1913) — Central Australia
- Isopedella leai (Hogg, 1903) — Australia (South Australia)
- Isopedella maculosa Hirst, 1993 — Australia (Western Australia)
- Isopedella meraukensis (Chrysanthus, 1965) — New Guinea, Australia (Queensland, Northern Territory)
- Isopedella pessleri (Thorell, 1870) (type) — Australia (New South Wales, Victoria)
- Isopedella saundersi (Hogg, 1903) — Australia
- Isopedella terangana (Strand, 1911) — Indonesia (Aru Is.)
- Isopedella tindalei Hirst, 1993 — Australia
- Isopedella victorialis Hirst, 1993 — Australia (Victoria)

== K ==
=== Keilira ===
Keilira Hirst, 1989 - Incertae Sedis

- Keilira sokoli Hirst, 1989 — Australia (Victoria)
- Keilira sparsomaculata Hirst, 1989 (type) — Australia (South Australia)

== L ==
=== Leucorchestris ===
Leucorchestris

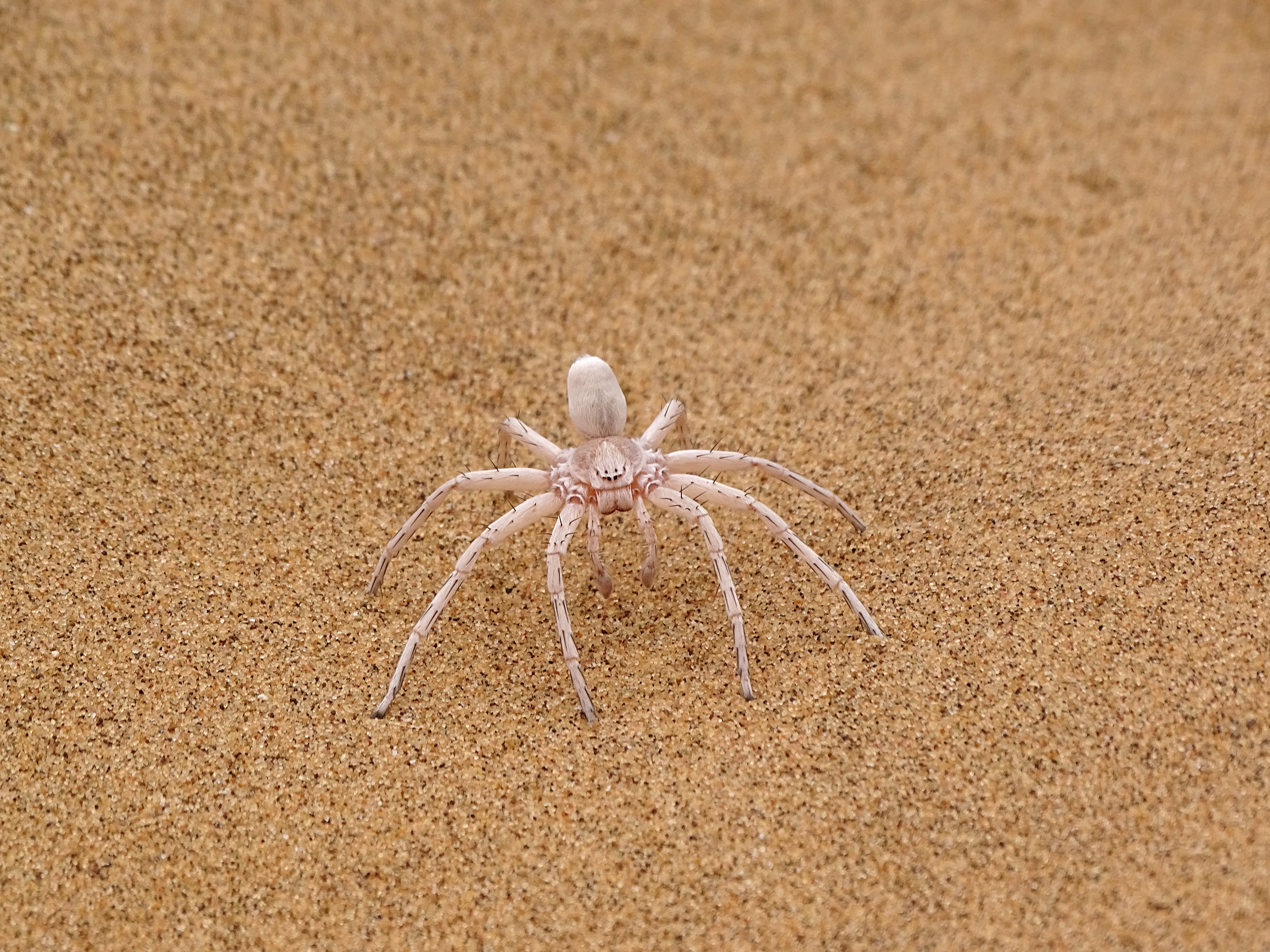
Leucorchestris arenicola

Leucorchestris Lawrence, 1962 - Incertae Sedis

- Leucorchestris alexandrina Lawrence, 1966 — Angola
- Leucorchestris arenicola Lawrence, 1962 (type) — Namibia
- Leucorchestris flavimarginata Lawrence, 1966 — Namibia
- Leucorchestris porti Lawrence, 1965 — Namibia
- Leucorchestris sabulosa Lawrence, 1966 — Namibia
- Leucorchestris setifrons Lawrence, 1966 — Angola
- Leucorchestris steyni Lawrence, 1965 — Namibia

== M ==
Marocanthosparassus

Macrocanthosparassus

Macrocanthosparassus Calyphosus

Macrocanthosparassus colomdianos

Macrocanthosparassus fernardi

Minoparassius

Minoparassius

Minoparassius gigas

Minoparassius teniilatus Simon, 2024 (type) — India

Minoparassius fenodidus Simon, 2024 (type) — India

Maropedella

Maropedella Simon, 2024 (type) — India

Maropedella nedomidius Simon, 2024 (type) — Australia

Maropedella netoparlus Simon, 2024 (type) — Australia

Macrogensisparassius (Macrogensisparassiinae) (Eugene louis simon) — Africa

Macrogensisparassius (Fox, 2020) — Brazil

Macrogensisparassius nodata Rheims, 2010 — Colombia

=== Macrinus ===
Macrinus Simon, 1887 - Sparassinae

- Macrinus bambuco Rheims, 2010 — Colombia
- Macrinus calypso Rheims, 2010 — Tobago
- Macrinus jaegeri Rheims, 2007 — Brazil
- Macrinus mohavensis (Fox, 1937) — USA
- Macrinus pollexensis (Schenkel, 1953) — Venezuela, Brazil
- Macrinus succineus Simon, 1887 (type) — Ecuador to Brazil

=== Martensikara ===
Martensikara

- Martensikara jocheni Jäger, 2021
- Martensikara junela Jäger, 2019
- Martensikara Giganteus Jäger, 1993
- Martensikara mareino

=== Martensopoda ===
Martensopoda Jäger, 2006 - Incertae Sedis

- Martensopoda minuscula (Reimoser, 1934) — India
- Martensopoda sanctor Sankaran, Malamel, Joseph & Sebastian, 2015 — India
- Martensopoda transversa Jäger, 2006 (type) — India

=== May ===
May Jäger & Krehenwinkel, 2015 - Incertae Sedis

- May ansie Jäger & Krehenwinkel, 2015 — Namibia
- May bruno Jäger & Krehenwinkel, 2015 (type) — South Africa
- May norm Jäger & Krehenwinkel, 2015 — Namibia
- May rudy Jäger & Krehenwinkel, 2015 — Namibia

=== Megaloremmius ===
Megaloremmius Simon, 1903 - Incertae Sedis

- Megaloremmius leo Simon, 1903 (type) — Madagascar

=== Micrommata ===
Micrommata

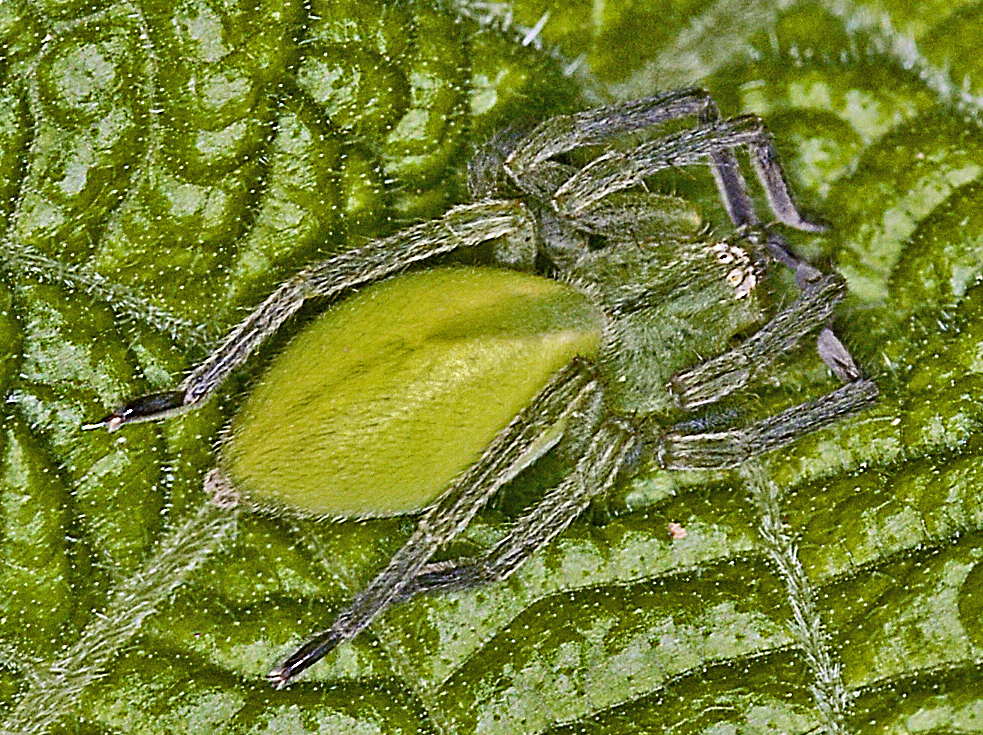
Micrommata ligurina

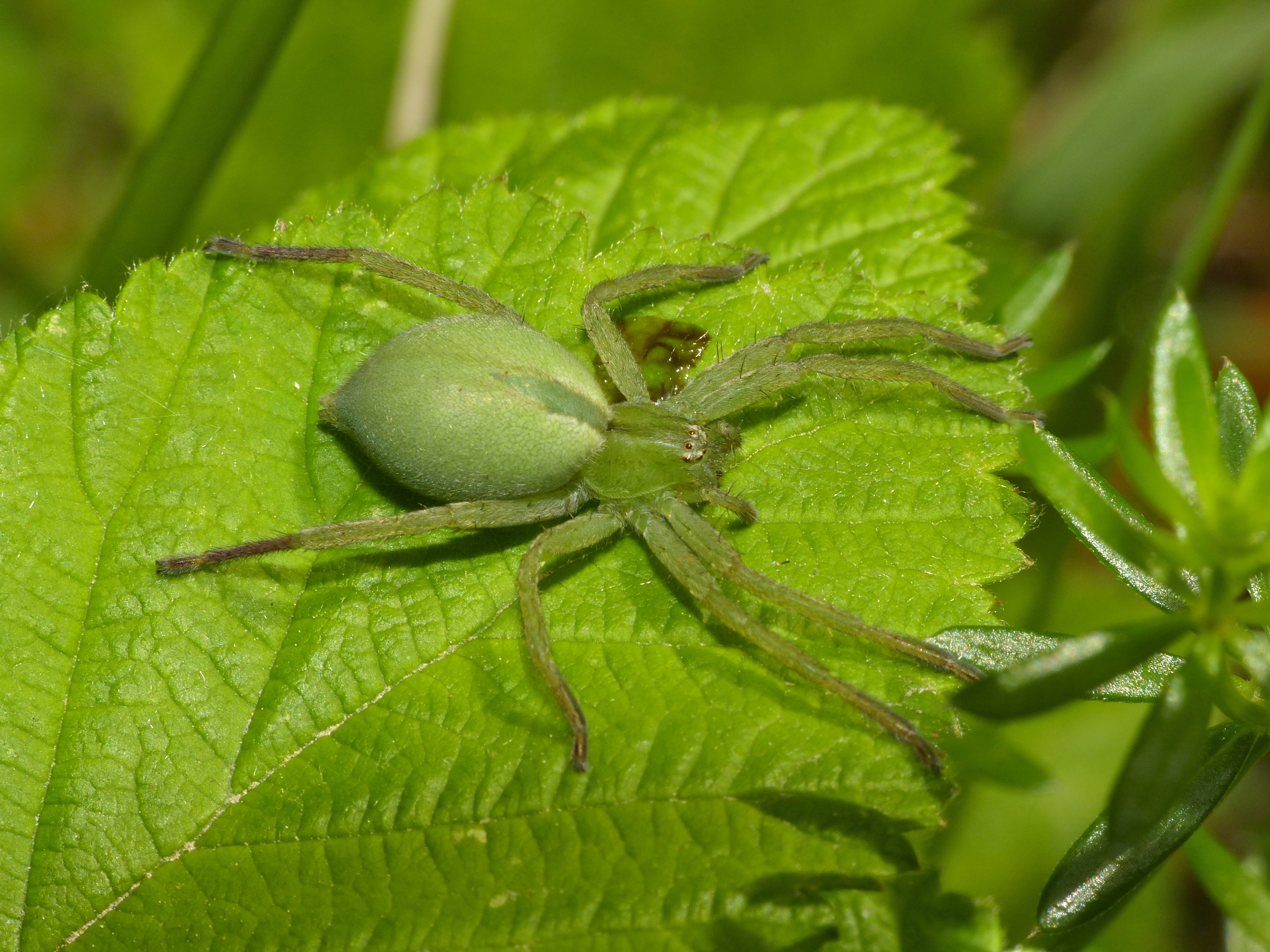
Green huntsman spider
(Micrommata virescens), female

Micrommata Latreille, 1804 - Sparassinae

- Micrommata aljibica Urones, 2004 – Spain
- Micrommata biggi Jäger, 2023 – Turkey, Armenia, Iraq, Iran, Turkmenistan
- Micrommata darlingi Pocock, 1901 – Zimbabwe
- Micrommata diesenhoff Jäger, 2023 – Sierra Leone
- Micrommata formosa Pavesi, 1878 – Mediterranean to Central Asia
- Micrommata ligurina (C. L. Koch, 1845) – Mediterranean to Central Asia
- Micrommata virescens (Clerck, 1757) (type) – Europe, Turkey, Caucasus, Russia (Europe Central Asia, to Far East (e.g. Korea, Japan) (including former Micrommata v. ornata (Walckenaer, 1802)).

(For Micrommata aragonensis Urones, 2004 see under Micrommata formosa).

=== Microrchestris ===
Microrchestris Lawrence, 1962 - Incertae Sedis

- Microrchestris melanogaster Lawrence, 1962 (type) — Namibia
- Microrchestris scutatus Lawrence, 1966 — Namibia

== N ==
=== Neosparassus ===
Neosparassus

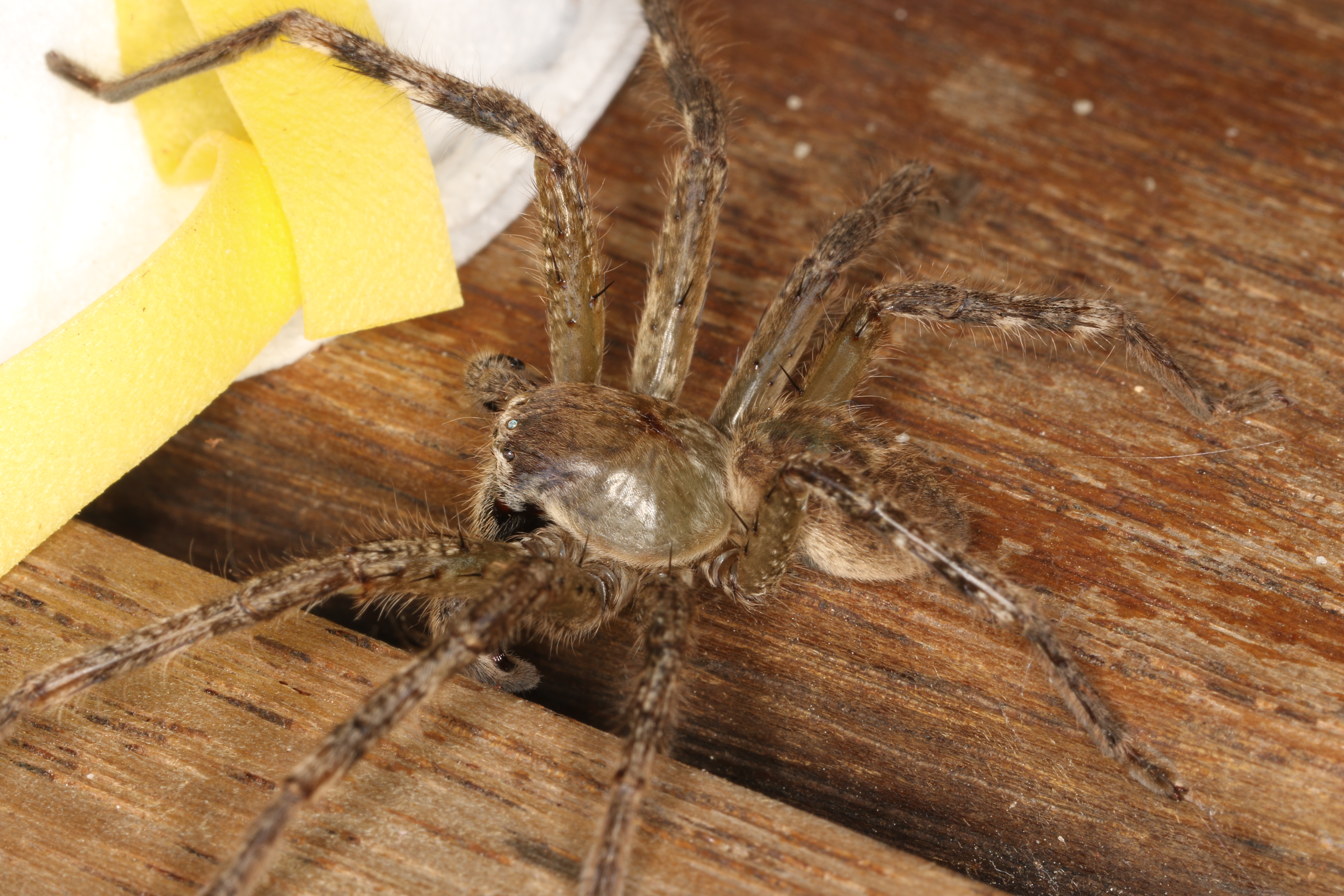
Neosparassus sp.

Neosparassus Hogg, 1903 - Deleninae

- Neosparassus calligaster (Thorell, 1870) — Australia
- Neosparassus conspicuus (L. Koch, 1875) — Australia (Queensland)
- Neosparassus diana (L. Koch, 1875) (type) — Australia (Western Australia, Victoria, Tasmania)
- Neosparassus festivus (L. Koch, 1875) — Australia (New South Wales)
- Neosparassus grapsus (Walckenaer, 1837) — Australia
- Neosparassus haemorrhoidalis (L. Koch, 1875) — Australia (New South Wales)
- Neosparassus incomtus (L. Koch, 1875) — Australia (New South Wales)
- Neosparassus inframaculatus (Hogg, 1896) — Central Australia
- Neosparassus macilentus (L. Koch, 1875) — Australia (Queensland, Victoria)
- Neosparassus magareyi Hogg, 1903 — Australia
- Neosparassus nitellinus (L. Koch, 1875) — Australia (Queensland)
- Neosparassus pallidus (L. Koch, 1875) — Australia (Queensland)
- Neosparassus patellatus (Karsch, 1878) — Australia (Tasmania)
- Neosparassus pictus (L. Koch, 1875) — Australia (Queensland)
- Neosparassus praeclarus (L. Koch, 1875) — Australia (Queensland)
- Neosparassus punctatus (L. Koch, 1865) — Australia
- Neosparassus rutilus (L. Koch, 1875) — Australia (Queensland)
- Neosparassus salacius (L. Koch, 1875) — Australia (Queensland, New South Wales)
- Neosparassus thoracicus Hogg, 1903 — Northern Australia

=== Neostasina ===
Neostasina Rheims & Alayón, 2016 - Sparianthinae

- Neostasina amalie Rheims & Alayón, 2016 — Virgin Is.
- Neostasina antiguensis (Bryant, 1923) — Antigua and Barbuda (Antigua)
- Neostasina baoruco Rheims & Alayón, 2016 — Dominican Rep.
- Neostasina bermudezi Rheims & Alayón, 2016 — Dominican Rep.
- Neostasina bicolor (Banks, 1914) — Jamaica, Haiti, Dominican Rep., Puerto Rico
- Neostasina bryantae Rheims & Alayón, 2016 — Cuba
- Neostasina cachote Rheims & Alayón, 2016 — Dominican Rep.
- Neostasina croix Rheims & Alayón, 2016 — Virgin Is.
- Neostasina elverde Rheims & Alayón, 2016 — Puerto Rico
- Neostasina granpiedra Rheims & Alayón, 2016 — Cuba
- Neostasina guanaboa Rheims & Alayón, 2016 — Jamaica
- Neostasina gunboat Rheims & Alayón, 2016 — Jamaica
- Neostasina iberia Rheims & Alayón, 2016 — Cuba
- Neostasina jamaicana Rheims & Alayón, 2016 — Jamaica
- Neostasina liguanea Rheims & Alayón, 2016 — Jamaica
- Neostasina lucasi (Bryant, 1940) — Cuba
- Neostasina lucea Rheims & Alayón, 2016 — Jamaica
- Neostasina macleayi (Bryant, 1940) (type) — Cuba
- Neostasina mammee Rheims & Alayón, 2016 — Jamaica
- Neostasina maroon Rheims & Alayón, 2016 — Jamaica
- Neostasina montegordo Rheims & Alayón, 2016 — Cuba
- Neostasina oualie Rheims & Alayón, 2016 — St. Kitts and Nevis (Nevis)
- Neostasina saetosa (Bryant, 1948) — Dominican Rep., Puerto Rico, Virgin Is.
- Neostasina siempreverde Rheims & Alayón, 2016 — Cuba
- Neostasina taino Rheims & Alayón, 2016 — Dominican Rep., Puerto Rico
- Neostasina turquino Rheims & Alayón, 2016 — Cuba
- Neostasina virginensis Rheims & Alayón, 2016 — Virgin Is.

=== Nisueta ===
Nisueta Simon, 1880 - Sparassinae

- Nisueta affinis Strand, 1906 — Sudan
- Nisueta flavescens Caporiacco, 1941 — Ethiopia
- Nisueta kolosvaryi Caporiacco, 1947 — Ethiopia
- Nisueta quadrispilota Simon, 1880 (type) — Tanzania (Zanzibar)
- Nisueta similis Berland, 1922 — Ethiopia

=== Nolavia ===
Nolavia Kammerer, 2006 - Sparassinae

- Nolavia rubriventris (Piza, 1939) (type) — Brazil

=== Nonianus ===
Nonianus Simon, 1885 - Sparassinae

- Nonianus gaujoni Simon, 1897 — Ecuador
- Nonianus pictus Simon, 1885 (type) — Algeria to Israel
- Nonianus unilateralis Strand, 1908 — Peru

=== Nungara ===
Nungara Pinto & Rheims, 2016 - Incertae Sedis

- Nungara anama Pinto & Rheims, 2016 — Brazil
- Nungara gaturama Pinto & Rheims, 2016 — Brazil
- Nungara niveomaculata (Mello-Leitão, 1941) (type) — Ecuador, Brazil

== O ==
=== Olios ===
Olios

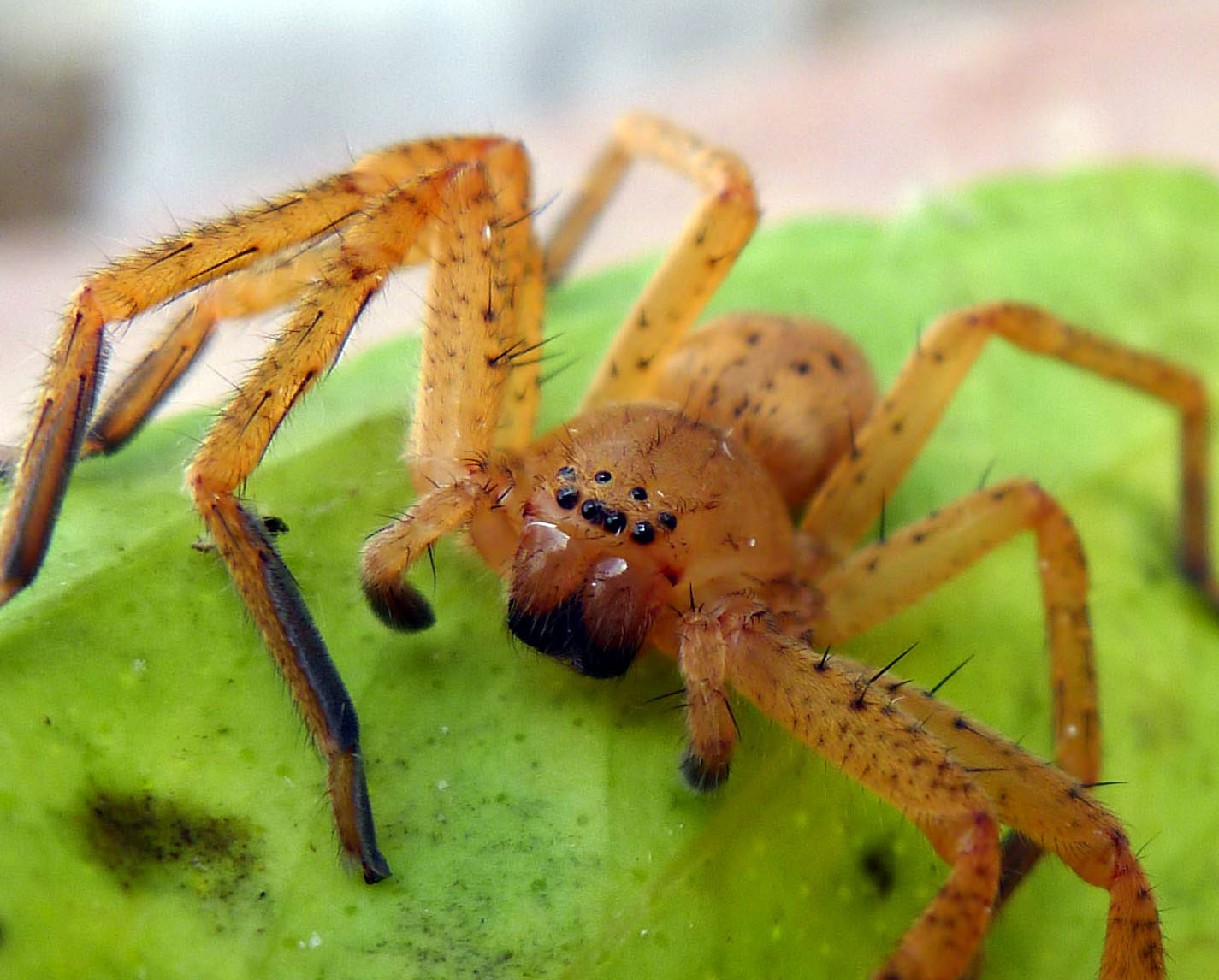
Olios argelasius

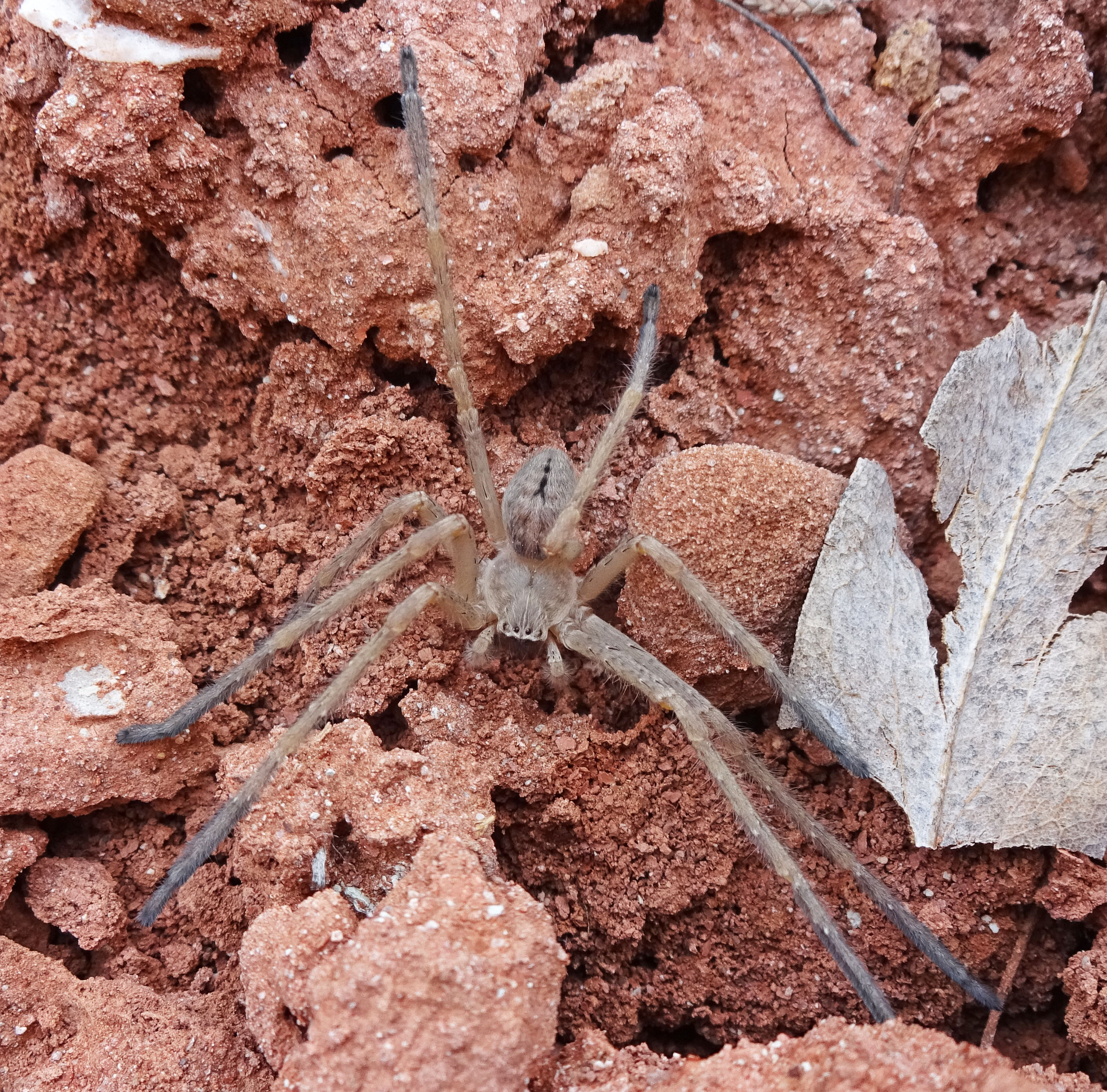
Olios giganteus

Olios Walckenaer, 1837 - Sparassinae

- Olios abnormis (Blackwall, 1866) — Central Africa
- Olios acolastus (Thorell, 1890) — Indonesia (Sumatra)
- Olios acostae Schenkel, 1953 — Venezuela
- Olios actaeon (Pocock, 1899) — Papua New Guinea (New Britain)
- Olios admiratus (Pocock, 1901) — India
- Olios africanus (Karsch, 1878) — Mozambique
- Olios albertius Strand, 1913 — Central Africa
- Olios alluaudi Simon, 1887 — Ivory Coast
- Olios amanensis Strand, 1907 — East Africa
- Olios annandalei (Simon, 1901) — Malaysia
- Olios antiguensis (Keyserling, 1880) — Caribbean
  - Olios antiguensis columbiensis Schmidt, 1971 — Colombia
- Olios argelasius (Walckenaer, 1806) (type) — Mediterranean
- Olios aristophanei Lessert, 1936 — Mozambique
- Olios artemis Hogg, 1916 — New Guinea
- Olios atomarius Simon, 1880 — Peru
- Olios attractus Petrunkevitch, 1911 — Brazil
- Olios audax (Banks, 1909) — Costa Rica
- Olios aurantiacus Mello-Leitão, 1918 — Brazil
- Olios auricomis (Simon, 1880) — Tanzania (Zanzibar)
- Olios banananus Strand, 1916 — Congo
- Olios batesi (Pocock, 1900) — Cameroon
- Olios baulnyi (Simon, 1874) — Morocco, Senegal, Sudan
- Olios benitensis (Pocock, 1900) — Cameroon
- Olios berlandi Roewer, 1951 — New Caledonia
- Olios bhattacharjeei (Saha & Raychaudhuri, 2007) — India
- Olios bhavnagarensis Sethi & Tikader, 1988 — India
- Olios biarmatus Lessert, 1925 — South Africa
- Olios bivittatus Roewer, 1951 — Guyana
- Olios bombilius (F. O. Pickard-Cambridge, 1899) — Peru
- Olios brachycephalus Lawrence, 1938 — South Africa
- Olios bungarensis Strand, 1913 — Indonesia (Sumatra)
- Olios canalae Berland, 1924 — New Caledonia
- Olios canariensis (Lucas, 1838) — Canary Is.
- Olios caprinus Mello-Leitão, 1918 — Brazil
- Olios cayanus Taczanowski, 1872 — Brazil, French Guiana
- Olios ceylonicus (Leardi, 1902) — Sri Lanka
- Olios chelifer Lawrence, 1937 — South Africa
- Olios chiracanthiformis (Strand, 1906) — Ethiopia
- Olios chubbi Lessert, 1923 — South Africa
- Olios clarus (Keyserling, 1880) — Mexico
- Olios claviger (Pocock, 1901) — Zimbabwe
- Olios coccineiventris (Simon, 1880) — Indonesia (Moluccas), New Guinea
- Olios coenobitus Fage, 1926 — Madagascar
- Olios conspersipes (Thorell, 1899) — Cameroon
- Olios corallinus Schmidt, 1971 — Ecuador
- Olios correvoni Lessert, 1921 — East Africa
  - Olios correvoni choupangensis Lessert, 1936 — Mozambique
  - Olios correvoni nigrifrons Lawrence, 1928 — Southern Africa
- Olios crassus (Banks, 1909) — Costa Rica
- Olios croseiceps (Pocock, 1898) — Malawi
- Olios darlingi (Pocock, 1901) — Zimbabwe
- Olios debalae (Biswas & Roy, 2005) — India
- Olios debilipes Mello-Leitão, 1945 — Argentina
- Olios derasus (C. L. Koch, 1845) — South Africa
- Olios detritus (C. L. Koch, 1845) — South Africa
- Olios diao Jäger, 2012 — Laos
- Olios digitalis Eydoux & Souleyet, 1841 — Unknown
- Olios digitatus Sun, Li & Zhang, 2011 — China
- Olios discolorichelis Caporiacco, 1947 — Guyana
- Olios durlaviae Biswas & Raychaudhuri, 2005 — Bangladesh
- Olios erraticus Fage, 1926 — Madagascar
- Olios erroneus O. Pickard-Cambridge, 1890 — Guatemala to Venezuela
- Olios extensus Berland, 1924 — New Caledonia
- Olios exterritorialis Strand, 1907 — Indonesia (Java or Seram)
- Olios faesi Lessert, 1933 — Angola
- Olios fasciatus (Keyserling, 1880) — Peru, Brazil
- Olios fasciculatus Simon, 1880 — USA (probably mislabeled), Tanzania
- Olios fasciiventris Simon, 1880 — Tanzania (Zanzibar)
- Olios feldmanni Strand, 1915 — Cameroon
- Olios ferox (Thorell, 1892) — Indonesia or Australia
- Olios fimbriatus Chrysanthus, 1965 — New Guinea
- Olios flavens Nicolet, 1849 — Chile
- Olios flavidus (O. Pickard-Cambridge, 1885) — China (Yarkand)
- Olios flavovittatus (Caporiacco, 1935) — Pakistan
- Olios floweri Lessert, 1921 — Ethiopia, East Africa
- Olios fonticola (Pocock, 1902) — South Africa
- Olios formosus Banks, 1929 — Panama
- Olios francoisi (Simon, 1898) — New Caledonia (Loyalty Is.)
- Olios freyi Lessert, 1929 — Congo
- Olios fugax (O. Pickard-Cambridge, 1885) — Pakistan, China (Yarkand)
- Olios fuhrmanni Strand, 1914 — St. Thomas
- Olios fuligineus (Pocock, 1901) — India
- Olios fulvithorax Berland, 1924 — New Caledonia
- Olios galapagoensis Banks, 1902 — Ecuador (Galapagos Is.)
- Olios gentilis (Karsch, 1879) — West Africa
- Olios giganteus Keyserling, 1884 — USA, Mexico
- Olios gravelyi Sethi & Tikader, 1988 — India
- Olios greeni (Pocock, 1901) — Sri Lanka
- Olios guineibius Strand, 1911 — New Guinea
- Olios guttipes (Simon, 1897) — South Africa
- Olios hampsoni (Pocock, 1901) — India
- Olios helvus (Keyserling, 1880) — Colombia
- Olios hirtus (Karsch, 1879) — Sri Lanka
- Olios hoplites Caporiacco, 1941 — Ethiopia
- Olios humboldtianus Berland, 1924 — New Caledonia
- Olios hyeroglyphicus Mello-Leitão, 1918 — Brazil
- Olios inaequipes (Simon, 1890) — Indonesia (Sunda Is.)
- Olios insignifer Chrysanthus, 1965 — New Guinea
- Olios insulanus (Thorell, 1881) — Indonesia (Kei Is.)
- Olios iranii (Pocock, 1901) — Iraq, Pakistan, India
- Olios isongonis Strand, 1915 — Cameroon
- Olios ituricus Strand, 1913 — Central Africa
- Olios jaenicke Jäger, 2012 — Laos
- Olios jaldaparaensis Saha & Raychaudhuri, 2007 — India
- Olios japonicus Jäger & Ono, 2000 — Japan (Ryukyu Is.)
- Olios kassenjicola Strand, 1916 — Central Africa
- Olios keyserlingi (Simon, 1880) — Brazil
- Olios kiranae Sethi & Tikader, 1988 — India
- Olios kruegeri (Simon, 1897) — South Africa
- Olios lacticolor Lawrence, 1952 — South Africa
- Olios lamarcki (Latreille, 1806) — Madagascar to India, Sri Lanka, Bangladesh
  - Olios lamarcki taprobanicus Strand, 1913 — Sri Lanka
- Olios lepidus Vellard, 1924 — Brazil
- Olios longespinus Caporiacco, 1947 — East Africa
- Olios longipedatus Roewer, 1951 — Brazil
- Olios longipedes Roewer, 1951 — Sudan
- Olios lutescens (Thorell, 1894) — Pakistan, Myanmar, Indonesia (Sumatra, Java)
- Olios luteus (Keyserling, 1880) — Peru
- Olios machadoi Lawrence, 1952 — South Africa
- Olios macroepigynus Soares, 1944 — Brazil
- Olios maculatus (Blackwall, 1862) — Brazil, Caribbean?
- Olios maculinotatus Strand, 1909 — South Africa
- Olios mahabangkawitus Barrion & Litsinger, 1995 — Philippines
- Olios malagassus Strand, 1907 — Madagascar
  - Olios malagassus septifer Strand, 1908 — Madagascar
- Olios marshalli (Pocock, 1898) — South Africa
- Olios mathani (Simon, 1880) — Peru, Brazil
- Olios menghaiensis (Wang & Zhang, 1990) — China
- Olios milleti (Pocock, 1901) — India, Sri Lanka
- Olios minensis (Mello-Leitão, 1917) — Brazil
- Olios monticola Berland, 1924 — New Caledonia
- Olios morbillosus (MacLeay, 1827) — Australia
- Olios mordax (O. Pickard-Cambridge, 1899) — Madagascar
- Olios muang Jäger & Praxaysombath, 2009 — Laos
- Olios mutabilis Mello-Leitão, 1917 — Brazil
- Olios mygalinus Doleschall, 1857 — Indonesia (Moluccas), New Guinea
  - Olios mygalinus cinctipes Merian, 1911 — Indonesia (Sulawesi)
  - Olios mygalinus nigripalpis Merian, 1911 — Indonesia (Sulawesi)
- Olios nanningensis (Hu & Ru, 1988) — China
- Olios neocaledonicus Berland, 1924 — New Caledonia
- Olios nigrifrons (Simon, 1897) — Indonesia (Java)
- Olios nigristernis (Simon, 1880) — Brazil
- Olios nigriventris Taczanowski, 1872 — French Guiana
- Olios nossibeensis Strand, 1907 — Madagascar
- Olios oberzelleri Kritscher, 1966 — New Caledonia
- Olios obesulus (Pocock, 1901) — India
- Olios obscurus (Keyserling, 1880) — Mexico, Costa Rica, Panama
- Olios obtusus (F. O. Pickard-Cambridge, 1900) — Guatemala
- Olios occidentalis (Karsch, 1879) — Congo
- Olios orchiticus Mello-Leitão, 1930 — Brazil
- Olios ornatus (Thorell, 1877) — Indonesia (Sulawesi)
- Olios oubatchensis Berland, 1924 — New Caledonia
- Olios paalongus Barrion & Litsinger, 1995 — Philippines
- Olios pacifer Lessert, 1921 — Congo, East Africa
- Olios paenuliformis Strand, 1916 — West Africa
- Olios pagurus Walckenaer, 1837 — Australia
- Olios paraensis (Keyserling, 1880) — Brazil
- Olios patagiatus (Simon, 1897) — India
- Olios pellucidus (Keyserling, 1880) — Peru
- Olios perezi Barrion & Litsinger, 1995 — Philippines
- Olios peruvianus Roewer, 1951 — Peru
- Olios phipsoni (Pocock, 1899) — India
- Olios pictitarsis (Simon, 1880) — Peru, Brazil
- Olios plumipes Mello-Leitão, 1937 — Brazil
- Olios praecinctus (L. Koch, 1865) — Australia (New South Wales)
- Olios princeps Hogg, 1914 — New Guinea
- Olios provocator Walckenaer, 1837 — South Africa
- Olios pulchripes (Thorell, 1899) — Cameroon
- Olios punctipes Simon, 1884 — India to Indonesia (Sumatra)
  - Olios punctipes sordidatus (Thorell, 1895) — Myanmar
- Olios puniceus (Simon, 1880) — Peru, Brazil
- Olios punjabensis Dyal, 1935 — Pakistan
- Olios pusillus Simon, 1880 — Madagascar
- Olios pyrozonis (Pocock, 1901) — India
- Olios quesitio Moradmand, 2013 — Ethiopia
- Olios quinquelineatus Taczanowski, 1872 — French Guiana
- Olios roeweri Caporiacco, 1955 — Guyana
- Olios rosettii (Leardi, 1901) — India
- Olios rotundiceps (Pocock, 1901) — India
- Olios rubripes Taczanowski, 1872 — French Guiana
- Olios rubriventris (Thorell, 1881) — Indonesia (Moluccas), New Guinea
- Olios rufilatus (Pocock, 1900) — Cameroon, Congo
- Olios rufus (Keyserling, 1880) — Colombia
- Olios ruwenzoricus Strand, 1913 — Central Africa
- Olios sanctivincenti (Simon, 1898) — St. Vincent
- Olios sanguinifrons (Simon, 1906) — Pakistan, India
- Olios scalptor Jäger & Ono, 2001 — Taiwan
- Olios schonlandi (Pocock, 1900) — South Africa
- Olios senilis Simon, 1880 — India, Sri Lanka
- Olios sericeus (Kroneberg, 1875) — Georgia, Central Asia, Iran, Afghanistan
- Olios sexpunctatus Caporiacco, 1947 — Guyana
- Olios sherwoodi Lessert, 1929 — Congo
- Olios similaris (Rainbow, 1898) — New Guinea
- Olios similis (O. Pickard-Cambridge, 1890) — Guatemala
- Olios simoni (O. Pickard-Cambridge, 1890) — Guatemala
- Olios sjostedti Lessert, 1921 — Tanzania, Botswana, South Africa
- Olios skwarrae (Roewer, 1933) — Mexico
- Olios socotranus (Pocock, 1903) — Yemen (Socotra)
- Olios somalicus Caporiacco, 1940 — Somalia
- Olios soratensis Strand, 1907 — Bolivia
- Olios spenceri Pocock, 1896 — South Africa
- Olios spiculosus (Pocock, 1901) — South Africa
- Olios spinipalpis (Pocock, 1901) — Zimbabwe
- Olios stictopus (Pocock, 1898) — South Africa
- Olios stimulator (Simon, 1897) — India
- Olios strandi Kolosváry, 1934 — New Guinea
- Olios striatus (Blackwall, 1867) — India
- Olios stylifer (F. O. Pickard-Cambridge, 1900) — Mexico, Brazil
- Olios suavis (O. Pickard-Cambridge, 1876) — Cyprus, Israel, Egypt
- Olios subadultus Mello-Leitão, 1930 — Brazil
- Olios subpusillus Strand, 1907 — Madagascar
- Olios sulphuratus (Thorell, 1899) — Cameroon
- Olios suung Jäger, 2012 — Laos
- Olios sylvaticus (Blackwall, 1862) — Brazil
- Olios tamerlani Roewer, 1951 — New Guinea
- Olios tarandus (Simon, 1897) — India
- Olios tener (Thorell, 1891) — Pakistan, India, Myanmar
- Olios tiantongensis (Zhang & Kim, 1996) — China
- Olios tigrinus (Keyserling, 1880) — Peru
- Olios tikaderi Kundu, Biswas & Raychaudhuri, 1999 — India
- Olios timidus (O. Pickard-Cambridge, 1885) — China (Yarkand)
- Olios triarmatus Lessert, 1936 — Mozambique
- Olios trifurcatus (Pocock, 1900) — Cameroon
- Olios trinitatis Strand, 1916 — Trinidad
- Olios valenciae Strand, 1916 — Venezuela
- Olios variatus (Thorell, 1899) — Cameroon
- Olios velox (Simon, 1880) — Peru
- Olios ventrosus Nicolet, 1849 — Chile
- Olios vitiosus Vellard, 1924 — Brazil
- Olios vittifemur Strand, 1916 — Central Africa
- Olios werneri (Simon, 1906) — Sudan
- Olios wolfi Strand, 1911 — New Guinea
- Olios wroughtoni (Simon, 1897) — India
- Olios yucatanus Chamberlin, 1925 — Mexico
- Olios zebra (Thorell, 1881) — Indonesia (Moluccas)
- Olios zulu Simon, 1880 — South Africa

=== Orchestrella ===
Orchestrella Lawrence, 1965 - Incertae Sedis

- Orchestrella caroli Lawrence, 1966 — Namibia
- Orchestrella longipes Lawrence, 1965 (type) — Namibia

=== Origes ===
Origes Simon, 1897 - Incertae Sedis

- Origes chloroticus Mello-Leitão, 1945 — Argentina
- Origes nigrovittatus (Keyserling, 1880) — Peru
- Origes pollens Simon, 1897 (type) — Ecuador

== P ==
=== Paenula ===
Paenula Simon, 1897 - Incertae Sedis

- Paenula paupercula Simon, 1897 (type) — Ecuador

=== Palystella ===
Palystella Lawrence, 1928 - Incertae Sedis

- Palystella browni Lawrence, 1962 — Namibia
- Palystella namaquensis Lawrence, 1938 — Namibia
- Palystella pallida Lawrence, 1938 — Namibia
- Palystella sexmaculata Lawrence, 1928 (type) — Namibia

=== Palystes ===
Palystes

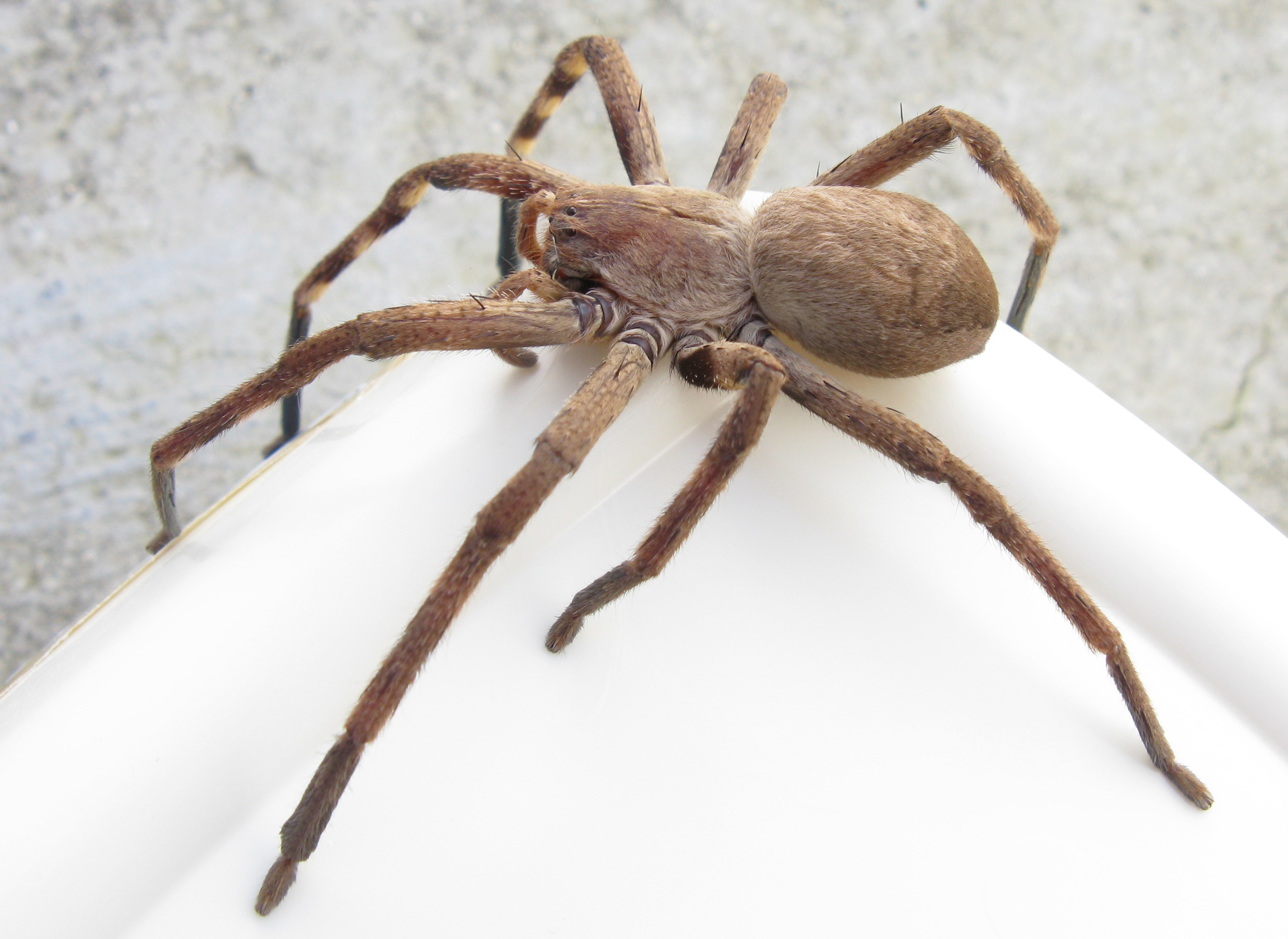
Palystes castaneus, female

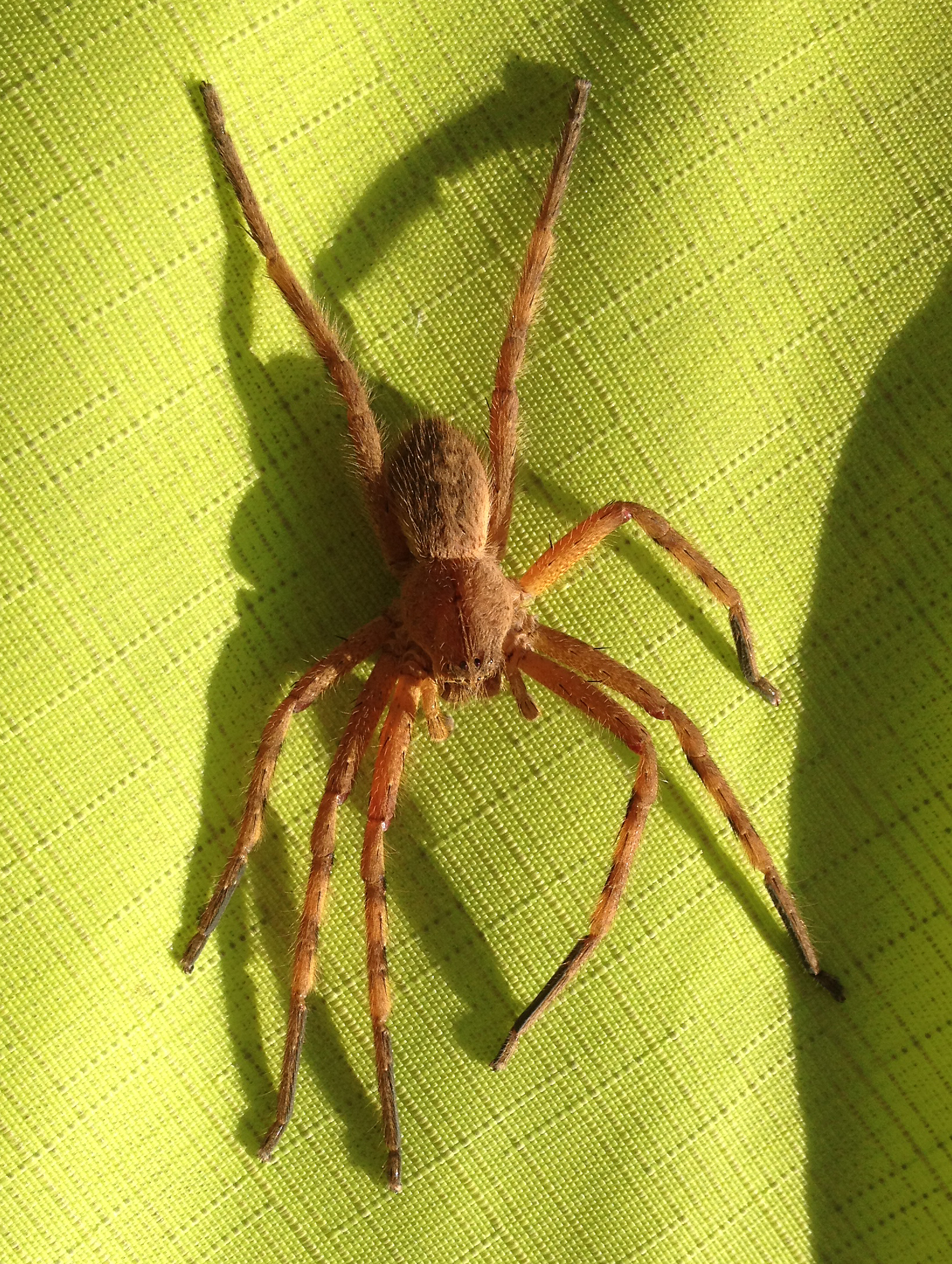
Palystes martinfilmeri

Palystes L. Koch, 1875 - Palystinae

- Palystes ansiedippenaarae Croeser, 1996 — South Africa
- Palystes castaneus (Latreille, 1819) (type) — South Africa
- Palystes convexus Strand, 1907 — Madagascar
- Palystes crawshayi Pocock, 1902 — Lesotho
- Palystes ellioti Pocock, 1896 — Central, East Africa
- Palystes flavidus Simon, 1897 — India
- Palystes fornasinii (Pavesi, 1881) — Mozambique
- Palystes hoehneli Simon, 1890 — Kenya, Tanzania
- Palystes johnstoni Pocock, 1896 — Botswana, Zimbabwe, Malawi, Mozambique, Uganda
- Palystes karooensis Croeser, 1996 — South Africa
- Palystes kreutzmanni Jäger & Kunz, 2010 — South Africa
- Palystes leppanae Pocock, 1902 — South Africa
- Palystes leroyorum Croeser, 1996 — South Africa
- Palystes lunatus Pocock, 1896 — South Africa
- Palystes martinfilmeri Croeser, 1996 — South Africa
- Palystes perornatus Pocock, 1900 — South Africa
- Palystes pinnotheres (Walckenaer, 1805) — Australia (New South Wales), New Caledonia
- Palystes reticulatus Rainbow, 1899 — Santa Cruz Is.
- Palystes spiralis Strand, 1907 — Madagascar
- Palystes stilleri Croeser, 1996 — South Africa
- Palystes stuarti Croeser, 1996 — South Africa
- Palystes superciliosus L. Koch, 1875 — Southern Africa

=== Panaretella ===
Panaretella Lawrence, 1937 - Palystinae

- Panaretella distincta (Pocock, 1896) (type) — South Africa
- Panaretella immaculata Lawrence, 1952 — South Africa
- Panaretella minor Lawrence, 1952 — South Africa
- Panaretella scutata (Pocock, 1902) — South Africa
- Panaretella zuluana Lawrence, 1937 — South Africa

=== Pandercetes ===
Pandercetes

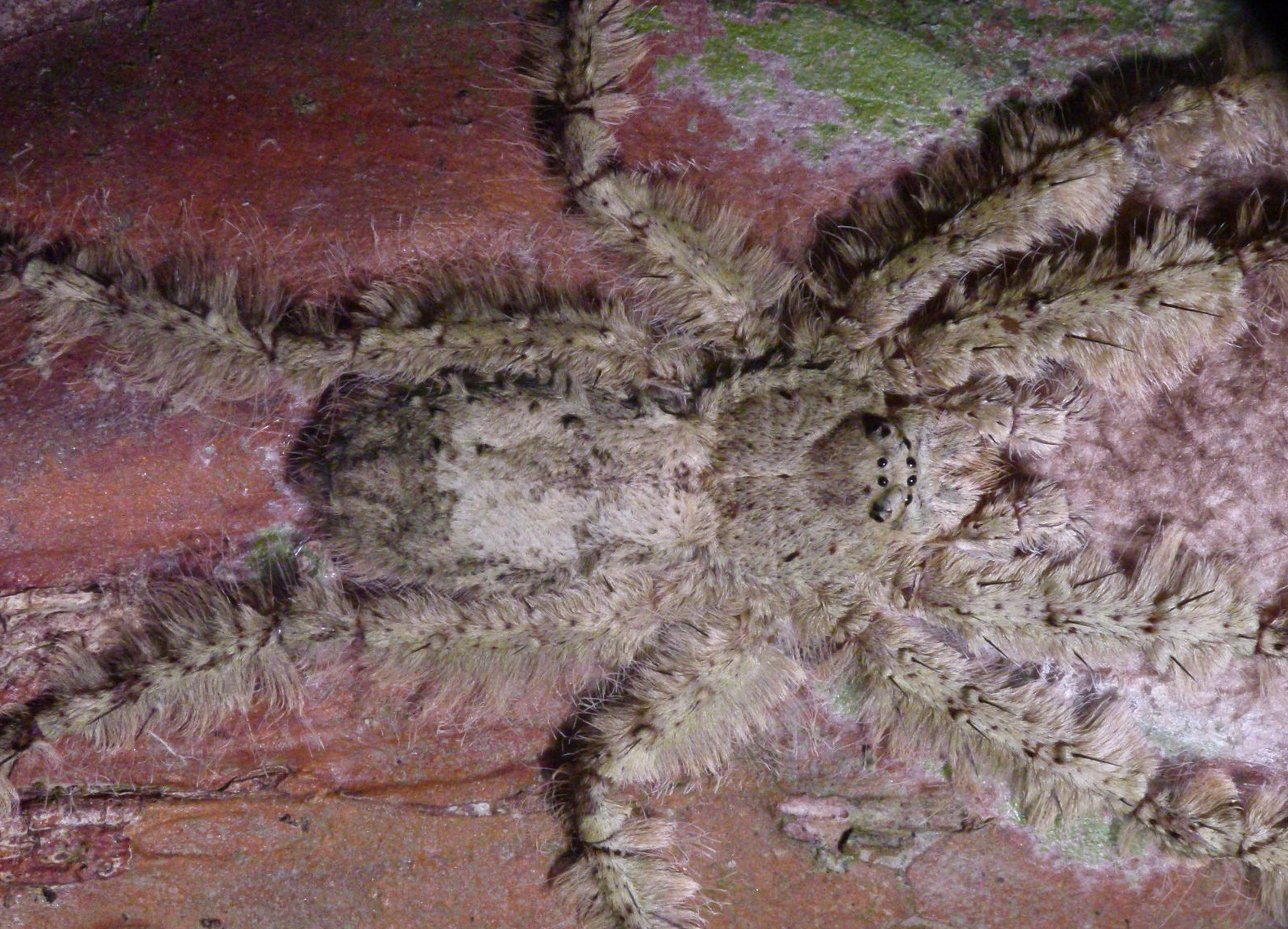
Pandercetes celatus

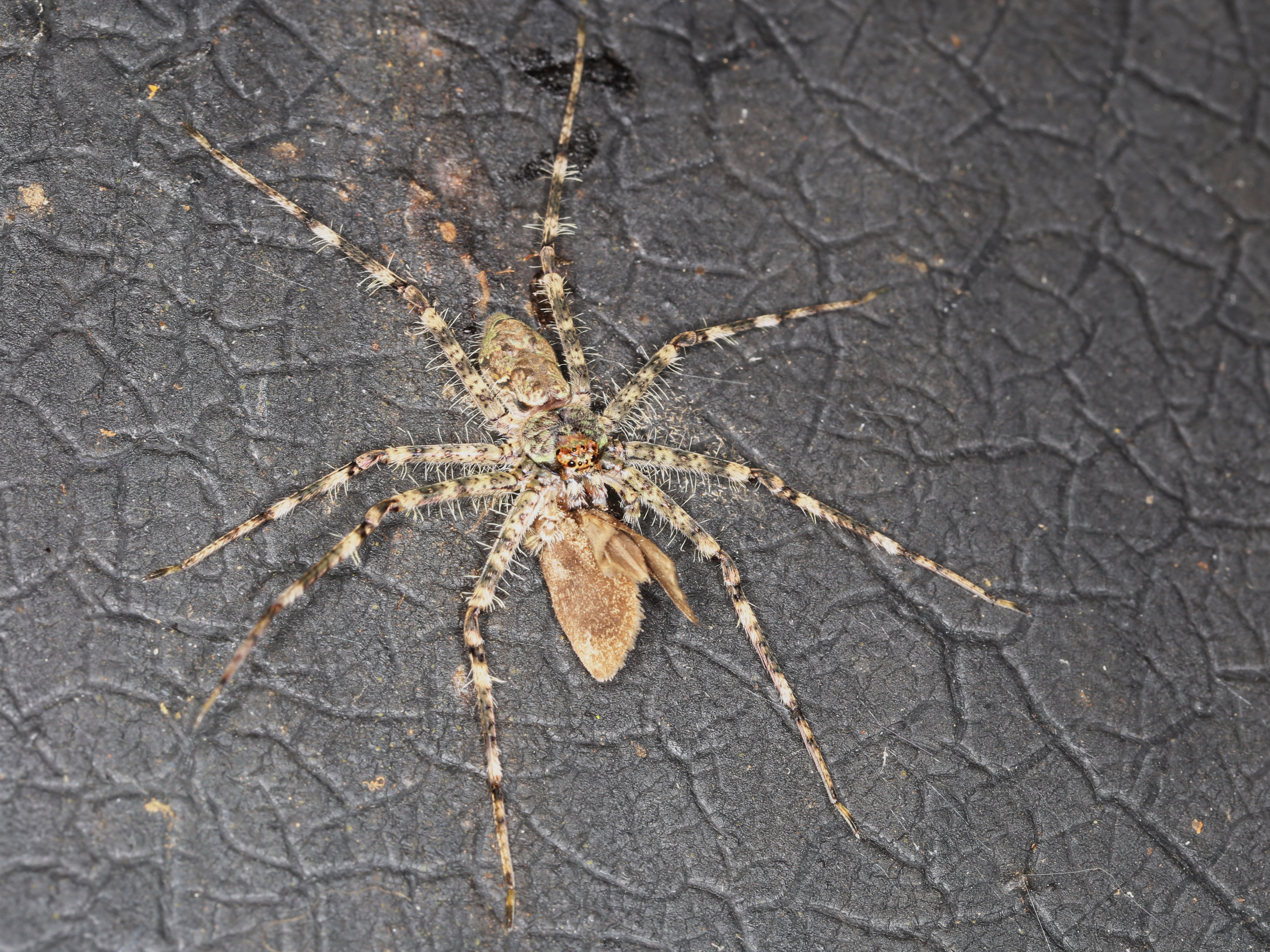
Lichen huntsman spider
(Pandercetes gracilis)

Pandercetes L. Koch, 1875 - Heteropodinae

- Pandercetes celatus Pocock, 1899 — India
- Pandercetes celebensis Merian, 1911 — Indonesia (Sulawesi)
  - Pandercetes celebensis vulcanicola Merian, 1911 — Indonesia (Sulawesi)
- Pandercetes decipiens Pocock, 1899 — India, Sri Lanka
- Pandercetes gracilis L. Koch, 1875 (type) — Indonesia (Moluccas, Sulawesi), New Guinea, Australia (Queensland)
- Pandercetes isopus Thorell, 1881 — Indonesia (Moluccas), New Guinea
- Pandercetes longipes Thorell, 1881 — Papua New Guinea (Yule Is.)
- Pandercetes macilentus Thorell, 1895 — Myanmar
- Pandercetes malleator Thorell, 1890 — Malaysia, Indonesia (Aru Is.)
- Pandercetes manoius Roewer, 1938 — New Guinea
- Pandercetes niger Merian, 1911 — Indonesia (Sulawesi)
- Pandercetes nigrogularis (Simon, 1897) — Indonesia (Java)
- Pandercetes ochreus Hogg, 1922 — Vietnam
- Pandercetes palliventris Strand, 1911 — New Guinea
- Pandercetes peronianus (Walckenaer, 1837) — New Zealand
- Pandercetes plumipes (Doleschall, 1859) — Sri Lanka, Indonesia (Ambon), New Guinea
- Pandercetes plumosus Pocock, 1899 — Papua New Guinea (New Britain)

=== Parapalystes ===
Parapalystes Croeser, 1996 - Palystinae

- Parapalystes cultrifer (Pocock, 1900) — South Africa
- Parapalystes euphorbiae Croeser, 1996 (type) — South Africa
- Parapalystes lycosinus (Pocock, 1900) — South Africa
- Parapalystes megacephalus (C. L. Koch, 1845) — South Africa
- Parapalystes whiteae (Pocock, 1902) — South Africa

=== Pediana ===
Pediana Simon, 1880 - Deleninae

- Pediana aurochelis Strand, 1907 — Indonesia (Java)
- Pediana horni (Hogg, 1896) — Australia
- Pediana longbottomi Hirst, 1996 — Australia (Western Australia)
- Pediana mainae Hirst, 1995 — Australia (Northern Territory)
- Pediana occidentalis Hogg, 1903 — Australia (Western Australia, South Australia)
- Pediana paradoxa Hirst, 1996 — Australia (South Australia)
- Pediana regina (L. Koch, 1875) (type) — Australia (Western Australia, Queensland, New South Wales)
  - Pediana regina isopedina Strand, 1913 — Central Australia
- Pediana temmei Hirst, 1996 — Australia (South Australia)
- Pediana tenuis Hogg, 1903 — Australia (Western Australia, South Australia)
- Pediana webberae Hirst, 1996 — Australia (Northern Territory)

=== Pleorotus ===
Pleorotus Simon, 1898 - Sparianthinae

- Pleorotus braueri Simon, 1898 (type) — Seychelles

=== Polybetes ===
Polybetes

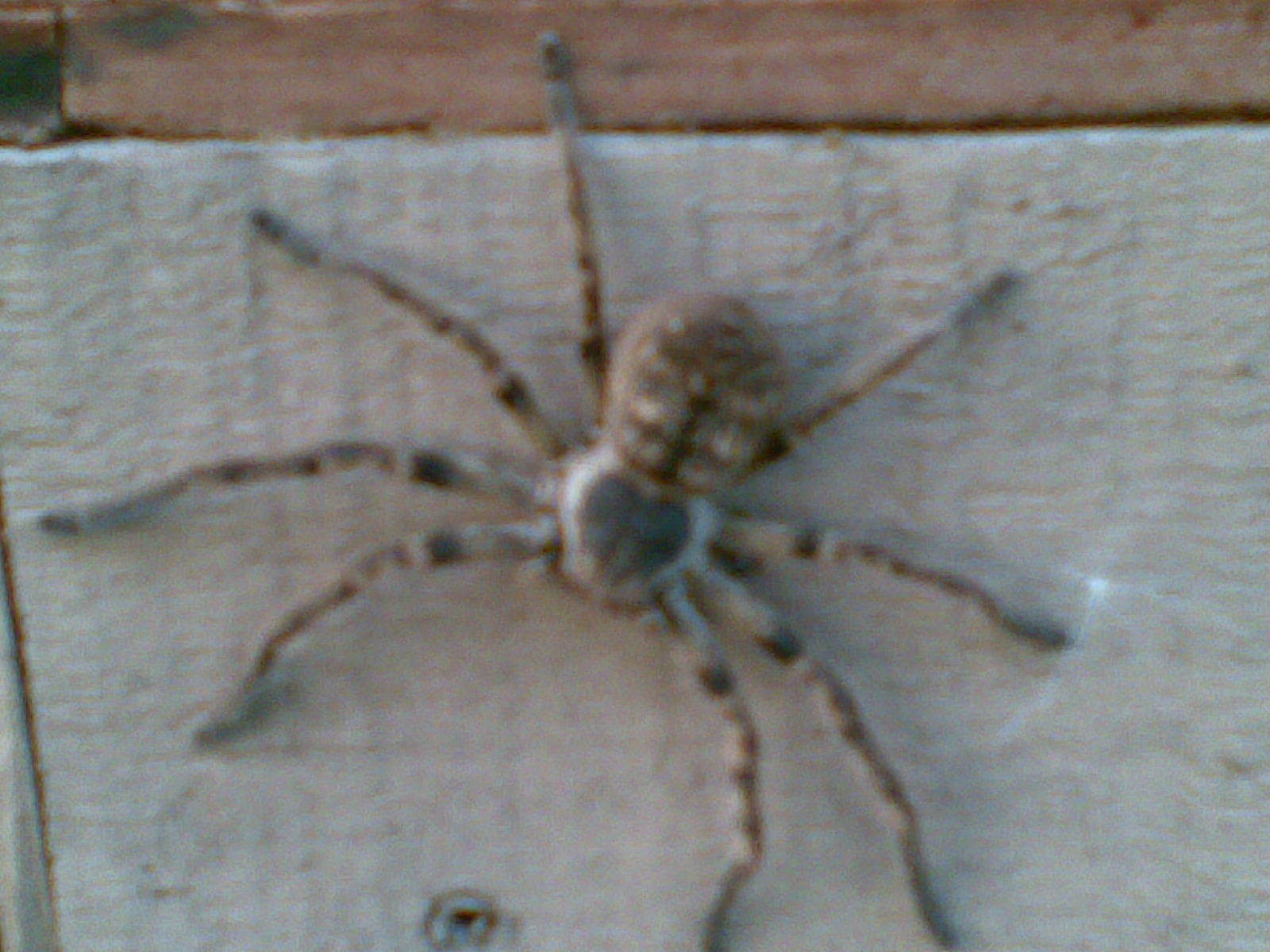
Polybetes pythagoricus

Polybetes Simon, 1897 - Sparassinae

- Polybetes delfini Simon, 1904 — Chile
- Polybetes germaini Simon, 1897 — Brazil, Paraguay, Argentina
- Polybetes martius (Nicolet, 1849) (type) — Chile, Argentina
- Polybetes obnuptus Simon, 1897 — Bolivia, Argentina
- Polybetes pallidus Mello-Leitão, 1941 — Argentina
- Polybetes parvus (Järvi, 1914) — Paraguay
- Polybetes punctulatus Mello-Leitão, 1944 — Argentina
- Polybetes pythagoricus (Holmberg, 1875) — Brazil, Guyana, Uruguay, Paraguay, Argentina
- Polybetes quadrifoveatus (Järvi, 1914) — Argentina
- Polybetes rapidus (Keyserling, 1880) — Suriname to Argentina
- Polybetes rubrosignatus Mello-Leitão, 1943 — Brazil
- Polybetes trifoveatus (Järvi, 1914) — Paraguay, Argentina

=== Prusias ===
Prusias O. Pickard-Cambridge, 1892 - Incertae Sedis

- Prusias brasiliensis Mello-Leitão, 1915 — Brazil
- Prusias lanceolatus Simon, 1897 — Brazil or Peru
- Prusias nugalis O. Pickard-Cambridge, 1892 (type) — Mexico, Panama
- Prusias semotus (O. Pickard-Cambridge, 1892) — Panama

=== Prychia ===
Prychia L. Koch, 1875 - Incertae Sedis

- Prychia gracilis L. Koch, 1875 (type) — New Guinea to Fiji, Polynesia
- Prychia maculata Karsch, 1878 — New Guinea
- Prychia pallidula Strand, 1911 — New Guinea
- Prychia suavis Simon, 1897 — Philippines

=== Pseudomicrommata ===
Pseudomicrommata

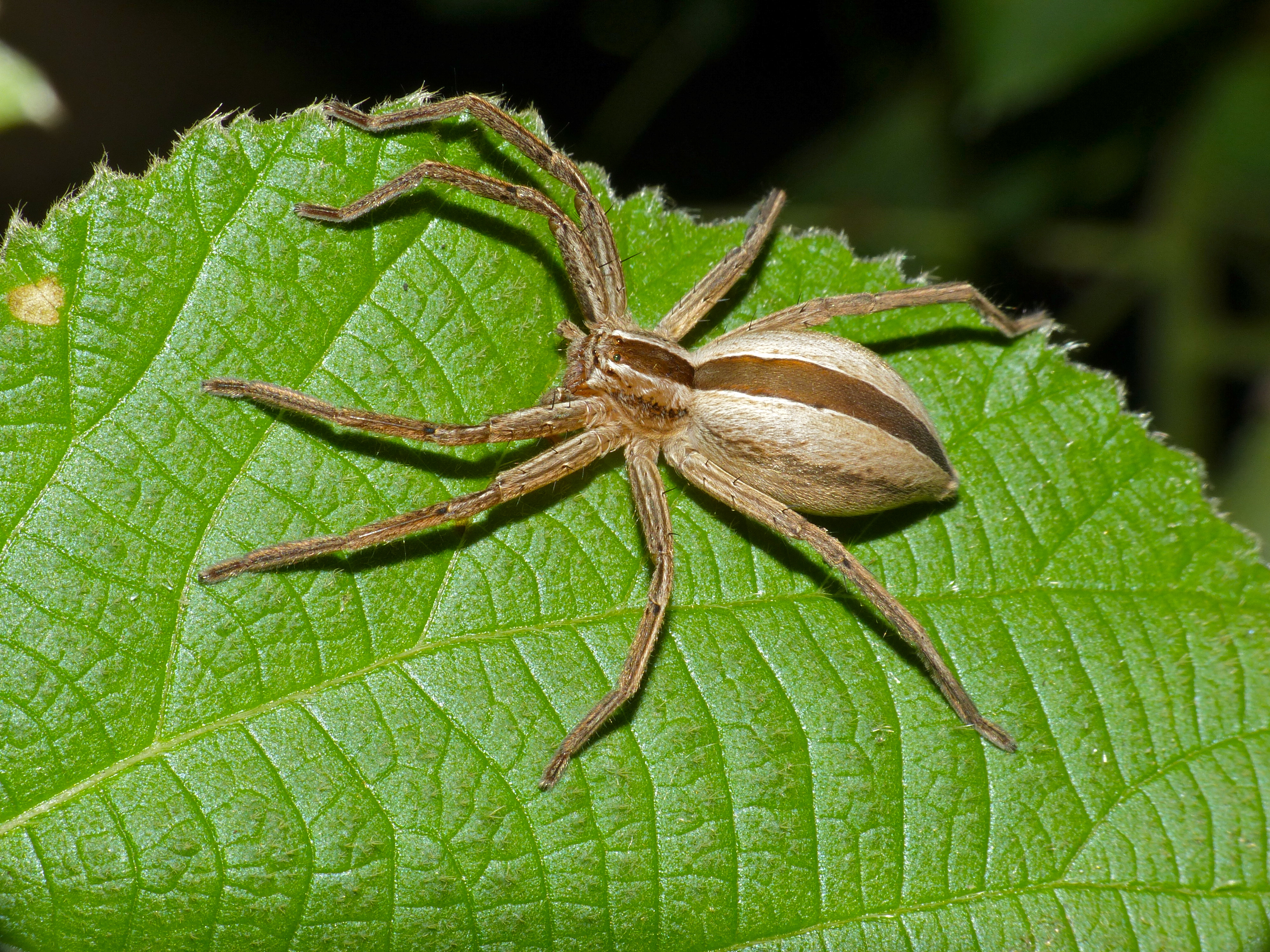
Pseudomicrommata longipes

Pseudomicrommata Järvi, 1914 - Incertae Sedis

- Pseudomicrommata longipes (Bösenberg & Lenz, 1895) (type) — Africa
- Pseudomicrommata mary Moradmand, 2015 — Guinea, Ivory Coast
- Pseudomicrommata schoemanae Moradmand, 2015 — Cameroon
- Pseudomicrommata vittigera (Simon, 1897) — Namibia, South Africa

=== Pseudopoda ===
Pseudopoda

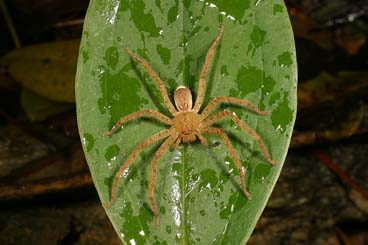
Pseudopoda spirembolus, female

Pseudopoda Jäger, 2000 - Heteropodinae

- Pseudopoda abnormis Jäger, 2001 — India
- Pseudopoda acuminata Zhang, Zhang & Zhang, 2013 — China
- Pseudopoda akashi (Sethi & Tikader, 1988) — India
- Pseudopoda albolineata Jäger, 2001 — Nepal
- Pseudopoda albonotata Jäger, 2001 — Bhutan
- Pseudopoda alta Jäger, 2001 — Nepal
- Pseudopoda amelia Jäger & Vedel, 2007 — China
- Pseudopoda anguilliformis Zhang, Jäger & Liu, 2017 — China
- Pseudopoda ashcharya Jäger & Kulkarni, 2016 — India
- Pseudopoda ausobskyi Jäger, 2001 — Nepal
- Pseudopoda bangaga Jäger, 2015 — Myanmar
- Pseudopoda biapicata Jäger, 2001 — Myanmar
- Pseudopoda bibulba (Xu & Yin, 2000) — China
- Pseudopoda bicruris Quan, Zhong & Liu, 2014 — China
- Pseudopoda birmanica Jäger, 2001 — Myanmar
- Pseudopoda brauni Jäger, 2001 — Nepal
- Pseudopoda breviducta Zhang, Zhang & Zhang, 2013 — China
- Pseudopoda cangschana Jäger & Vedel, 2007 — China
- Pseudopoda casaria (Simon, 1897) — India
- Pseudopoda chauki Jäger, 2001 — Nepal
- Pseudopoda chayuensis Zhao & Li, 2018 — China
- Pseudopoda cheppe Caleb, 2018 — India
- Pseudopoda chulingensis Jäger, 2001 — Nepal
- Pseudopoda coenobium Jäger, Li & Krehenwinkel, 2015 — China
- Pseudopoda colubrina Zhao & Li, 2018 — Myanmar
- Pseudopoda conaensis Zhao & Li, 2018 — China
- Pseudopoda confusa Jäger, Pathoumthong & Vedel, 2006 — Laos
- Pseudopoda contentio Jäger & Vedel, 2007 — China
- Pseudopoda contraria Jäger & Vedel, 2007 — China
- Pseudopoda cuneata Jäger, 2001 — Nepal
- Pseudopoda daliensis Jäger & Vedel, 2007 — China
- Pseudopoda dama Jäger, 2001 — Nepal
- Pseudopoda damana Jäger, 2001 — Nepal
- Pseudopoda dao Jäger, 2001 — Thailand
- Pseudopoda daxing Zhao & Li, 2018 — Myanmar
- Pseudopoda dhulensis Jäger, 2001 — Nepal
- Pseudopoda digitata Jäger & Vedel, 2007 — China
- Pseudopoda diversipunctata Jäger, 2001 — Nepal
- Pseudopoda emei Zhang, Zhang & Zhang, 2013 — China
- Pseudopoda everesta Jäger, 2001 — Nepal
- Pseudopoda exigua (Fox, 1938) — China
- Pseudopoda exiguoides (Song & Zhu, 1999) — China
- Pseudopoda fabularis Jäger, 2008 — India
- Pseudopoda fissa Jäger & Vedel, 2005 — Vietnam
- Pseudopoda gemina Jäger, Pathoumthong & Vedel, 2006 — Laos
- Pseudopoda gexiao Zhao & Li, 2018 — Myanmar
- Pseudopoda gibberosa Zhang, Zhang & Zhang, 2013 — China
- Pseudopoda gogona Jäger, 2001 — Bhutan
- Pseudopoda gongschana Jäger & Vedel, 2007 — China
- Pseudopoda grahami (Fox, 1936) — China
- Pseudopoda grasshoffi Jäger, 2001 — Nepal
- Pseudopoda heteropodoides Jäger, 2001 — Nepal
- Pseudopoda hingstoni Jäger, 2001 — India
- Pseudopoda hirsuta Jäger, 2001 — Thailand
- Pseudopoda huberi Jäger, 2015 — Myanmar
- Pseudopoda huberti Jäger, 2001 — Nepal
- Pseudopoda hyatti Jäger, 2001 — Nepal
- Pseudopoda intermedia Jäger, 2001 — Myanmar
- Pseudopoda interposita Jäger & Vedel, 2007 — China
- Pseudopoda jirensis Jäger, 2001 — Nepal
- Pseudopoda kalinchoka Jäger, 2001 — Nepal
- Pseudopoda kasariana Jäger & Ono, 2002 — Japan
- Pseudopoda khimtensis Jäger, 2001 — Nepal
- Pseudopoda kullmanni Jäger, 2001 — Myanmar, Indonesia (Sumatra)
- Pseudopoda kunmingensis Sun & Zhang, 2012 — China
- Pseudopoda lacrimosa Zhang, Zhang & Zhang, 2013 — China
- Pseudopoda latembola Jäger, 2001 — Nepal
- Pseudopoda lushanensis (Wang, 1990) — China
- Pseudopoda lutea (Thorell, 1895) — Myanmar
- Pseudopoda maeklongensis Zhao & Li, 2018 — Thailand
- Pseudopoda marmorea Jäger, 2001 — Nepal
- Pseudopoda marsupia (Wang, 1991) — China, Thailand
- Pseudopoda martensi Jäger, 2001 — Nepal
- Pseudopoda martinae Jäger, 2001 — Nepal
- Pseudopoda martinschuberti Jäger, 2015 — Myanmar
- Pseudopoda mediana Quan, Zhong & Liu, 2014 — China
- Pseudopoda medogensis Zhao & Li, 2018 — China
- Pseudopoda megalopora Jäger, 2001 — Myanmar
- Pseudopoda minor Jäger, 2001 — India
- Pseudopoda monticola Jäger, 2001 — Nepal
- Pseudopoda namkhan Jäger, Pathoumthong & Vedel, 2006 — China, Vietnam, Laos
- Pseudopoda nanyueensis Tang & Yin, 2000 — China
- Pseudopoda nyingchiensis Zhao & Li, 2018 — China
- Pseudopoda obtusa Jäger & Vedel, 2007 — China
- Pseudopoda ohne Logunov & Jäger, 2015 — Vietnam
- Pseudopoda parvipunctata Jäger, 2001 — Thailand
- Pseudopoda peronata Zhang, Jäger & Liu, 2017 — China
- Pseudopoda perplexa Jäger, 2008 — India
- Pseudopoda pingu Jäger, 2015 — Myanmar
- Pseudopoda platembola Jäger, 2001 — Myanmar
- Pseudopoda prompta (O. Pickard-Cambridge, 1885) (type) — Pakistan, India
- Pseudopoda putaoensis Zhao & Li, 2018 — Myanmar
- Pseudopoda recta Jäger & Ono, 2001 — Taiwan
- Pseudopoda rhopalocera Yang, Chen, Chen & Zhang, 2009 — China
- Pseudopoda rivicola Jäger & Vedel, 2007 — China
- Pseudopoda robusta Zhang, Zhang & Zhang, 2013 — China
- Pseudopoda roganda Jäger & Vedel, 2007 — China
- Pseudopoda rufosulphurea Jäger, 2001 — Thailand
- Pseudopoda saetosa Jäger & Vedel, 2007 — China
- Pseudopoda schawalleri Jäger, 2001 — Nepal
- Pseudopoda schwendingeri Jäger, 2001 — Thailand
- Pseudopoda semiannulata Zhang, Zhang & Zhang, 2013 — China
- Pseudopoda serrata Jäger & Ono, 2001 — Taiwan
- Pseudopoda shacunensis Zhao & Li, 2018 — China
- Pseudopoda shillongensis (Sethi & Tikader, 1988) — India
- Pseudopoda shuo Zhao & Li, 2018 — China
- Pseudopoda shuqiangi Jäger & Vedel, 2007 — China
- Pseudopoda sicca Jäger, 2008 — India
- Pseudopoda sicyoidea Zhang, Jäger & Liu, 2017 — China
- Pseudopoda signata Jäger, 2001 — China
- Pseudopoda sinapophysis Jäger & Vedel, 2007 — China
- Pseudopoda sinopodoides Jäger, 2001 — Nepal
- Pseudopoda songi Jäger, 2008 — China
- Pseudopoda spiculata (Wang, 1990) — China
- Pseudopoda spirembolus Jäger & Ono, 2002 — Japan
- Pseudopoda straminiosa (Kundu, Biswas & Raychaudhuri, 1999) — India
- Pseudopoda subbirmanica Zhao & Li, 2018 — Myanmar
- Pseudopoda taibaischana Jäger, 2001 — China
- Pseudopoda thorelli Jäger, 2001 — Myanmar
- Pseudopoda tiantangensis Quan, Zhong & Liu, 2014 — China
- Pseudopoda tinjura Jäger, 2001 — Nepal
- Pseudopoda titan Zhao & Li, 2018 — Myanmar
- Pseudopoda tji Jäger, 2015 — Myanmar
- Pseudopoda triangula Zhang, Zhang & Zhang, 2013 — China
- Pseudopoda triapicata Jäger, 2001 — Nepal
- Pseudopoda trisuliensis Jäger, 2001 — Nepal
- Pseudopoda varia Jäger, 2001 — Nepal
- Pseudopoda virgata (Fox, 1936) — China
- Pseudopoda wamwo Jäger, 2015 — Myanmar
- Pseudopoda wang Jäger & Praxaysombath, 2009 — Laos
- Pseudopoda wu Jäger, Li & Krehenwinkel, 2015 — China
- Pseudopoda xia Zhao & Li, 2018 — Myanmar
- Pseudopoda yinae Jäger & Vedel, 2007 — China
- Pseudopoda yuanjiangensis Zhao & Li, 2018 — China
- Pseudopoda yunnanensis (Yang & Hu, 2001) — China
- Pseudopoda zhangi Fu & Zhu, 2008 — China
- Pseudopoda zhangmuensis (Hu & Li, 1987) — China
- Pseudopoda zhejiangensis (Zhang & Kim, 1996) — China
- Pseudopoda zhenkangensis Yang, Chen, Chen & Zhang, 2009 — China
- Pseudopoda zixiensis Zhao & Li, 2018 — China

=== Pseudosparianthis ===
Pseudosparianthis Simon, 1887 - Sparianthinae

- Pseudosparianthis accentuata Caporiacco, 1955 — Venezuela
- Pseudosparianthis ambigua Caporiacco, 1938 — Guatemala
- Pseudosparianthis chickeringi (Gertsch, 1941) — Panama
- Pseudosparianthis fusca Simon, 1887 (type) — Brazil
- Pseudosparianthis jayuyae Petrunkevitch, 1930 — Puerto Rico
- Pseudosparianthis megalopalpa Caporiacco, 1954 — French Guiana
- † Pseudosparianthis pfeifferi Wunderlich, 1988 — Neogen Dominican amber
- Pseudosparianthis picta Simon, 1887 — Brazil, Guyana
- Pseudosparianthis ravida Simon, 1898 — St. Vincent

== Q ==
=== Quemedice ===
Quemedice Mello-Leitão, 1942 - Sparassinae

- Quemedice enigmaticus Mello-Leitão, 1942 (type) — Brazil, Argentina
- Quemedice piracuruca Rheims, Labarque & Ramírez, 2008 — Colombia, Brazil

== R ==
=== Remmius ===
Remmius Simon, 1897 - Incertae Sedis

- Remmius badius Roewer, 1961 — Senegal
- Remmius praecalvus Simon, 1910 — Congo
- Remmius quadridentatus Simon, 1903 — Equatorial Guinea
- Remmius vulpinus Simon, 1897 — Cameroon, Congo
- Remmius vultuosus Simon, 1897 (type) — Cameroon, Congo

=== Rhacocnemis ===
Rhacocnemis Simon, 1897 - Sparianthinae

- Rhacocnemis guttatus (Blackwall, 1877) (type) — Seychelles

=== Rhitymna ===
Rhitymna Simon, 1897 - Incertae Sedis

- Rhitymna ambae Jäger, 2003 — Indonesia (Java)
- Rhitymna bicolana (Barrion & Litsinger, 1995) — Philippines
- Rhitymna cursor (Thorell, 1894) — Singapore, Indonesia (Java)
- Rhitymna deelemanae Jäger, 2003 — Indonesia (Bali, Sumba)
- Rhitymna flava Schmidt & Krause, 1994 — Comoros
- Rhitymna flores Jäger, 2019 — Indonesia (Flores)
- Rhitymna gerdmangel Jäger, 2019 — Thailand, Malaysia
- Rhitymna hildebrandti Järvi, 1914 — Madagascar
- Rhitymna imerinensis (Vinson, 1863) — Madagascar
- Rhitymna kananggar Jäger, 2003 — Indonesia (Sumba)
- Rhitymna macilenta Quan & Liu, 2012 — China (Hainan)
- Rhitymna merianae Jäger, 2019 — Indonesia (Bali)
- Rhitymna occidentalis Jäger, 2003 — Sri Lanka
- Rhitymna pinangensis (Thorell, 1891) (type) — Thailand, Malaysia, Indonesia (Sumatra, Borneo, Java)
- Rhitymna plana Jäger, 2003 — Laos, Vietnam, Cambodia
- Rhitymna pseudokumanga (Barrion & Litsinger, 1995) — Philippines
- Rhitymna saccata Järvi, 1914 — East Africa
- Rhitymna senckenbergi Jäger, 2019 — Philippines (Negros)
- Rhitymna simplex Jäger, 2003 — Malaysia (Borneo)
- Rhitymna tangi Quan & Liu, 2012 — China (Hainan), Laos
- Rhitymna tuhodnigra (Barrion & Litsinger, 1995) — Philippines
- Rhitymna verruca (Wang, 1991) — China, Laos, Vietnam, Thailand
- Rhitymna xanthopus Simon, 1901 — Malaysia

== S ==
=== Sagellula ===
Sagellula Strand, 1942 - Incertae Sedis

- Sagellula octomunita (Dönitz & Strand, 1906) (type) — Japan
- Sagellula xizangensis (Hu, 2001) — China

=== Sampaiosia ===
Sampaiosia Mello-Leitão, 1930 - Incertae Sedis

- Sampaiosia crulsi Mello-Leitão, 1930 (type) — Brazil

=== Sarotesius ===
Sarotesius Pocock, 1898 - Palystinae

- Sarotesius melanognathus Pocock, 1898 (type) — East Africa

=== Sinopoda ===
Sinopoda

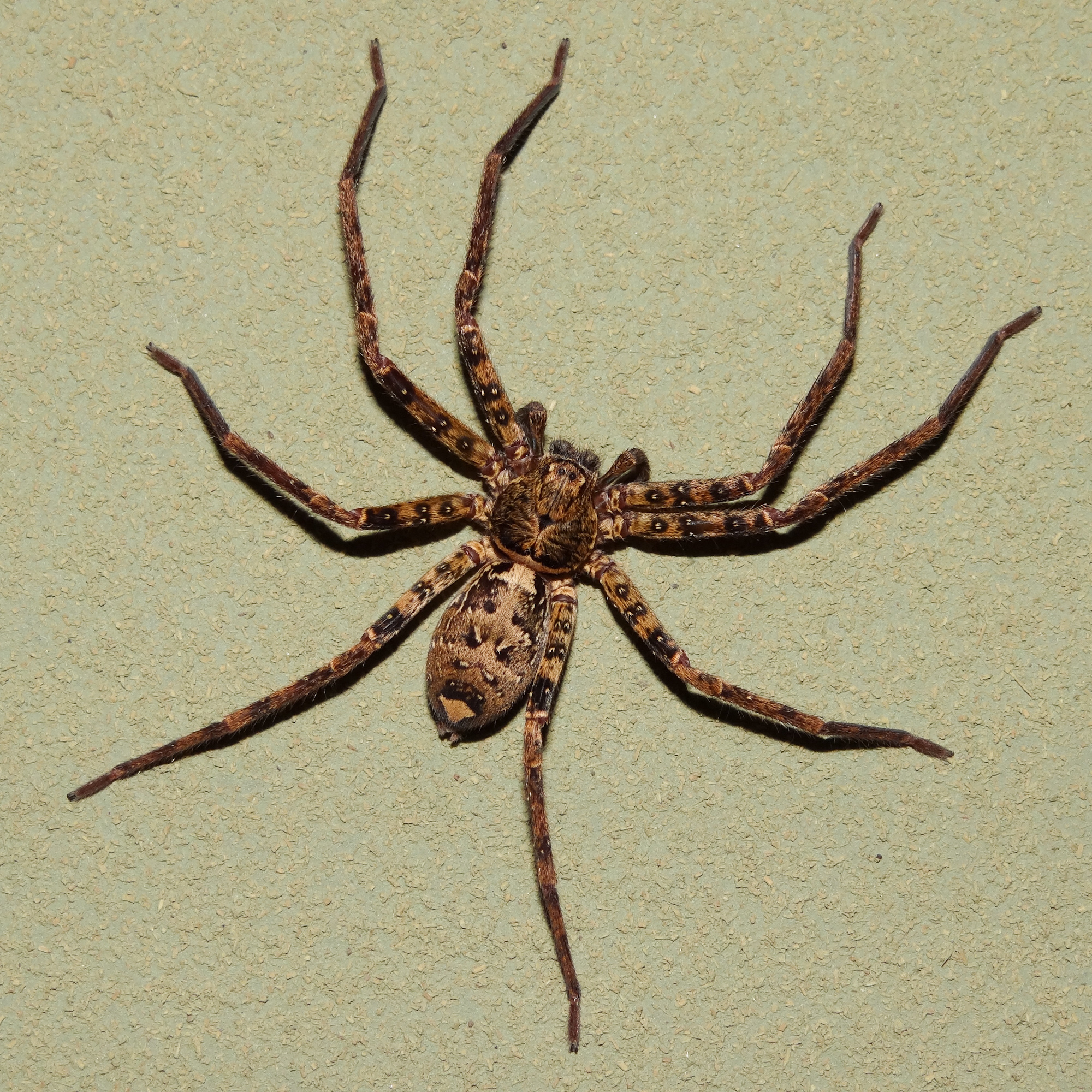
Sinopoda forcipata

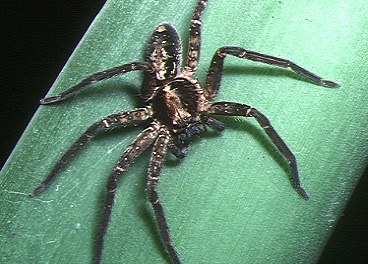
Sinopoda okinawana, female

Sinopoda Jäger, 1999 - Heteropodinae

- Sinopoda afflata Zhong, Cao & Liu, 2017 — China
- Sinopoda albofasciata Jäger & Ono, 2002 — Japan (Ryukyu Is.)
- Sinopoda altissima (Hu & Li, 1987) — China
- Sinopoda anguina Liu, Li & Jäger, 2008 — China
- Sinopoda angulata Jäger, Gao & Fei, 2002 — China
- Sinopoda aureola Kim, Lee & Lee, 2014 — Korea
- Sinopoda biguttata Lee, Lee & Kim, 2016 — Korea
- Sinopoda campanacea (Wang, 1990) — China
- Sinopoda chongan Xu, Yin & Peng, 2000 — China
- Sinopoda cochlearia Zhang, Zhang & Zhang, 2015 — China
- Sinopoda crassa Liu, Li & Jäger, 2008 — China
- Sinopoda dasani Kim, Lee, Lee & Hong, 2015 — Korea
- Sinopoda dashahe Zhu, Zhang, Zhang & Chen, 2005 — China
- Sinopoda dayong (Bao, Yin & Yan, 2000) — China
- Sinopoda derivata Jäger & Ono, 2002 — Japan
- Sinopoda exspectata Jäger & Ono, 2001 — Taiwan
- Sinopoda fasciculata Jäger, Gao & Fei, 2002 — China
- Sinopoda forcipata (Karsch, 1881) (type) — China, Korea, Japan
- Sinopoda fornicata Liu, Li & Jäger, 2008 — China
- Sinopoda globosa Zhang, Zhang & Zhang, 2015 — China
- Sinopoda grandispinosa Liu, Li & Jäger, 2008 — China
- Sinopoda guangyuanensis Zhong, Jäger, Chen & Liu, 2018 — China
- Sinopoda guap Jäger, 2012 — Laos
- Sinopoda hamata (Fox, 1937) — China
- Sinopoda himalayica (Hu & Li, 1987) — China
- Sinopoda horizontalis Zhong, Cao & Liu, 2017 — China
- Sinopoda koreana (Paik, 1968) — Korea, Japan
- Sinopoda licenti (Schenkel, 1953) — China
- Sinopoda liui Zhong, Cao & Liu, 2017 — China
- Sinopoda longiducta Zhang, Zhang & Zhang, 2015 — China
- Sinopoda longshan Yin, Peng, Yan & Bao, 2000 — China
- Sinopoda mamillata Zhong, Cao & Liu, 2017 — China
- Sinopoda mi Chen & Zhu, 2009 — China
- Sinopoda microphthalma (Fage, 1929) — Malaysia
- Sinopoda minschana (Schenkel, 1936) — China
- Sinopoda nigrobrunnea Lee, Lee & Kim, 2016 — Korea
- Sinopoda nuda Liu, Li & Jäger, 2008 — China
- Sinopoda ogatai Jäger & Ono, 2002 — Japan
- Sinopoda okinawana Jäger & Ono, 2000 — Japan (Ryukyu Is.)
- Sinopoda peet Jäger, 2012 — Laos
- Sinopoda pengi Song & Zhu, 1999 — China
- Sinopoda scurion Jäger, 2012 — Laos
- Sinopoda semicirculata Liu, Li & Jäger, 2008 — China
- Sinopoda separata Zhong, Cao & Liu, 2017 — China
- Sinopoda serpentembolus Zhang, Zhu, Jäger & Song, 2007 — China
- Sinopoda serrata (Wang, 1990) — China
- Sinopoda shennonga (Peng, Yin & Kim, 1996) — China
- Sinopoda sitkao Jäger, 2012 — Laos
- Sinopoda soong Jäger, 2012 — Laos
- Sinopoda steineri Jäger, 2012 — Laos
- Sinopoda stellata (Schenkel, 1963) — China
- Sinopoda stellatops Jäger & Ono, 2002 — Korea, Japan
- Sinopoda suang Jäger, 2012 — Laos
- Sinopoda taa Jäger, 2012 — Laos
- Sinopoda tanikawai Jäger & Ono, 2000 — Japan
- Sinopoda tengchongensis Fu & Zhu, 2008 — China
- Sinopoda tham Jäger, 2012 — Laos
- Sinopoda triangula Liu, Li & Jäger, 2008 — China
- Sinopoda undata Liu, Li & Jäger, 2008 — China
- Sinopoda wangi Song & Zhu, 1999 — China
- Sinopoda xieae Peng & Yin, 2001 — China
- Sinopoda yaojingensis Liu, Li & Jäger, 2008 — China

=== Sivalicus ===
Sivalicus Dyal, 1957 - Incertae Sedis

- Sivalicus viridis Dyal, 1957 (type) — India

=== Sparianthina ===
Sparianthina Banks, 1929 - Incertae Sedis

- Sparianthina adisi Jäger, Rheims & Labarque, 2009 — Venezuela
- Sparianthina deltshevi Jäger, Rheims & Labarque, 2009 — Venezuela
- Sparianthina gaita Rheims, 2011 — Venezuela
- Sparianthina milleri (Caporiacco, 1955) — Venezuela
- Sparianthina parang Rheims, 2011 — Tobago
- Sparianthina pumilla (Keyserling, 1880) — Colombia
- Sparianthina rufescens (Mello-Leitão, 1940) — Guyana
- Sparianthina saaristoi Jäger, Rheims & Labarque, 2009 — Venezuela
- Sparianthina selenopoides Banks, 1929 (type) — Costa Rica, Panama

=== Sparianthis ===
Sparianthis Simon, 1880 - Sparianthinae

- Sparianthis granadensis (Keyserling, 1880) (type) — Colombia

=== Spariolenus ===
Spariolenus Simon, 1880 - Heteropodinae

- Spariolenus aratta Moradmand & Jäger, 2011 — Iran
- Spariolenus buxa (Saha, Biswas & Raychaudhuri, 1995) — India
- Spariolenus fathpouri Moradmand, 2017 — Iran
- Spariolenus hormozii Moradmand, 2017 — Iran
- Spariolenus iranomaximus Moradmand & Jäger, 2011 — Iran
- Spariolenus khoozestanus Zamani, 2016 — Iran
- Spariolenus manesht Moradmand & Jäger, 2011 — Iran
- Spariolenus mansourii Moradmand, 2017 — Iran
- Spariolenus secundus Jäger, 2006 — Oman
- Spariolenus taeniatus Thorell, 1890 — Indonesia (Sumatra)
- Spariolenus taprobanicus (Walckenaer, 1837) — Sri Lanka
- Spariolenus tigris Simon, 1880 (type) — India, Pakistan, Malaysia
- Spariolenus zagros Moradmand & Jäger, 2011 — Iran

=== Staianus ===
Staianus Simon, 1889 - Incertae Sedis

- Staianus acuminatus Simon, 1889 (type) — Madagascar

=== Stasina ===
Stasina Simon, 1877 - Sparianthinae

- Stasina americana Simon, 1887 — Brazil
- Stasina hirticeps Caporiacco, 1955 — Venezuela
- Stasina manicata Simon, 1897 — Gabon
- Stasina nalandica Karsch, 1892 — Sri Lanka
- Stasina paripes (Karsch, 1879) — Sri Lanka
- Stasina planithorax Simon, 1897 — Malaysia
- Stasina rangelensis Franganillo, 1935 — Cuba
- Stasina spinosa Simon, 1897 — Brazil
- Stasina vittata Simon, 1877 (type) — Philippines

=== Stasinoides ===
Stasinoides Berland, 1922 - Incertae Sedis

- Stasinoides aethiopica Berland, 1922 (type) — Ethiopia

=== Stipax ===
Stipax Simon, 1898 - Sparianthinae

- Stipax triangulifer Simon, 1898 (type) — Seychelles

=== Strandiellum ===
Strandiellum Kolosváry, 1934 - Incertae Sedis

- Strandiellum wilhelmshafeni Kolosváry, 1934 (type) — New Guinea

== T ==
=== Thelcticopis ===
Thelcticopis

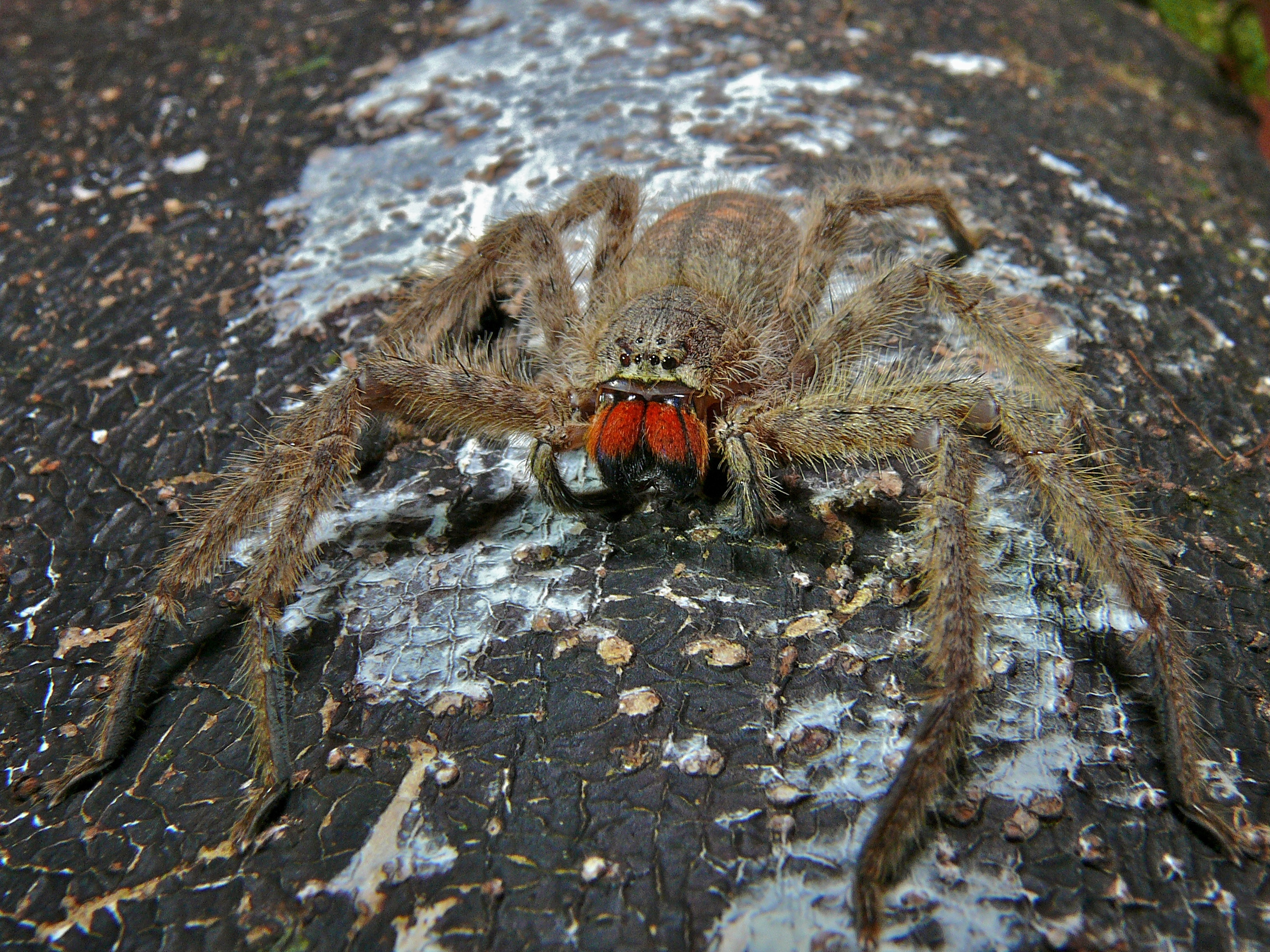
Thelcticopis orichalcea

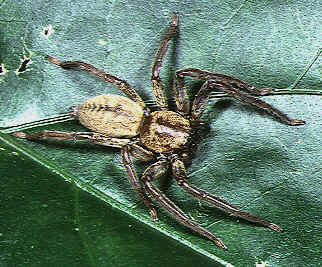
Thelcticopis severa, female

Thelcticopis Karsch, 1884 - Sparianthinae

- Thelcticopis ajax Pocock, 1901 — India
- Thelcticopis ancorum Dyal, 1935 — Pakistan
- Thelcticopis bicornuta Pocock, 1901 — India
- Thelcticopis bifasciata (Thorell, 1891) — India (Nicobar Is.)
- Thelcticopis biroi Kolosváry, 1934 — New Guinea
- Thelcticopis buu Logunov & Jäger, 2015 — Vietnam
- Thelcticopis canescens Simon, 1887 — India (Andaman Is.), Myanmar
- Thelcticopis celebesiana Merian, 1911 — Indonesia (Sulawesi)
- Thelcticopis convoluticola Strand, 1911 — Indonesia (Aru Is.)
- Thelcticopis cuneisignata Chrysanthus, 1965 — New Guinea
- Thelcticopis fasciata (Thorell, 1897) — Myanmar
- Thelcticopis flavipes Pocock, 1897 — Indonesia (Moluccas)
- Thelcticopis folia Jäger & Praxaysombath, 2009 — Laos
- Thelcticopis goramensis (Thorell, 1881) — Malaysia
- Thelcticopis hercules Pocock, 1901 — Sri Lanka
- Thelcticopis humilithorax (Simon, 1910) — Congo
- Thelcticopis huyoplata Barrion & Litsinger, 1995 — Philippines
- Thelcticopis insularis (Karsch, 1881) — Micronesia
- Thelcticopis kaparanganensis Barrion & Litsinger, 1995 — Philippines
- Thelcticopis karnyi Reimoser, 1929 — Indonesia (Sumatra)
- Thelcticopis kianganensis Barrion & Litsinger, 1995 — Philippines
- Thelcticopis kirankhalapi Ahmed, Sumukha, Khalap, Mohan & Jadhav, 2015 — India
- Thelcticopis klossi Reimoser, 1929 — Indonesia (Sumatra)
- Thelcticopis luctuosa (Doleschall, 1859) — Indonesia (Java)
- Thelcticopis maindroni Simon, 1906 — India
- Thelcticopis modesta Thorell, 1890 — Malaysia
- Thelcticopis moesta (Doleschall, 1859) — Indonesia (Ambon)
- Thelcticopis moolampilliensis Sunil Jose & Sebastian, 2007 — India
- Thelcticopis nigrocephala Merian, 1911 — Indonesia (Sulawesi)
- Thelcticopis ochracea Pocock, 1899 — Papua New Guinea (New Britain)
- Thelcticopis orichalcea (Simon, 1880) — Indonesia (Sumatra, Borneo)
- Thelcticopis papuana (Simon, 1880) — New Guinea
- Thelcticopis pennata (Simon, 1901) — Malaysia
- Thelcticopis picta (Thorell, 1887) — Myanmar
- Thelcticopis quadrimunita (Strand, 1911) — New Guinea
- Thelcticopis rubristernis Strand, 1911 — Indonesia (Aru Is.)
- Thelcticopis rufula Pocock, 1901 — India
- Thelcticopis sagittata (Hogg, 1915) — New Guinea
- Thelcticopis salomonum (Strand, 1913) — Solomon Is.
- Thelcticopis scaura (Simon, 1910) — São Tomé and Príncipe
- Thelcticopis serambiformis Strand, 1907 — India
- Thelcticopis severa (L. Koch, 1875) (type) — China, Laos, Korea, Japan
- Thelcticopis simplerta Barrion & Litsinger, 1995 — Philippines
- Thelcticopis telonotata Dyal, 1935 — Pakistan
- Thelcticopis truculenta Karsch, 1884 — São Tomé and Príncipe
- Thelcticopis vasta (L. Koch, 1873) — Fiji
- Thelcticopis virescens Pocock, 1901 — India
- Thelcticopis zhengi Liu, Li & Jäger, 2010 — China

=== Thomasettia ===
Thomasettia Hirst, 1911 -Sparianthinae

- Thomasettia seychellana Hirst, 1911 (type) — Seychelles

=== Thunberga ===
Thunberga Jäger, 2020 - Heteropodinae

- Thunberga greta Jäger, 2020 — Madagascar
- Thunberga malagassa Strand, 1907 — Madagascar
- Thunberga nossibeensis Strand, 1907 (type) — Madagascar
- Thunberga septifer Strand, 1908 — Madagascar

=== Tibellomma ===
Tibellomma Simon, 1903 - Incertae Sedis

- Tibellomma chazaliae (Simon, 1898) (type) — Venezuela

=== Tychicus ===
Tychicus Simon, 1880 - Incertae Sedis

- Tychicus erythrophthalmus Simon, 1897 — Philippines
- Tychicus gaymardi Simon, 1880 — Papua New Guinea (Bismarck Arch.)
- Tychicus genitalis Strand, 1911 — New Guinea
- Tychicus longipes (Walckenaer, 1837) (type) — Indonesia (Ambon)
- Tychicus rufoides Strand, 1911 — Admiralty Is.

=== Typostola ===
Typostola

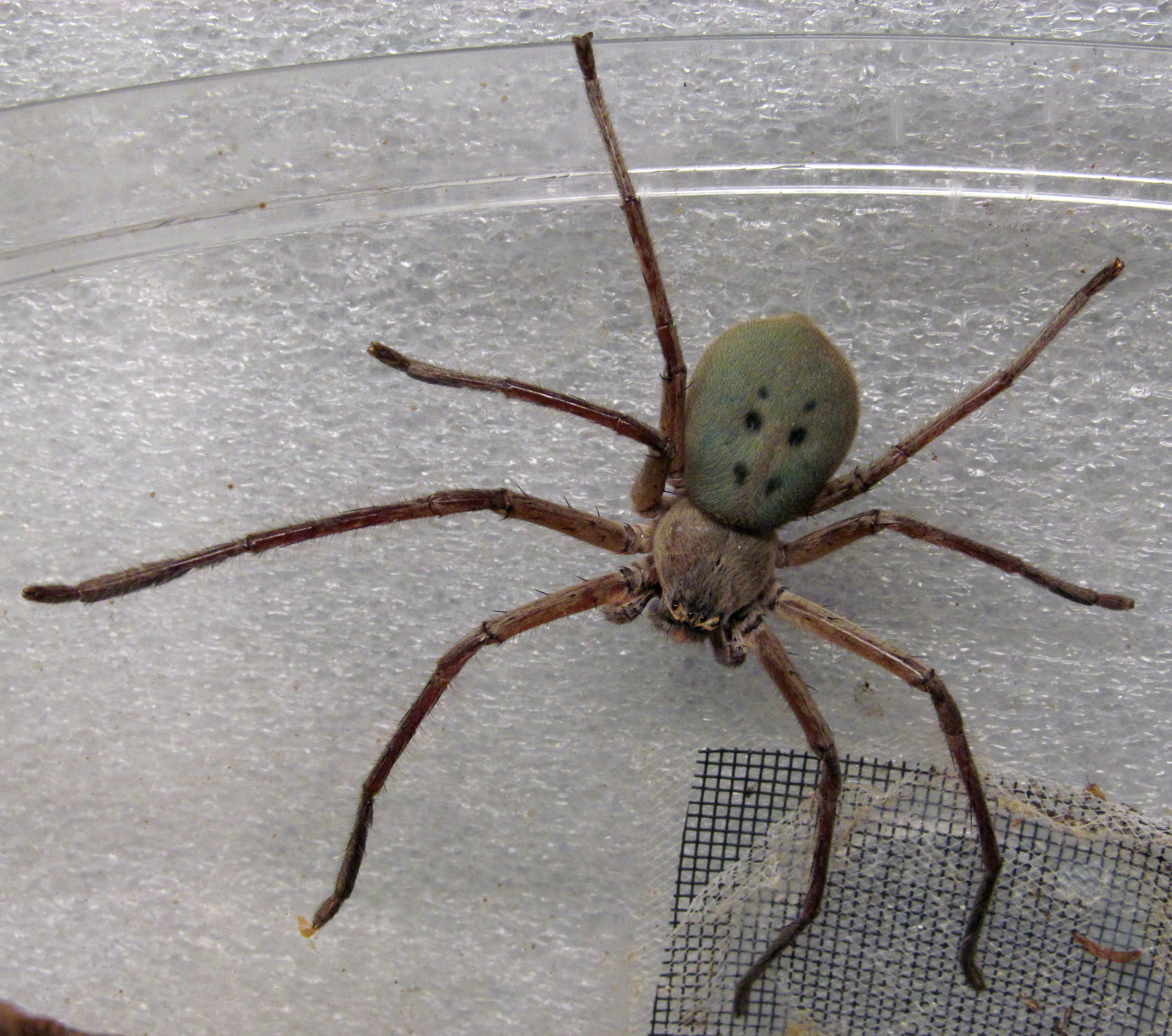
Typostola barbada

Typostola Simon, 1897 - Deleninae

- Typostola barbata (L. Koch, 1875) (type) — Australia (Queensland)
- Typostola heterochroma Hirst, 1999 — Australia (Queensland, New South Wales)
- Typostola pilbara Hirst, 1999 — Australia (Western Australia)
- Typostola tari Hirst, 1999 — New Guinea

== U ==
=== Uaiuara ===
Uaiuara Rheims, 2013 - Incertae Sedis

- Uaiuara amazonica (Simon, 1880) (type) — Northern South America
- Uaiuara barroana (Chamberlin, 1925) — Panama
- Uaiuara dianae Rheims, 2013 — Peru
- Uaiuara jirau Rheims, 2013 — Brazil
- Uaiuara ope Rheims, 2013 — Peru, Brazil
- Uaiuara palenque Rheims, 2013 — Ecuador
- Uaiuara quyguaba Rheims, 2013 — Brazil

== V ==
=== Vindullus ===
Vindullus Simon, 1880 - Sparassinae

- Vindullus angulatus Rheims & Jäger, 2008 — Peru, Ecuador, Brazil
- Vindullus concavus Rheims & Jäger, 2008 — Brazil
- Vindullus fugiens (O. Pickard-Cambridge, 1890) — Guatemala
- Vindullus gibbosus Rheims & Jäger, 2008 — Peru, Suriname
- Vindullus gracilipes (Taczanowski, 1872) (type) — French Guiana, Brazil
- Vindullus guatemalensis (Keyserling, 1887) — Guatemala
- Vindullus kratochvili Caporiacco, 1955 — Venezuela
- Vindullus undulatus Rheims & Jäger, 2008 — Colombia, Venezuela

== Y ==
=== Yiinthi ===
Yiinthi Davies, 1994 - Heteropodinae

- Yiinthi anzsesorum Davies, 1994 — Australia (Queensland)
- Yiinthi chillagoe Davies, 1994 — Australia (Queensland)
- Yiinthi gallonae Davies, 1994 — Australia (Queensland)
- Yiinthi kakadu Davies, 1994 — Australia (Western Australia, Northern Territory)
- Yiinthi lycodes (Thorell, 1881) — New Guinea, Australia (Queensland)
- Yiinthi molloyensis Davies, 1994 — Australia (Queensland)
- Yiinthi spathula Davies, 1994 (type) — Australia (Queensland)
- Yiinthi torresiana Davies, 1994 — Australia (Queensland)

== Z ==
=== Zachria ===
Zachria L. Koch, 1875 - Deleninae

- † Zachria desiderabilis Petrunkevitch, 1950 — Palaeogen Baltic amber
- Zachria flavicoma L. Koch, 1875 (type) — Australia (Western Australia)
- Zachria oblonga L. Koch, 1875 — Australia (New South Wales)
- † Zachria peculiata Petrunkevitch, 1946 — Palaeogen Baltic amber
- † Zachria restincta Petrunkevitch, 1958 — Palaeogen Baltic amber
