= David Hirst (arachnologist) =

Australian spider specialist

David B. Hirst
- Known for: Research on the family Sparassidae
- Scientific career
- Fields: Arachnology
- Workplaces: South Australian Museum
- Author abbrev. (zoology): Hirst

David B. Hirst is an Australian arachnologist formerly at the South Australian Museum in Adelaide. He left the Museum on 22 February 2011.

== Career ==
Hirst has described more than 40 species and genera in the huntsman spider family Sparassidae. He was regularly called on by New Zealand authorities to identify huntsman spiders that entered their country.

Hirst's work includes revision of many Sparassid genera including Delena, Holconia, Isopeda, Isopedella, Keilira, Pediana, Rhacocnemis, Thomasettia and Typostola.

Hirst has been a consultant in cases where spiders were said to have been found in bottles of wine from South Australia. The finders of the spiders were from the United Kingdom. In some cases he was able to rule out the bottles as the source of the spider because the specimens presented were not found in Australia. He however found a Clubiona sac spider more likely to have been in the bottle when filled because he was able to find the species present in wine growing areas.
