= Sampaiosia =

Scientific classification
- Kingdom: Animalia
- Phylum: Arthropoda
- Subphylum: Chelicerata
- Class: Arachnida
- Order: Araneae
- Infraorder: Araneomorphae
- Family: Sparassidae
- Genus: Sampaiosia; Mello-Leitão, 1930
- Species: S. crulsi

Binomial name
- Sampaiosia crulsi Mello-Leitão, 1930

Genus of spiders

Sampaiosia is a monotypic genus of Brazilian huntsman spiders containing the single species, Sampaiosia crulsi. It was first described by Cândido Firmino de Mello-Leitão in 1930, and is found in Brazil.

It has been synonymised with Sparianthis by Rheims in 2020.
