= Zachria =

Zachria Temporal range: Palaeogene– Present

Scientific classification
- Kingdom: Animalia
- Phylum: Arthropoda
- Subphylum: Chelicerata
- Class: Arachnida
- Order: Araneae
- Infraorder: Araneomorphae
- Family: Sparassidae
- Genus: Zachria; L. Koch, 1875

Type species
- Z. flavicoma L. Koch, 1875

Species
- Z. flavicoma L. Koch, 1875 – Australia (Western Australia); Z. oblonga L. Koch, 1875 – Australia (New South Wales)

Genus of spiders

Zachria is a genus of Australian huntsman spiders that was first described by Ludwig Carl Christian Koch in 1875. As of September 2019 it contains two species, found in New South Wales and Western Australia: Z. flavicoma and Z. oblonga. It is not a senior synonym of Eodelena.
