= Paenula paupercula =

Scientific classification
- Kingdom: Animalia
- Phylum: Arthropoda
- Subphylum: Chelicerata
- Class: Arachnida
- Order: Araneae
- Infraorder: Araneomorphae
- Family: Sparassidae
- Genus: Paenula; Simon, 1897
- Species: P. paupercula

Binomial name
- Paenula paupercula Simon, 1897

Genus of spiders

Paenula is a monotypic genus of Ecuadorian huntsman spiders containing the single species, Paenula paupercula. It was first described by Eugène Louis Simon in 1897, and is found in Ecuador.
