= Irileka =

Scientific classification
- Kingdom: Animalia
- Phylum: Arthropoda
- Subphylum: Chelicerata
- Class: Arachnida
- Order: Araneae
- Infraorder: Araneomorphae
- Family: Sparassidae
- Genus: Irileka; Hirst, 1998
- Species: I. iridescens

Binomial name
- Irileka iridescens Hirst, 1998

Genus of spiders

Irileka is a monotypic genus of Western Australian huntsman spiders containing the single species, Irileka iridescens. It was first described by David B. Hirst in 1998, and is found in Western Australia.
