= Tibellomma =

Scientific classification
- Kingdom: Animalia
- Phylum: Arthropoda
- Subphylum: Chelicerata
- Class: Arachnida
- Order: Araneae
- Infraorder: Araneomorphae
- Family: Sparassidae
- Genus: Tibellomma; Simon, 1903
- Species: T. chazaliae

Binomial name
- Tibellomma chazaliae (Simon, 1898)

Genus of spiders

Tibellomma is a monotypic genus of Venezuelan huntsman spiders containing the single species, Tibellomma chazaliae. It was first described by Eugène Louis Simon in 1903, and is found in Venezuela. The single species, T. chazaliae, was originally added to Prusias under the name Prusias chazaliae, and was moved to its own genus in 1903.
