= Dermochrosia =

Dermochrosia maculatissima

Scientific classification
- Kingdom: Animalia
- Phylum: Arthropoda
- Subphylum: Chelicerata
- Class: Arachnida
- Order: Araneae
- Infraorder: Araneomorphae
- Family: Sparassidae
- Genus: Dermochrosia; Mello-Leitão, 1940
- Species: D. maculatissima

Binomial name
- Dermochrosia maculatissima Mello-Leitão, 1940

Genus of spiders

Dermochrosia is a monotypic genus of huntsman spiders containing the single species, Dermochrosia maculatissima. It was first described by Cândido Firmino de Mello-Leitão in 1940, and is found in Brazil.
