= Tiomaniella =

Scientific classification
- Kingdom: Animalia
- Phylum: Arthropoda
- Subphylum: Chelicerata
- Class: Arachnida
- Order: Araneae
- Infraorder: Araneomorphae
- Family: Sparassidae
- Genus: Tiomaniella; Grall & Jäger, 2022
- Species: T. ladam

Binomial name
- Tiomaniella ladam Grall & Jäger, 2022

Species of spider

Tiomaniella is a monotypic genus of spiders in the family Sparassidae containing the single species, Tiomaniella ladam.

== Distribution ==
Tiomaniella ladam is endemic to Tioman Island, 32 km off the coast of Peninsular Malaysia.

== Etymology ==
The genus is named after Tioman Island. The species name is from Malay ladam#Malay "horseshoe", referring to the brown U-shaped patterning of the prosoma.
