= Defectrix =

Scientific classification
- Kingdom: Animalia
- Phylum: Arthropoda
- Subphylum: Chelicerata
- Class: Arachnida
- Order: Araneae
- Infraorder: Araneomorphae
- Family: Sparassidae
- Genus: Defectrix; Petrunkevitch, 1925
- Species: D. defectrix

Binomial name
- Defectrix defectrix Petrunkevitch, 1925

Genus of spiders

Defectrix is a monotypic genus of Panamanian huntsman spiders containing the single species, Defectrix defectrix. It was first described by Alexander Ivanovitch Petrunkevitch in 1925, and is found in Panama.
