= Deelemanikara =

Scientific classification
- Kingdom: Animalia
- Phylum: Arthropoda
- Subphylum: Chelicerata
- Class: Arachnida
- Order: Araneae
- Infraorder: Araneomorphae
- Family: Sparassidae
- Genus: Deelemanikara; Jäger, 2021
- Species: D. christae

Binomial name
- Deelemanikara christae Jäger, 2021

Genus of spiders

Deelemanikara is a monotypic genus of east African huntsman spiders containing the single species, Deelemanikara christae. It was first described by Peter Jäger in 2021, and it has only been found in Madagascar.
