= Damastes (spider) =

Scientific classification
- Kingdom: Animalia
- Phylum: Arthropoda
- Subphylum: Chelicerata
- Class: Arachnida
- Order: Araneae
- Infraorder: Araneomorphae
- Family: Sparassidae
- Genus: Damastes; Simon, 1880

Type species
- D. grandidieri Simon, 1880

Species
- 16, see text

Genus of spiders

Damastes is a genus of East African huntsman spiders that was first described by Eugène Louis Simon in 1880. It is classified under the family Sparassidae, though its subfamilial classification remains unclear. The subspecies Damastes coquereli affinis is a nomen dubium.

== Species ==
As of September 2019 it contains sixteen species, found on the Seychelles, in Mozambique, and on Madagascar:

- Damastes atrignathus Strand, 1908 – Madagascar
- Damastes coquereli Simon, 1880 – Madagascar
- Damastes decoratus (Simon, 1897) – Madagascar
- Damastes fasciolatus (Simon, 1903) – Madagascar
- Damastes flavomaculatus Simon, 1880 – Madagascar
- Damastes grandidieri Simon, 1880 (type) – Madagascar
- Damastes majungensis Strand, 1907 – Madagascar
- Damastes malagassus (Fage, 1926) – Madagascar
- Damastes malagasus (Karsch, 1881) – Madagascar
- Damastes masculinus Strand, 1908 – Madagascar
- Damastes nigrichelis (Strand, 1907) – Mozambique
- Damastes nossibeensis Strand, 1907 – Madagascar
- Damastes oswaldi Lenz, 1891 – Madagascar
- Damastes pallidus (Schenkel, 1937) – Madagascar
- Damastes sikoranus Strand, 1906 – Madagascar
- Damastes validus (Blackwall, 1877) – Seychelles

== Trapping prey ==
An unspecified Damastes species has been observed in the Sava Region of northeast Madagascar predating on vertebrates (frogs, Heterixalus andrakata). The same spider - and others of the same species - also build structures of leaves and silk and hide in the back of them. It is speculated that these are traps for catching these frogs.
