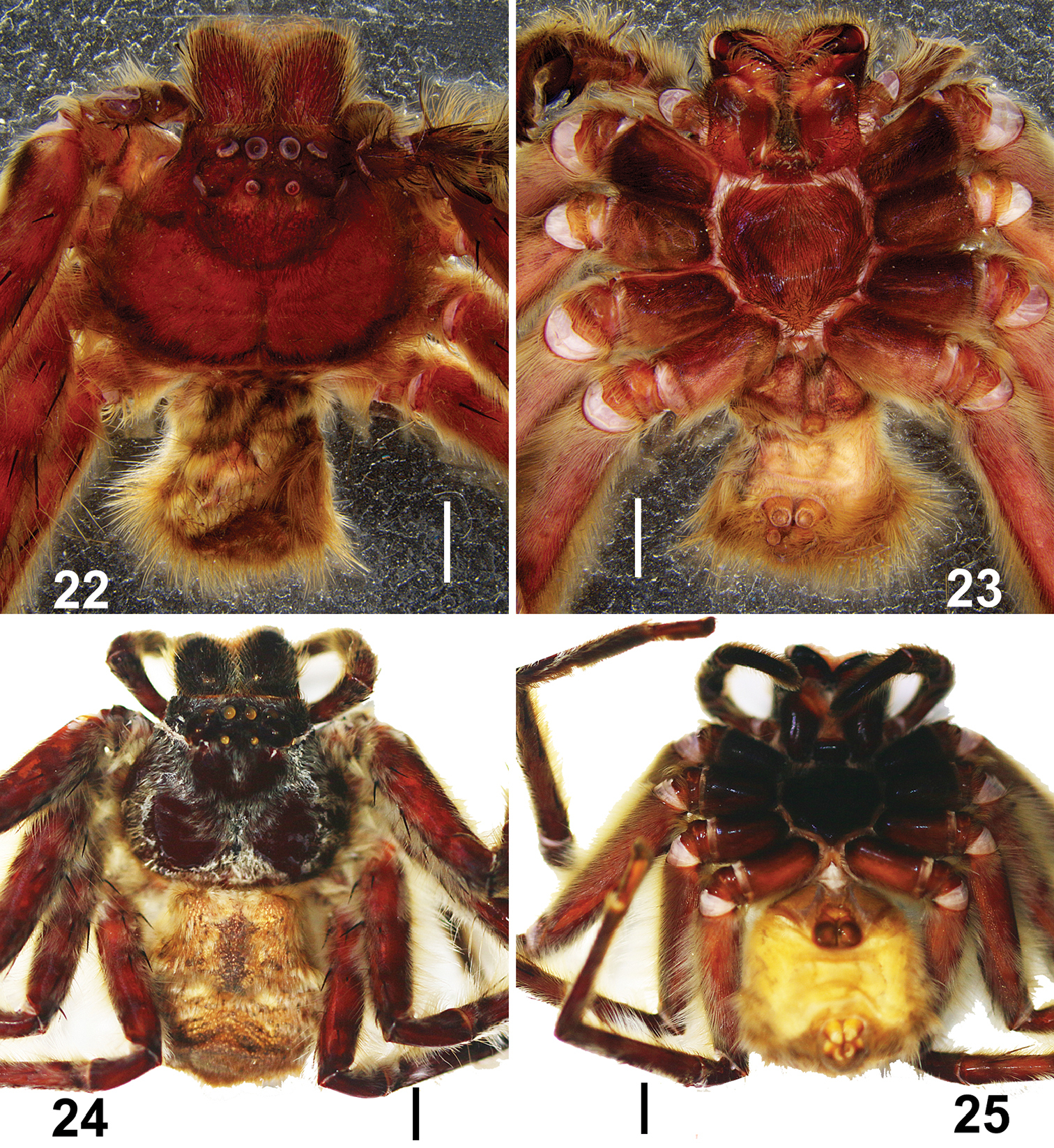

Scientific classification
- Kingdom: Animalia
- Phylum: Arthropoda
- Subphylum: Chelicerata
- Class: Arachnida
- Order: Araneae
- Infraorder: Araneomorphae
- Family: Sparassidae
- Genus: Barylestis; Simon, 1910

Type species
- B. blaisei (Simon, 1903)

Species
- 10, see text

= Barylestis =

Genus of spiders

Barylestis is a genus of huntsman spiders that was first described by Eugène Louis Simon in 1910.

== Species ==
As of May 2022 it contains ten species, all found in Africa, except B. saaristoi, from Thailand and Myanmar:

- Barylestis blaisei (Simon, 1903) (type) – Gabon
- Barylestis fagei (Lessert, 1929) – Congo, Rwanda
- Barylestis insularis Simon, 1910 – Equatorial Guinea (Bioko)
- Barylestis manni (Strand, 1906) – Nigeria - Nomen dubium
- Barylestis montandoni (Lessert, 1929) – Congo, Uganda
- Barylestis nigripectus Simon, 1910 – Congo
- Barylestis occidentalis (Simon, 1887) – Congo, Uganda, Sudan
- Barylestis peltatus (Strand, 1916) – Central Africa
- Barylestis saaristoi Jäger, 2008 – China, Thailand, Myanmar
- Barylestis scutatus (Pocock, 1903) – Cameroon
- Barylestis variatus (Pocock, 1900) – West Africa. Introduced to Northern Ireland, Britain, Belgium, Netherlands, Germany, Czech Rep.
