= Nolavia =

Scientific classification
- Kingdom: Animalia
- Phylum: Arthropoda
- Subphylum: Chelicerata
- Class: Arachnida
- Order: Araneae
- Infraorder: Araneomorphae
- Family: Sparassidae
- Genus: Nolavia; Kammerer, 2006

Species
- 7, see text

Genus of spiders

Nolavia is a genus of huntsman spiders containing 8 species. It was first described by C. F. Kammerer in 2006.

== Species ==
As of May 2022 it contains 7 species (and 1 subspecies).

- Nolavia antiguensis (Keyserling, 1880) – Caribbean
  - Nolavia antiguensis columbiensis (Schmidt, 1971) – Colombia. Introduced to Germany
- Nolavia audax (Banks, 1909) – Costa Rica
- Nolavia fuhrmanni (Strand, 1914) – US Virgin Is. (St. Thomas)
- Nolavia helva (Keyserling, 1880) – Colombia
- Nolavia rubriventris (Piza, 1939) – Brazil
- Nolavia stylifera (F. O. Pickard-Cambridge, 1900) – Mexico, Brazil
- Nolavia valenciae (Strand, 1916) – Venezuela
