= Thunberga =

Scientific classification
- Kingdom: Animalia
- Phylum: Arthropoda
- Subphylum: Chelicerata
- Class: Arachnida
- Order: Araneae
- Infraorder: Araneomorphae
- Family: Sparassidae
- Genus: Thunberga; Jäger, 2020

Type species
- Olios nossibeensis (Strand, 1907)

Species
- 29, see text

Genus of spiders

Thunberga is a genus of east African huntsman spiders. The genus was first described by Peter Jäger in 2020, and it has only been found on Madagascar and on Mayotte. It is named after the environmental activist Greta Thunberg.

== Species ==
As of April 2022 it contains twenty nine species:

- T. aliena Jäger, 2021 – Madagascar
- T. befotaka Jäger, 2021 – Madagascar
- T. boyanslat Jäger, 2021 – Madagascar
- T. cala Jäger, 2021 – Madagascar
- T. conductor Jäger, 2021 – Madagascar
- T. daraina Jäger, 2021 – Madagascar
- T. elongata Jäger, 2021 – Madagascar
- T. gosura Jäger, 2021 – Madagascar
- T. greta Jäger, 2020 – Madagascar
- T. jaervii Jäger, 2021 – Madagascar
- T. jyoti Jäger, 2021 – Madagascar
- T. mafira Jäger, 2021 – Madagascar
- T. malagassa (Strand, 1907) – Madagascar
- T. malala Jäger, 2021 – Madagascar
- T. mama Jäger, 2021 – Madagascar
- T. matoma Jäger, 2021 – Madagascar
- T. milloti Jäger, 2021 – Madagascar
- T. nossibeensis (Strand, 1907) (type) – Madagascar
- T. panusilem Jäger, 2021 – Madagascar
- T. paulyi Jäger, 2021 – Madagascar
- T. platnicki Jäger, 2021 – Madagascar
- T. rothorum Jäger, 2021 – Madagascar
- T. rugosa Jäger, 2021 – Madagascar
- T. samsagala Jäger, 2021 – Madagascar
- T. septifera (Strand, 1908) – Madagascar
- T. soruag Jäger, 2021 – Madagascar
- T. v-insignita Jäger, 2021 – Madagascar
- T. wasserthali Jäger, 2021 – Madagascar, Mayotte
- T. woodae Jäger, 2021 – Madagascar

== See also ==
- Olios
- Rhitymna
