= Clastes =

Scientific classification
- Kingdom: Animalia
- Phylum: Arthropoda
- Subphylum: Chelicerata
- Class: Arachnida
- Order: Araneae
- Infraorder: Araneomorphae
- Family: Sparassidae
- Genus: Clastes; Walckenaer, 1837
- Species: C. freycineti

Binomial name
- Clastes freycineti Walckenaer, 1837

Genus of spiders

Clastes is a monotypic genus of huntsman spiders containing the single species, Clastes freycineti. It was first described by Charles Athanase Walckenaer in 1837, and is found in Papua New Guinea and on the Moluccas.
