= Borniella =

Scientific classification
- Kingdom: Animalia
- Phylum: Arthropoda
- Subphylum: Chelicerata
- Class: Arachnida
- Order: Araneae
- Infraorder: Araneomorphae
- Family: Sparassidae
- Genus: Borniella; Grall & Jäger, 2022
- Species: B. parva

Binomial name
- Borniella parva Grall & Jäger, 2022

Species of spider

Borniella is a monotypic genus of spiders in the family Sparassidae containing the single species, Borniella parva.

== Distribution ==
Borniella parva has only been recorded from Borneo (Malaysia, Brunei).

== Etymology ==
The genus name refers to Borneo. The species name is Latin for "small", referring to the small body size.
