= Origes =

Scientific classification
- Kingdom: Animalia
- Phylum: Arthropoda
- Subphylum: Chelicerata
- Class: Arachnida
- Order: Araneae
- Infraorder: Araneomorphae
- Family: Sparassidae
- Genus: Origes; Simon, 1897

Type species
- O. pollens Simon, 1897

Species
- O. chloroticus Mello-Leitão, 1945; O. nigrovittatus (Keyserling, 1880); O. pollens Simon, 1897

Genus of spiders

Origes is a genus of South American huntsman spiders that was first described by Eugène Louis Simon in 1897. As of September 2019 it contains three species, found in Ecuador, Peru, and Argentina: O. chloroticus, O. nigrovittatus, and O. pollens. O. chloroticus may be misplaced in this genus and family.
