= Anchonastus =

Scientific classification
- Kingdom: Animalia
- Phylum: Arthropoda
- Subphylum: Chelicerata
- Class: Arachnida
- Order: Araneae
- Infraorder: Araneomorphae
- Family: Sparassidae
- Genus: Anchonastus; Simon, 1898

Type species
- A. caudatus Simon, 1898

Species
- 4, see text

Genus of spiders

Anchonastus is a genus of African huntsman spiders that was first described by Eugène Louis Simon in 1898.

== Species ==
As of September 2019 it contains four species, found in Africa:

- Anchonastus caudatus Simon, 1898 (type) – Cameroon
- Anchonastus gertschi Lessert, 1946 – Congo
- Anchonastus pilipodus (Strand, 1913) – Central Africa
- Anchonastus plumosus (Pocock, 1900) – West Africa
