= Uaica (spider) =

Scientific classification
- Kingdom: Animalia
- Phylum: Arthropoda
- Subphylum: Chelicerata
- Class: Arachnida
- Order: Araneae
- Infraorder: Araneomorphae
- Family: Sparassidae
- Genus: Uaica; Rheims, 2025

Type species
- U. uatuma Rheims, 2025

Species
- 5, see text

Genus of spiders

Uaica is a genus of spiders in the family Sparassidae.

== Distribution ==
The genus Uaica is endemic to Brazil.

== Species ==
As of January 2026, this genus includes five species:

- Uaica carapiranga Rheims, 2025 – Brazil
- Uaica juruena Rheims, 2025 – Brazil
- Uaica karipuna Rheims, 2025 – Brazil
- Uaica mapia Rheims, 2025 – Brazil
- Uaica uatuma Rheims, 2025 – Brazil
