= Martensopoda =

Scientific classification
- Kingdom: Animalia
- Phylum: Arthropoda
- Subphylum: Chelicerata
- Class: Arachnida
- Order: Araneae
- Infraorder: Araneomorphae
- Family: Sparassidae
- Genus: Martensopoda; Jäger, 2006

Type species
- M. transversa Jäger, 2006

Species
- Martensopoda minuscula (Reimoser, 1934); Martensopoda sanctor Sankaran, Malamel, Joseph & Sebastian, 2015; Martensopoda transversa Jäger, 2006

Genus of spiders

Martensopoda is a genus of Indian huntsman spiders that was first described by Peter Jäger in 2006. As of September 2019 it contains three species, found in India: M. minuscula, M. sanctor, and M. transversa.
