= Uaiuara =

Scientific classification
- Kingdom: Animalia
- Phylum: Arthropoda
- Subphylum: Chelicerata
- Class: Arachnida
- Order: Araneae
- Infraorder: Araneomorphae
- Family: Sparassidae
- Genus: Uaiuara; Rheims, 2013

Type species
- U. amazonica (Simon, 1880)

Species
- 7, see text

Genus of spiders

Uaiuara is a genus of huntsman spiders that was first described by C. Rheims in 2013.

== Species ==
As of September 2019 it contains seven species, found in South America and Panama:

- Uaiuara amazonica (Simon, 1880) (type) – Northern South America
- Uaiuara barroana (Chamberlin, 1925) – Panama
- Uaiuara dianae Rheims, 2013 – Peru
- Uaiuara jirau Rheims, 2013 – Brazil
- Uaiuara ope Rheims, 2013 – Peru, Brazil
- Uaiuara palenque Rheims, 2013 – Ecuador
- Uaiuara quyguaba Rheims, 2013 – Brazil
