= Microrchestris =

Scientific classification
- Kingdom: Animalia
- Phylum: Arthropoda
- Subphylum: Chelicerata
- Class: Arachnida
- Order: Araneae
- Infraorder: Araneomorphae
- Family: Sparassidae
- Genus: Microrchestris; Lawrence, 1962

Type species
- M. melanogaster Lawrence, 1962

Species
- M. melanogaster Lawrence, 1962 – Namibia; M. scutatus Lawrence, 1966 – Namibia

Genus of spiders

Microrchestris is a genus of Namibian huntsman spiders that was first described by R. F. Lawrence in 1962. As of September 2019 it contains two species, found in Namibia: M. melanogaster and M. scutatus.
