= Micropoda =

Scientific classification
- Kingdom: Animalia
- Phylum: Arthropoda
- Subphylum: Chelicerata
- Class: Arachnida
- Order: Araneae
- Infraorder: Araneomorphae
- Family: Sparassidae
- Genus: Micropoda; Grall & Jäger, 2022

Type species
- M. daviesae Grall & Jäger, 2022

Species
- 2, see text

Genus of spiders

Micropoda is a genus of spiders in the family Sparassidae.

Originally a monotypic genus, a second species was described in 2025.

== Distribution ==
Micropoda is endemic to Papua New Guinea.

== Species ==
As of January 2026, this genus includes two species:

- Micropoda bigyrus Hu, Chen & Liu, 2025 – Papua New Guinea
- Micropoda daviesae Grall & Jäger, 2022 – Papua New Guinea (New Britain)
