= Remmius =

Scientific classification
- Kingdom: Animalia
- Phylum: Arthropoda
- Subphylum: Chelicerata
- Class: Arachnida
- Order: Araneae
- Infraorder: Araneomorphae
- Family: Sparassidae
- Genus: Remmius; Simon, 1897

Type species
- R. vultuosus Simon, 1897

Species
- 5, see text

Genus of spiders

Remmius is a genus of African huntsman spiders that was first described by Eugène Louis Simon in 1897.

== Species ==
As of September 2019 it contains five species, found in Africa:

- Remmius badius Roewer, 1961 – Senegal
- Remmius praecalvus Simon, 1910 – Congo
- Remmius quadridentatus Simon, 1903 – Equatorial Guinea
- Remmius vulpinus Simon, 1897 – Cameroon, Congo
- Remmius vultuosus Simon, 1897 (type) – Cameroon, Congo
