= Stasinoides =

Scientific classification
- Kingdom: Animalia
- Phylum: Arthropoda
- Subphylum: Chelicerata
- Class: Arachnida
- Order: Araneae
- Infraorder: Araneomorphae
- Family: Sparassidae
- Genus: Stasinoides; Berland, 1922
- Species: S. aethiopica

Binomial name
- Stasinoides aethiopica Berland, 1922

Genus of spiders

Stasinoides is a monotypic genus of Ethiopian huntsman spiders containing the single species, Stasinoides aethiopica. It was first described by Lucien Berland in 1922, and is found in Ethiopia. It has only been recorded twice, and is probably misplaced in this family.
