= Geminia =

Scientific classification
- Kingdom: Animalia
- Phylum: Arthropoda
- Subphylum: Chelicerata
- Class: Arachnida
- Order: Araneae
- Infraorder: Araneomorphae
- Family: Sparassidae
- Genus: Geminia; Thorell, 1897
- Species: G. sulphurea

Binomial name
- Geminia sulphurea Thorell, 1897

Genus of spiders

Geminia is a monotypic genus of Burmese huntsman spiders containing the single species, Geminia sulphurea. It was first described by Tamerlan Thorell in 1897, and is found in Myanmar.
