= Berlandia =

Scientific classification
- Kingdom: Animalia
- Phylum: Arthropoda
- Subphylum: Chelicerata
- Class: Arachnida
- Order: Araneae
- Infraorder: Araneomorphae
- Family: Sparassidae
- Genus: Berlandia; Lessert, 1921

Type species
- B. longipes Lessert, 1921

Species
- B. longipes Lessert, 1921 – East Africa; B. tenebricola Simon & Fage, 1922 – East Africa

Synonyms
- Lessertiola Strand, 1929

Genus of spiders

Berlandia is a genus of East African huntsman spiders that was first described by R. de Lessert in 1921. As of January 2026 it contains two species, found in Africa: B. longipes and B. tenebricola.
