= Pleorotus =

Conservation status
- Extinct (IUCN 3.1)

Scientific classification
- Kingdom: Animalia
- Phylum: Arthropoda
- Subphylum: Chelicerata
- Class: Arachnida
- Order: Araneae
- Infraorder: Araneomorphae
- Family: Sparassidae
- Genus: †Pleorotus; Simon, 1898
- Species: †P. braueri

Binomial name
- †Pleorotus braueri Simon, 1898

Genus of spiders

Pleorotus was a monotypic genus of Seychelloise huntsman spiders containing the single species, Pleorotus braueri. It was first described by Eugène Louis Simon in 1898, and was endemic to the Seychelles. The description was based on a single male collected on Mahe Island in 1894, but none have been found in later collections, and it has been declared extinct.

== See also ==
- List of Sparassidae species
