= Stipax =

Conservation status
- Extinct (IUCN 3.1)

Scientific classification
- Kingdom: Animalia
- Phylum: Arthropoda
- Subphylum: Chelicerata
- Class: Arachnida
- Order: Araneae
- Infraorder: Araneomorphae
- Family: Sparassidae
- Genus: †Stipax; Simon, 1898
- Species: †S. triangulifer

Binomial name
- †Stipax triangulifer Simon, 1898

Extinct genus of spiders

Stipax is a genus of spiders in the family Sparassidae, with a single species, Stipax triangulifer, first described in 1898. The description was based on a male collected in 1894. No specimens have been found since and the species has been declared extinct. It was endemic to Mahe Island in the Seychelles.
