= Cuiambuca =

Scientific classification
- Kingdom: Animalia
- Phylum: Arthropoda
- Subphylum: Chelicerata
- Class: Arachnida
- Order: Araneae
- Infraorder: Araneomorphae
- Family: Sparassidae
- Subfamily: Sparianthinae
- Genus: Cuiambuca; Rheims, 2023

Type species
- C. vacabrava Rheims, 2023

Species
- 3, see text

Genus of spiders

Cuiambuca is a genus of spiders in the family Sparassidae.

== Distribution ==
Cuiambuca is known only from Brazil.

== Etymology ==
The genus name is from a Brazilian noun cuiambuca (originally from Tupi kuîmbuka) for a bowl made from gourd, referring to the shape of the vulva.

C. aratangi refers to the old name of the city Araçoiaba, Chã do Monte de Aratangi. C. borborema is named after the location of the Ecological Station of Murici, Planalto de Borborema. C. vacabrava is named after the Sítio Vaca Brava.

== Species ==
As of January 2026, this genus includes three species:

- Cuiambuca aratangi Rheims, 2023 – Brazil
- Cuiambuca borborema Rheims, 2023 – Brazil
- Cuiambuca vacabrava Rheims, 2023 – Brazil
