= Platnickopoda =

Scientific classification
- Kingdom: Animalia
- Phylum: Arthropoda
- Subphylum: Chelicerata
- Class: Arachnida
- Order: Araneae
- Infraorder: Araneomorphae
- Family: Sparassidae
- Genus: Platnickopoda; Jäger, 2020

Type species
- P. normani Jäger, 2020

Species
- Platnickopoda normani Jäger, 2020; Platnickopoda saccata (Järvi, 1912)

Genus of spiders

Platnickopoda is a small genus of east African huntsman spiders. It was first described by Peter Jäger in 2020, and it has only been found in Tanzania. As of April 2022 it contains only two species: P. normani and P. saccata.

== See also ==
- Rhitymna
