= Guadana =

Scientific classification
- Kingdom: Animalia
- Phylum: Arthropoda
- Subphylum: Chelicerata
- Class: Arachnida
- Order: Araneae
- Infraorder: Araneomorphae
- Family: Sparassidae
- Genus: Guadana; Rheims, 2010

Type species
- G. manauara Rheims, 2010

Species
- 12, see text

Genus of spiders

Guadana is a genus of South American huntsman spiders that was first described by C. A. Rheims in 2010.

== Species ==
As of November 2021 it contains twelve species, found in Ecuador, Peru, Brazil and French Guiana:

- Guadana alpahuayo Rheims, 2021 – Peru
- Guadana amendoim Rheims, 2021 – Peru
- Guadana arawak Rheims, 2021 – French Guiana
- Guadana manauara Rheims, 2010 (type) – Brazil
- Guadana mapia Rheims, 2021 – Brazil
- Guadana muirpinima Rheims, 2021 – Brazil
- Guadana neblina Rheims, 2010 – Brazil
- Guadana panguana Rheims, 2010 – Peru
- Guadana quillu Rheims, 2010 – Ecuador
- Guadana tambopata Rheims, 2010 – Peru
- Guadana ucayali Rheims, 2021 – Peru
- Guadana urucu Rheims, 2010 – Brazil
