= Neostasina =

Scientific classification
- Domain: Eukaryota
- Kingdom: Animalia
- Phylum: Arthropoda
- Subphylum: Chelicerata
- Class: Arachnida
- Order: Araneae
- Infraorder: Araneomorphae
- Family: Sparassidae
- Genus: Neostasina; Alayón

Species
- 34, see text

Genus of spiders

Neostasina is a genus of spiders in the family Sparassidae. It was first described in 2016 by Rheims & Alayón. As of 2022, it contains 34 species, all found in the Caribbean.

== Species ==
Neostasina comprises the following species:

- Neostasina aceitillar Rheims & Alayón, 2022 - Dominican Rep.
- Neostasina amalie Rheims & Alayón, 2016 - British Virgin Is.
- Neostasina antiguensis (Bryant, 1923) - Antigua and Barbuda (Antigua)
- Neostasina bani Rheims & Alayón, 2022 - Dominican Rep.
- Neostasina baoruco Rheims & Alayón, 2016 - Dominican Rep.
- Neostasina bermudezi Rheims & Alayón, 2016 - Dominican Rep.
- Neostasina bicolor (Banks, 1914) - Jamaica, Haiti, Dominican Rep., Puerto Rico
- Neostasina bryantae Rheims & Alayón, 2016 - Cuba
- Neostasina cachote Rheims & Alayón, 2016 - Dominican Rep.
- Neostasina croix Rheims & Alayón, 2016 - Virgin Is.
- Neostasina demaco Rheims & Alayón, 2022 - Dominican Rep.
- Neostasina elverde Rheims & Alayón, 2016 - Puerto Rico
- Neostasina granpiedra Rheims & Alayón, 2016 - Cuba
- Neostasina guanaboa Rheims & Alayón, 2016 - Jamaica
- Neostasina gunboat Rheims & Alayón, 2016 - Jamaica
- Neostasina iberia Rheims & Alayón, 2016 - Cuba
- Neostasina jamaicana Rheims & Alayón, 2016 - Jamaica
- Neostasina juanita Rheims & Alayón, 2022 - Puerto Rico
- Neostasina liguanea Rheims & Alayón, 2016 - Jamaica
- Neostasina lucasi (Bryant, 1940) - Cuba
- Neostasina lucea Rheims & Alayón, 2016 - Jamaica
- Neostasina macleayi (Bryant, 1940) - Cuba
- Neostasina maisi Rheims & Alayón, 2022 - Cuba
- Neostasina mammee Rheims & Alayón, 2016 - Jamaica
- Neostasina maroon Rheims & Alayón, 2016 - Jamaica
- Neostasina montegordo Rheims & Alayón, 2016 - Cuba
- Neostasina oualie Rheims & Alayón, 2016 - St. Kitts and Nevis (Nevis)
- Neostasina paraiso Rheims & Alayón, 2022 - Puerto Rico
- Neostasina saetosa (Bryant, 1948) - Dominican Rep., Puerto Rico, Virgin Is.
- Neostasina siempreverde Rheims & Alayón, 2016 - Cuba
- Neostasina taino Rheims & Alayón, 2016 - Dominican Rep., Puerto Rico
- Neostasina toronegro Rheims & Alayón, 2022 - Puerto Rico
- Neostasina turquino Rheims & Alayón, 2016 - Cuba
- Neostasina virginensis Rheims & Alayón, 2016 - Virgin Is.
