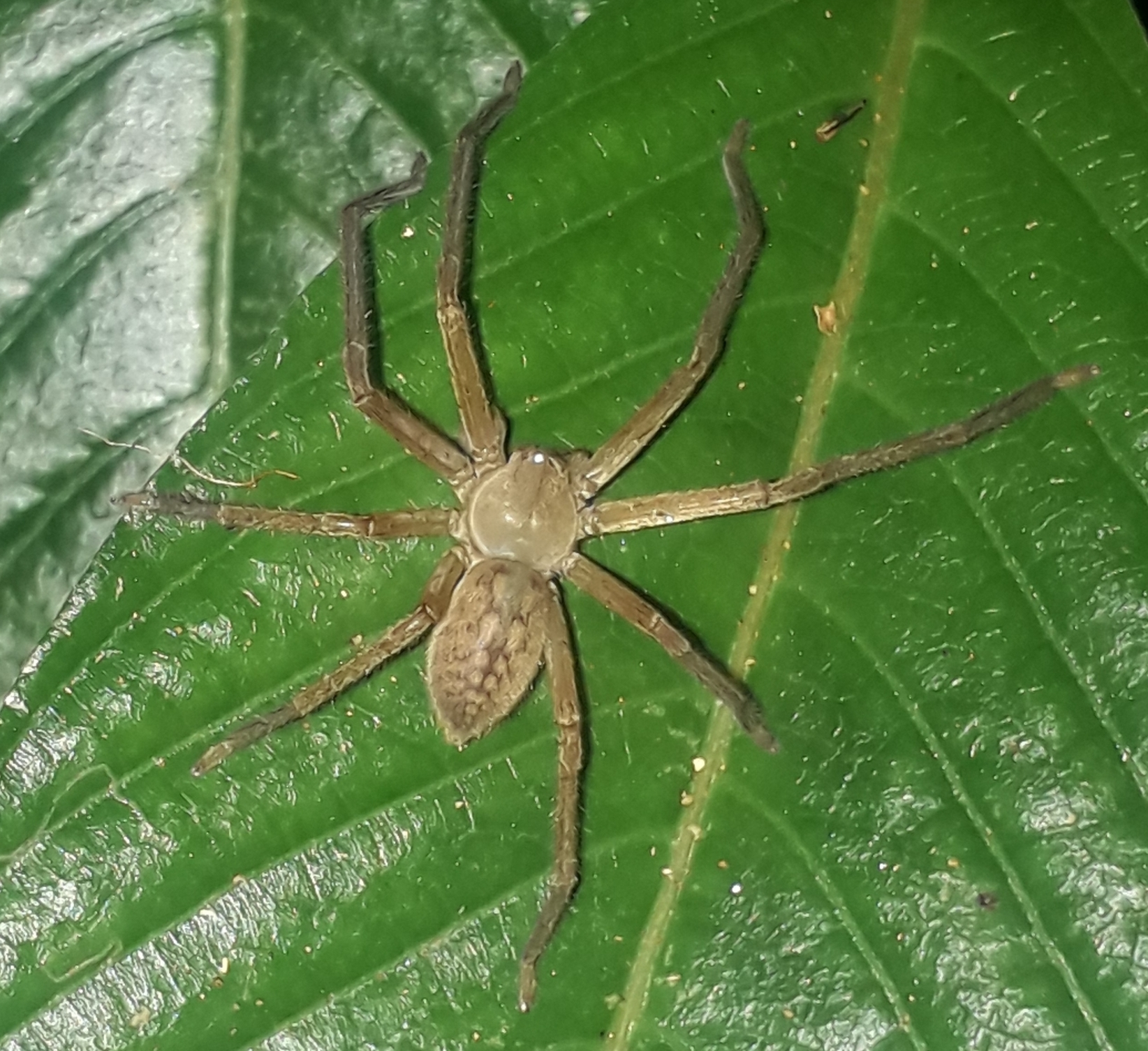
- M. martinique in Guadeloupe
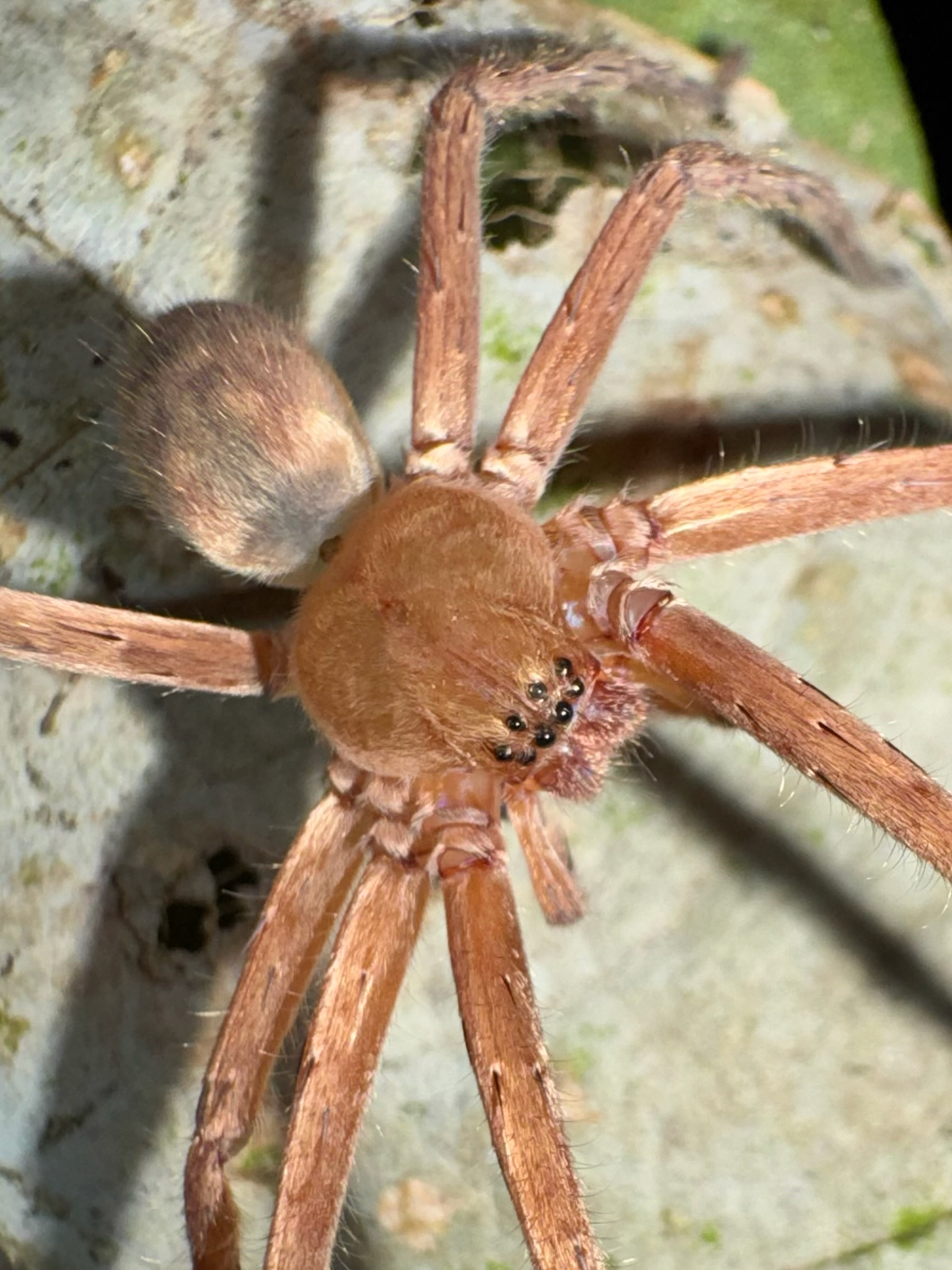
- M. martinique in Martinique

Scientific classification
- Kingdom: Animalia
- Phylum: Arthropoda
- Subphylum: Chelicerata
- Class: Arachnida
- Order: Araneae
- Infraorder: Araneomorphae
- Family: Sparassidae
- Genus: Meri; Rheims & Jäger, 2022

Type species
- Sadala pictitarsis Simon, 1880

Species
- 25, see text

= Meri (spider) =

Genus of spiders

Meri is a genus of spiders in the family Sparassidae.

== Distribution ==
Meri is distributed throughout northern South America and the Caribbean.

== Etymology ==
The genus is named after Bororó folk hero and sungod Meri. The last syllable is stressed.

== Species ==
As of January 2026, this genus includes 25 species:

- Meri abuna Rheims & Jäger, 2022 – Ecuador, Peru, Brazil
- Meri aparia Rheims & Jäger, 2022 – Peru
- Meri arraijan Rheims & Jäger, 2022 – Panama, Colombia
- Meri carabobo Rheims & Jäger, 2022 – Venezuela
- Meri conduri Rheims & Jäger, 2022 – Brazil
- Meri formosus (Banks, 1929) – Panama, Colombia
- Meri guri Rheims & Jäger, 2022 – Venezuela
- Meri jaraua Rheims & Jäger, 2022 – Venezuela, Suriname, French Guiana, Ecuador, Peru, Brazil
- Meri kaieteur Rheims & Jäger, 2022 – Venezuela, Guyana
- Meri manaos Rheims & Jäger, 2022 – French Guiana, Brazil
- Meri martinique Rheims & Jäger, 2022 – Guadelupe, Dominica, Martinique
- Meri mathani (Simon, 1880) – Ecuador, Peru
- Meri munduruku Rheims & Jäger, 2022 – Brazil
- Meri paiaia Rheims & Jäger, 2022 – Brazil
- Meri pictitarsis (Simon, 1880) – Brazil
- Meri quinari Rheims & Jäger, 2022 – Brazil
- Meri rivai Rheims & Jäger, 2022 – Brazil
- Meri sanctivincenti (Simon, 1898) – St. Vincent
- Meri tambor Rheims & Jäger, 2022 – Brazil
- Meri tapirapeco Rheims & Jäger, 2022 – Brazil
- Meri trinitatis (Strand, 1916) – Trinidad & Tobago, Venezuela, Guyana, Suriname, French Guiana, Brazil
- Meri tumatumari Rheims & Jäger, 2022 – Guyana
- Meri vanini Rheims & Jäger, 2022 – Peru, Brazil
- Meri yaciba Rheims & Jäger, 2022 – Venezuela
- Meri zeteki Rheims & Jäger, 2022 – Panama
