= Sparianthina =

Scientific classification
- Kingdom: Animalia
- Phylum: Arthropoda
- Subphylum: Chelicerata
- Class: Arachnida
- Order: Araneae
- Infraorder: Araneomorphae
- Family: Sparassidae
- Genus: Sparianthina; Banks, 1929

Type species
- S. selenopoides Banks, 1929

Species
- 11, see text

Genus of spiders

Sparianthina is a genus of huntsman spiders that was first described by Nathan Banks in 1929.

== Species ==
As of November 2021 it contains eleven species, found in Central America, Guyana, Colombia, Venezuela, and on Trinidad and Tobago:

- Sparianthina adisi Jäger, Rheims & Labarque, 2009 – Venezuela
- Sparianthina boyaca (Rheims, 2021) – Colombia
- Sparianthina deltshevi Jäger, Rheims & Labarque, 2009 – Venezuela
- Sparianthina gaita Rheims, 2011 – Venezuela
- Sparianthina milleri (Caporiacco, 1955) – Venezuela
- Sparianthina parang Rheims, 2011 – Trinidad and Tobago
- Sparianthina pumilla (Keyserling, 1880) – Colombia
- Sparianthina rufescens (Mello-Leitão, 1940) – Guyana
- Sparianthina saaristoi Jäger, Rheims & Labarque, 2009 – Venezuela
- Sparianthina selenopoides Banks, 1929 (type) – Costa Rica, Panama
- Sparianthina soca (Rheims, 2021) – Trinidad and Tobago
