= Diminutella =

Scientific classification
- Domain: Eukaryota
- Kingdom: Animalia
- Phylum: Arthropoda
- Subphylum: Chelicerata
- Class: Arachnida
- Order: Araneae
- Infraorder: Araneomorphae
- Family: Sparassidae
- Genus: Diminutella; Rheims & Alayón, 2018
- Species: D. cortina

Binomial name
- Diminutella cortina Rheims & Alayón, 2018

Genus of spiders

Diminutella is a genus of spiders in the family Sparassidae. It was first described in 2018 by Rheims and Alayón. It is a monotypic genus with one described species, Diminutella cortina. It is endemic to Pinar del Rio, Cuba.

== Etymology ==
The generic name Diminutella is from the Brazilian adjective diminuto and the suffix ella, referring to the minute size of the species. The specific name cortina is from Hacienda Cortina, where the species was found.

== Description ==
It is one of the smallest members of the subfamily Sparianthinae known to date, with a body length of 4.2–4.4 mm in the male. The male's prosoma (cephalothorax) is orange with pale brown margins. There are thin dark brown lines along the lateral margins of the cephalic region. The chelicerae, legs and palps are orange, the labium and sternum are pale yellow and the opisthosoma (abdomen) is creamy. The six spinnerets are yellowish cream colored. Eight eyes are arranged in two rows. The chelicerae have three promarginal (forward facing) teeth. The legs spread out sideways (i.e. are laterigrade).

The body length of the female is 3.5–4.4 mm. It is similar in coloration to the male with darker variations. The prosoma is brown with dark brown marks. The chelicerae are brown and the legs and palps pale brown. The labium is pale orange, and the sternum orange. The opisthosoma is yellowish cream. The six spinnerets are yellowish cream.
