= Nungara =

Scientific classification
- Kingdom: Animalia
- Phylum: Arthropoda
- Subphylum: Chelicerata
- Class: Arachnida
- Order: Araneae
- Infraorder: Araneomorphae
- Family: Sparassidae
- Genus: Nungara; Rheims{

Type species
- Nungara niveomaculata

Species
- Nungara anama Pinto & Rheims, 2016 – Brazil; Nungara cayana (Taczanowski, 1872) – Brazil, French Guiana; Nungara gaturama Pinto & Rheims, 2016 – Brazil; Nungara niveomaculata (Mello-Leitão, 1941) – Ecuador, Brazil

Genus of spiders

Nungara is a genus of spiders in the family Sparassidae. It was first described in 2016 by Pinto & Rheims. As of 2020, it contains four species from Ecuador, French Guiana and Brazil.
