= Sagellula =

Scientific classification
- Kingdom: Animalia
- Phylum: Arthropoda
- Subphylum: Chelicerata
- Class: Arachnida
- Order: Araneae
- Infraorder: Araneomorphae
- Family: Sparassidae
- Genus: Sagellula; Strand, 1942

Type species
- S. octomunita (Dönitz & Strand, 1906)

Species
- S. octomunita (Dönitz & Strand, 1906) – Japan; S. xizangensis (Hu, 2001) – China

Genus of spiders

Sagellula is a genus of east Asian huntsman spiders that was first described by Embrik Strand in 1942. It was originally described under the name "Sagella", but this was changed to Sagellula when a senior homonym was discovered. As of September 2019 it contains two species, found in China and Japan: S. octomunita and S. xizangensis.
