= Sivalicus =

Scientific classification
- Kingdom: Animalia
- Phylum: Arthropoda
- Subphylum: Chelicerata
- Class: Arachnida
- Order: Araneae
- Infraorder: Araneomorphae
- Family: Sparassidae
- Genus: Sivalicus; Dyal, 1957
- Species: S. viridis

Binomial name
- Sivalicus viridis Dyal, 1957

Genus of spiders

Sivalicus is a monotypic genus of Indian huntsman spiders containing the single species, Sivalicus viridis. It was first described by S. Dyal in 1957, and is found in India.
