= Sarotesius =

Scientific classification
- Kingdom: Animalia
- Phylum: Arthropoda
- Subphylum: Chelicerata
- Class: Arachnida
- Order: Araneae
- Infraorder: Araneomorphae
- Family: Sparassidae
- Genus: Sarotesius; Pocock, 1898
- Species: S. melanognathus

Binomial name
- Sarotesius melanognathus Pocock, 1898

Genus of spiders

Sarotesius is a monotypic genus of East African huntsman spiders containing the single species, Sarotesius melanognathus. It was first described by Reginald Innes Pocock in 1898, and is found in Africa.
