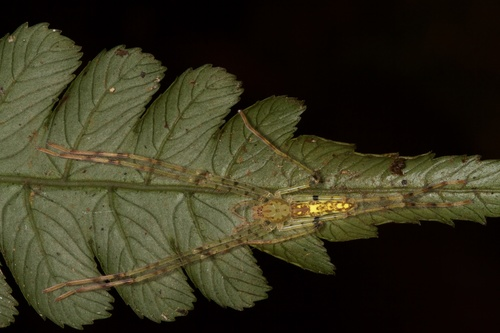
- Anaptomecus longiventris

Scientific classification
- Kingdom: Animalia
- Phylum: Arthropoda
- Subphylum: Chelicerata
- Class: Arachnida
- Order: Araneae
- Infraorder: Araneomorphae
- Family: Sparassidae
- Genus: Anaptomecus; Simon, 1903

Type species
- A. longiventris Simon, 1903

Species
- 6, see text

= Anaptomecus =

Genus of spiders

Anaptomecus is a genus of huntsman spiders that was first described by Eugène Louis Simon in 1903.

== Species ==
As of September 2019 it contains six species, found in Panama, Costa Rica, Ecuador, and Colombia:

- Anaptomecus levyi Jäger, Rheims & Labarque, 2009 – Colombia
- Anaptomecus longiventris Simon, 1903 (type) – Costa Rica, Panama, Ecuador
- Anaptomecus paru Guala, Labarque & Rheims, 2012 – Colombia, Ecuador
- Anaptomecus suni Guala, Labarque & Rheims, 2012 – Ecuador
- Anaptomecus temii Jäger, Rheims & Labarque, 2009 – Panama
- Anaptomecus yarigui Galvis & Rheims, 2018 – Colombia
