= Quemedice =

Scientific classification
- Kingdom: Animalia
- Phylum: Arthropoda
- Subphylum: Chelicerata
- Class: Arachnida
- Order: Araneae
- Infraorder: Araneomorphae
- Family: Sparassidae
- Genus: Quemedice; Mello-Leitão, 1942

Type species
- Q. enigmaticus Mello-Leitão, 1942

Species
- Q. enigmaticus Mello-Leitão, 1942 – Brazil, Argentina; Q. piracuruca Rheims, Labarque & Ramírez, 2008 – Colombia, Brazil

Genus of spiders

Quemedice is a genus of South American huntsman spiders that was first described by Cândido Firmino de Mello-Leitão in 1942. As of September 2019 it contains two species, found in Colombia, Argentina, and Brazil: Q. enigmaticus and Q. piracuruca. Originally placed with the Philodromidae, it was moved to the Sparassidae in 2008.
