= Bhutaniella =

Scientific classification
- Kingdom: Animalia
- Phylum: Arthropoda
- Subphylum: Chelicerata
- Class: Arachnida
- Order: Araneae
- Infraorder: Araneomorphae
- Family: Sparassidae
- Genus: Bhutaniella; Jäger, 2000

Type species
- B. hillyardi Jäger, 2000

Species
- 10, see text

Genus of spiders

Bhutaniella is a genus of Asian huntsman spiders that was first described by Peter Jäger in 2000.

== Species ==
As of September 2019 it contains ten species, found in Asia:

- Bhutaniella dunlopi Jäger, 2001 – Bhutan
- Bhutaniella gruberi Jäger, 2001 – Bhutan
- Bhutaniella haenggii Jäger, 2001 – Bhutan
- Bhutaniella hillyardi Jäger, 2000 (type) – Nepal
- Bhutaniella kronestedti Vedel & Jäger, 2005 – China
- Bhutaniella latissima Zhong & Liu, 2014 – Taiwan
- Bhutaniella rollardae Jäger, 2001 – Nepal
- Bhutaniella scharffi Vedel & Jäger, 2005 – China
- Bhutaniella sikkimensis (Gravely, 1931) – India
- Bhutaniella zhui Zhu & Zhang, 2011 – China
