= Exopalystes =

Scientific classification
- Kingdom: Animalia
- Phylum: Arthropoda
- Subphylum: Chelicerata
- Class: Arachnida
- Order: Araneae
- Infraorder: Araneomorphae
- Family: Sparassidae
- Genus: Exopalystes; Hogg, 1914
- Species: E. pulchellus

Binomial name
- Exopalystes pulchellus Hogg, 1914

Genus of spiders

Exopalystes is a monotypic genus of Papuan huntsman spiders containing the single species, Exopalystes pulchellus. It was first described by Henry Roughton Hogg in 1914, and is found in Papua New Guinea.
