= Caayguara =

Scientific classification
- Kingdom: Animalia
- Phylum: Arthropoda
- Subphylum: Chelicerata
- Class: Arachnida
- Order: Araneae
- Infraorder: Araneomorphae
- Family: Sparassidae
- Genus: Caayguara; Rheims, 2010

Type species
- C. album (Mello-Leitão, 1918)

Species
- 12, see text

Genus of spiders

Caayguara is a genus of Brazilian huntsman spiders that was first described by C. A. Rheims in 2010.

== Species ==
As of September 2019 it contains twelve species, found in Brazil:

- Caayguara ajuba Rheims, 2010 – Brazil
- Caayguara album (Mello-Leitão, 1918) (type) – Brazil
- Caayguara apiaba Rheims, 2010 – Brazil
- Caayguara atyaia Rheims, 2010 – Brazil
- Caayguara catuoca Rheims, 2010 – Brazil
- Caayguara cupepemassu Rheims, 2010 – Brazil
- Caayguara cupepemayri Rheims, 2010 – Brazil
- Caayguara itajucamussi Rheims, 2010 – Brazil
- Caayguara juati Rheims, 2010 – Brazil
- Caayguara pinda Rheims, 2010 – Brazil
- Caayguara poi Rheims, 2010 – Brazil
- Caayguara ybityriguara Rheims, 2010 – Brazil
