= Prychia =

Scientific classification
- Kingdom: Animalia
- Phylum: Arthropoda
- Subphylum: Chelicerata
- Class: Arachnida
- Order: Araneae
- Infraorder: Araneomorphae
- Family: Sparassidae
- Genus: Prychia; L. Koch, 1875

Type species
- P. gracilis L. Koch, 1875

Species
- 5, see text

Genus of spiders

Prychia is a genus of huntsman spiders that was first described by Ludwig Carl Christian Koch in 1875.

== Species ==
As of October 2020 it contains five species, found on Fiji, in Papua New Guinea, the Philippines, and on the Polynesian Islands:

- Prychia gracilis L. Koch, 1875 (type) – New Guinea to Fiji, Polynesia
- Prychia maculata Karsch, 1878 – New Guinea
- Prychia paalonga (Barrion & Litsinger, 1995) – Philippines (Mindanao)
- Prychia pallidula Strand, 1911 – New Guinea
- Prychia suavis Simon, 1897 – Philippines
