= Yiinthi =

Scientific classification
- Kingdom: Animalia
- Phylum: Arthropoda
- Subphylum: Chelicerata
- Class: Arachnida
- Order: Araneae
- Infraorder: Araneomorphae
- Family: Sparassidae
- Genus: Yiinthi; Davies, 1994

Type species
- Y. spathula Davies, 1994

Species
- 8, see text

Genus of spiders

Yiinthi is a genus of South Pacific huntsman spiders that was first described by V. T. Davies in 1994. Y. lycodes was transferred from Heteropoda.

== Species ==
As of September 2019 it contains eight species, found in Papua New Guinea and Australia:

- Yiinthi anzsesorum Davies, 1994 – Australia (Queensland)
- Yiinthi chillagoe Davies, 1994 – Australia (Queensland)
- Yiinthi gallonae Davies, 1994 – Australia (Queensland)
- Yiinthi kakadu Davies, 1994 – Australia (Western Australia, Northern Territory)
- Yiinthi lycodes (Thorell, 1881) – New Guinea, Australia (Queensland)
- Yiinthi molloyensis Davies, 1994 – Australia (Queensland)
- Yiinthi spathula Davies, 1994 (type) – Australia (Queensland)
- Yiinthi torresiana Davies, 1994 – Australia (Queensland)
