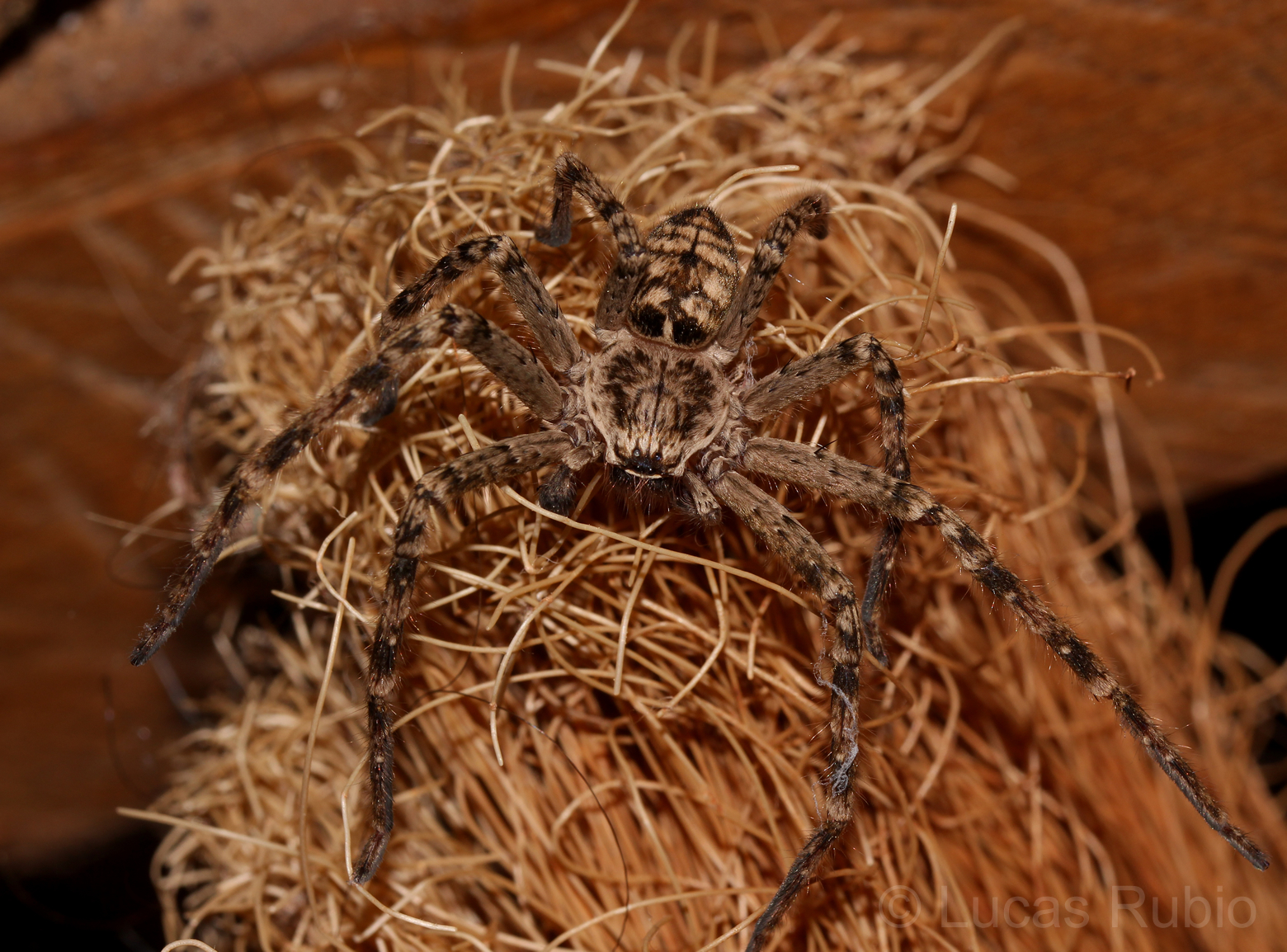
- Polybetes rapidus

Scientific classification
- Kingdom: Animalia
- Phylum: Arthropoda
- Subphylum: Chelicerata
- Class: Arachnida
- Order: Araneae
- Infraorder: Araneomorphae
- Family: Sparassidae
- Genus: Polybetes; Simon, 1897

Type species
- P. martius (Nicolet, 1849)

Species
- 15, see text

Synonyms
- Leptosparassus Järvi, 1914; Streptaedoea Järvi, 1914

= Polybetes =

Genus of spiders

Polybetes is a genus of South American huntsman spiders that was first described by Eugène Louis Simon in 1897. It is a senior synonym of Leptosparassus and Streptaedoea.

They are commonly found in tall grass and on the bark or branches of trees. At least two species have adapted to urban environments and have been found indoors. They are large and somewhat aggressive spiders, but their venom is not toxic enough to be dangerous to humans.

== Species ==
As of March 2022 it contains fifteen species, all endemic to South America:

- Polybetes bombilius (F. O. Pickard-Cambridge, 1899) – Peru
- Polybetes delfini Simon, 1904 – Chile
- Polybetes fasciatus (Keyserling, 1880) – Brazil, Peru
- Polybetes germaini Simon, 1897 – Brazil, Paraguay, Argentina
- Polybetes hyeroglyphicus (Mello-Leitão, 1918) – Brazil
- Polybetes martius (Nicolet, 1849) (type) – Chile, Argentina
- Polybetes obnuptus Simon, 1897 – Bolivia, Argentina
- Polybetes pallidus Mello-Leitão, 1941 – Argentina
- Polybetes parvus (Järvi, 1914) – Paraguay
- Polybetes punctulatus Mello-Leitão, 1944 – Argentina
- Polybetes pythagoricus (Holmberg, 1875) – Brazil, Guyana, Uruguay, Paraguay, Argentina
- Polybetes quadrifoveatus (Järvi, 1914) – Argentina
- Polybetes rapidus (Keyserling, 1880) – Suriname to Argentina
- Polybetes rubrosignatus Mello-Leitão, 1943 – Brazil
- Polybetes trifoveatus (Järvi, 1914) – Paraguay, Argentina
