= Chrosioderma =

Scientific classification
- Kingdom: Animalia
- Phylum: Arthropoda
- Subphylum: Chelicerata
- Class: Arachnida
- Order: Araneae
- Infraorder: Araneomorphae
- Family: Sparassidae
- Genus: Chrosioderma; Simon, 1897

Type species
- C. albidum Simon, 1897

Species
- 9, see text

Genus of spiders

Chrosioderma is a genus of Malagasy huntsman spiders that was first described by Eugène Louis Simon in 1897.

== Species ==
As of September 2019 it contains nine species, found on Madagascar:

- Chrosioderma albidum Simon, 1897 (type) – Madagascar
- Chrosioderma analalava Silva-Dávila, 2005 – Madagascar
- Chrosioderma havia Silva-Dávila, 2005 – Madagascar
- Chrosioderma mahavelona Silva-Dávila, 2005 – Madagascar
- Chrosioderma mipentinapentina Silva-Dávila, 2005 – Madagascar
- Chrosioderma namoroka Silva-Dávila, 2005 – Madagascar
- Chrosioderma ranomafana Silva-Dávila, 2005 – Madagascar
- Chrosioderma roaloha Silva-Dávila, 2005 – Madagascar
- Chrosioderma soalala Silva-Dávila, 2005 – Madagascar
