= Adcatomus =

Scientific classification
- Kingdom: Animalia
- Phylum: Arthropoda
- Subphylum: Chelicerata
- Class: Arachnida
- Order: Araneae
- Infraorder: Araneomorphae
- Family: Sparassidae
- Genus: Adcatomus; Karsch, 1880

Type species
- A. ciudadus Karsch, 1880

Species
- A. ciudadus Karsch, 1880 – Venezuela, Peru; A. flavovittatus (Simon, 1897) – Venezuela

Synonyms
- Spatala Simon, 1897

Genus of spiders

Adcatomus is a genus of South American huntsman spiders that was first described by Ferdinand Anton Franz Karsch in 1880. As of September 2019 it contains two species, found in Peru and Venezuela: A. ciudadus and A. flavovittatus.
