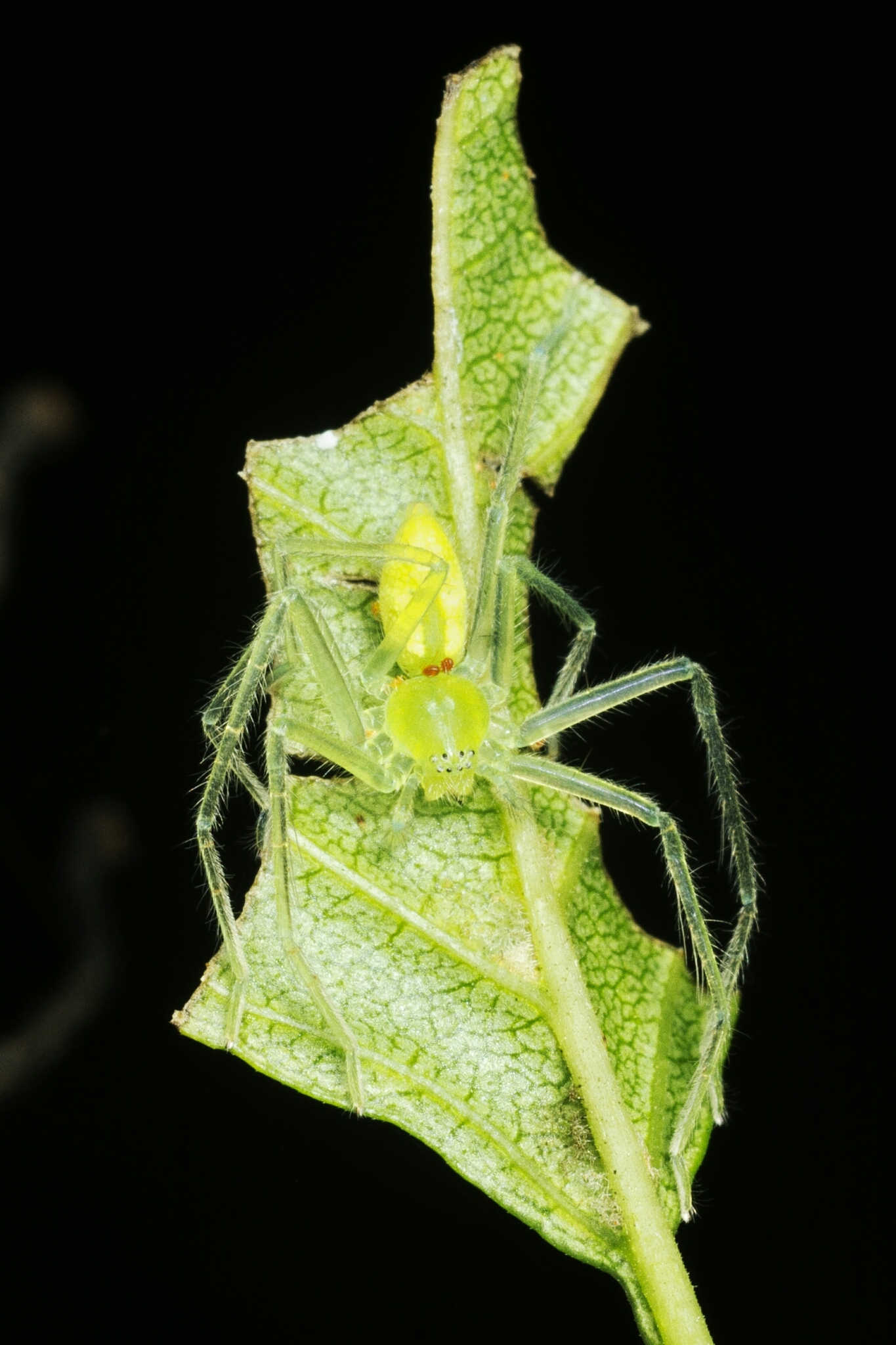
- Vindullus undulatus

Scientific classification
- Kingdom: Animalia
- Phylum: Arthropoda
- Subphylum: Chelicerata
- Class: Arachnida
- Order: Araneae
- Infraorder: Araneomorphae
- Family: Sparassidae
- Genus: Vindullus; Simon, 1880

Type species
- V. gracilipes (Taczanowski, 1872)

Species
- 8, see text

= Vindullus =

Genus of spiders

Vindullus is a genus of huntsman spiders erected by Eugène Louis Simon in 1880. Though often considered a synonym of Olios, it has been validated as its own genus.

== Species ==
As of September 2019 it contains eight species, found in South America and Guatemala:

- Vindullus angulatus Rheims & Jäger, 2008 – Peru, Ecuador, Brazil
- Vindullus concavus Rheims & Jäger, 2008 – Brazil
- Vindullus fugiens (O. Pickard-Cambridge, 1890) – Guatemala
- Vindullus gibbosus Rheims & Jäger, 2008 – Peru, Suriname
- Vindullus gracilipes (Taczanowski, 1872) (type) – French Guiana, Brazil
- Vindullus guatemalensis (Keyserling, 1887) – Guatemala
- Vindullus kratochvili Caporiacco, 1955 – Venezuela
- Vindullus undulatus Rheims & Jäger, 2008 – Colombia, Venezuela
