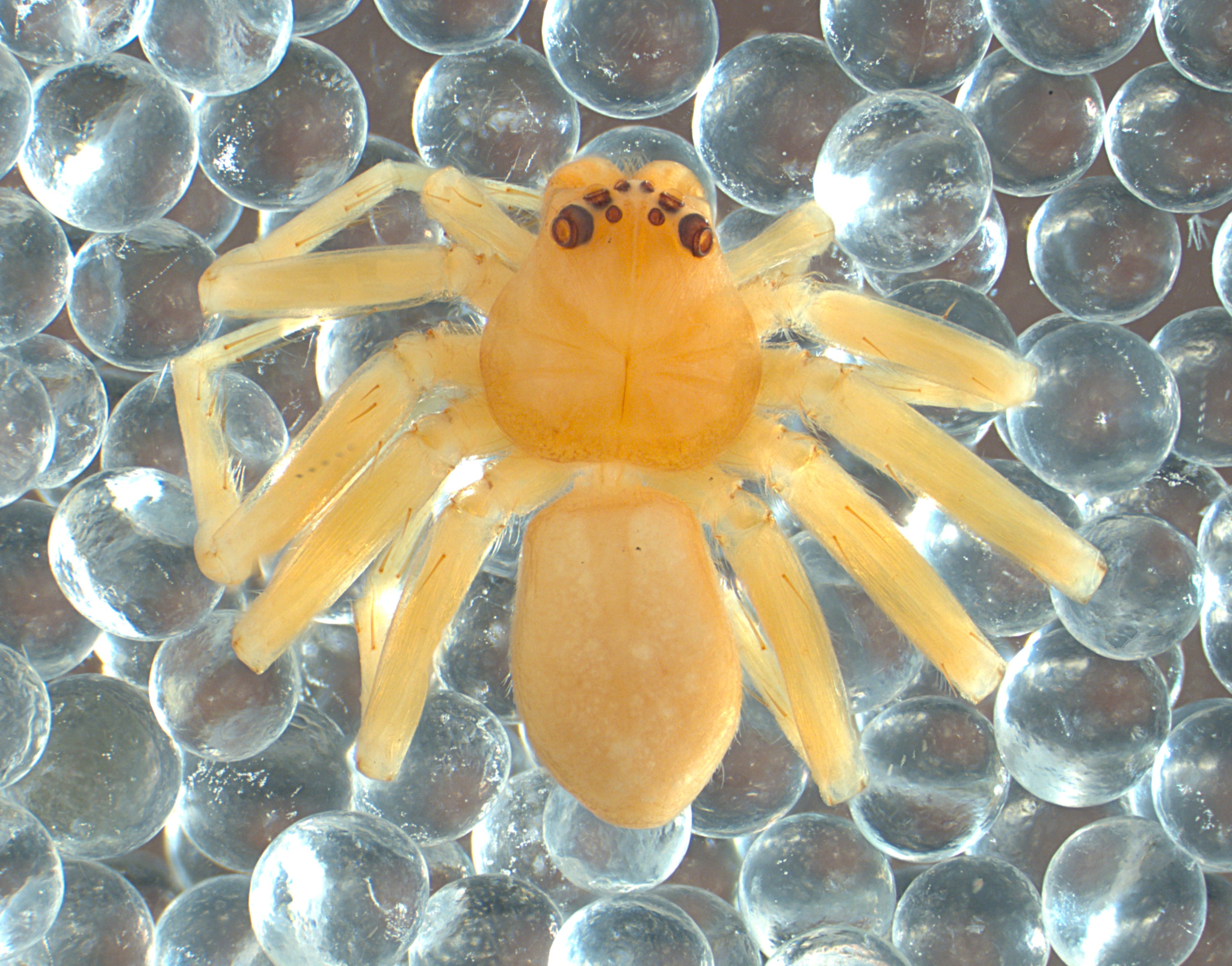
- female M. kecil from Sarawak

Scientific classification
- Kingdom: Animalia
- Phylum: Arthropoda
- Subphylum: Chelicerata
- Class: Arachnida
- Order: Araneae
- Infraorder: Araneomorphae
- Family: Sparassidae
- Genus: Menarik; Grall & Jäger, 2022
- Species: M. kecil

Binomial name
- Menarik kecil Grall & Jäger, 2022

= Menarik =

Species of spider

Menarik is a monotypic genus of spiders in the family Sparassidae containing the single species, Menarik kecil.

== Distribution ==
Menarik kecil has only been recorded from Malaysia (Borneo).

== Etymology ==
Genus and species names are from Malay menarik "attractive, interesting" and kecil "little".
