= Decaphora =

Scientific classification
- Kingdom: Animalia
- Phylum: Arthropoda
- Subphylum: Chelicerata
- Class: Arachnida
- Order: Araneae
- Infraorder: Araneomorphae
- Family: Sparassidae
- Genus: Decaphora; Franganillo, 1931

Type species
- D. cubana (Banks, 1909)

Species
- 5, see text

Synonyms
- Tentabunda Fox, 1937

Genus of spiders

Decaphora is a genus of huntsman spiders (family Sparassidae) which is found in tropical America. The genus was established by P. Franganillo-Balboa in 1931.

== Species ==
As of September 2019, it contained five species, found in Central America, Cuba, the Bahamas, Mexico, the United States, and Colombia:

- Decaphora cubana (Banks, 1909) (type) – USA, Bahamas, Cuba
- Decaphora kohunlich Rheims & Alayón, 2014 – Mexico, Guatemala
- Decaphora pestai (Reimoser, 1939) – Belize, Nicaragua, Costa Rica
- Decaphora planada Rheims, 2017 – Colombia
- Decaphora variabilis (F. O. Pickard-Cambridge, 1900) – Mexico
