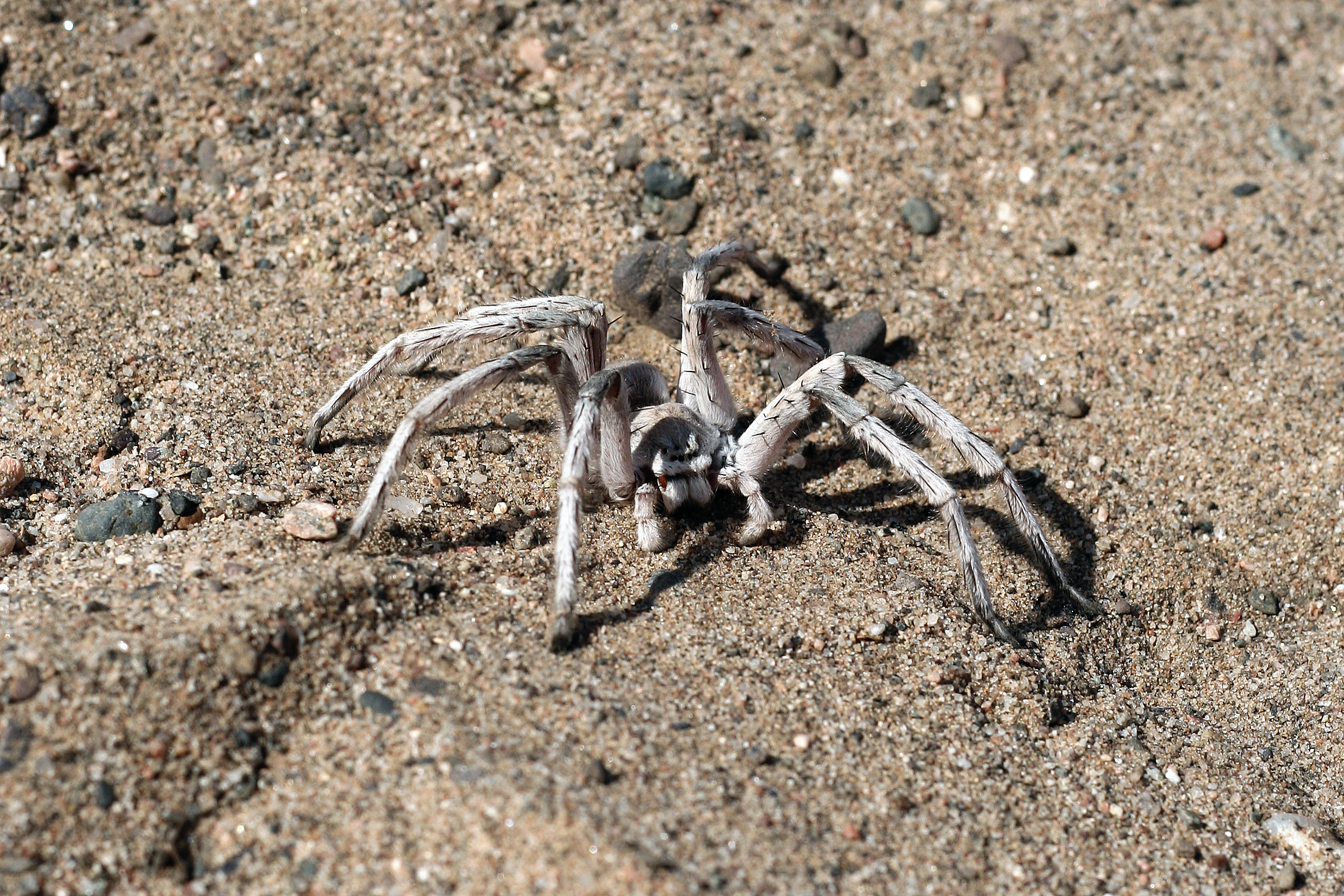

Scientific classification
- Kingdom: Animalia
- Phylum: Arthropoda
- Subphylum: Chelicerata
- Class: Arachnida
- Order: Araneae
- Infraorder: Araneomorphae
- Family: Sparassidae
- Genus: Orchestrella; Lawrence, 1965

Type species
- O. longipes Lawrence, 1965

Species
- O. caroli Lawrence, 1966 – Namibia; O. longipes Lawrence, 1965 – Namibia

= Orchestrella =

Genus of spiders

Orchestrella is a genus of Namibian huntsman spiders that was first described by R. F. Lawrence in 1965. As of September 2019 it contains two species, found in Namibia: O. caroli and O. longipes.
