= Papiri =

Scientific classification
- Kingdom: Animalia
- Phylum: Arthropoda
- Subphylum: Chelicerata
- Class: Arachnida
- Order: Araneae
- Infraorder: Araneomorphae
- Family: Sparassidae
- Subfamily: Sparianthinae
- Genus: Papiri; Rheims, 2025

Type species
- P. caete Rheims, 2025

Species
- 4, see text

Genus of spiders

Papiri is a genus of spiders in the family Sparassidae.

== Distribution ==
Papiri is only known from Brazil.

== Etymology ==
The genus is named after a Tupi-Guarani language word meaning "shelter", referring to the male palp sclerotized conductor that covers the tip of the embolus.

The species are named after "cabruca-cacau", a cacao cultivation system, Brazilian (borrowed from Tupi-Guarani) caeté "primeval forest", and "tacomare", a Tupi-Guarani word for a type of sugar cane.

== Species ==
As of January 2026, this genus includes four species:

- Papiri cabruca Rheims, 2025 – Brazil
- Papiri cacau Rheims, 2025 – Brazil
- Papiri caete Rheims, 2025 – Brazil
- Papiri tacomare Rheims, 2025 – Brazil
