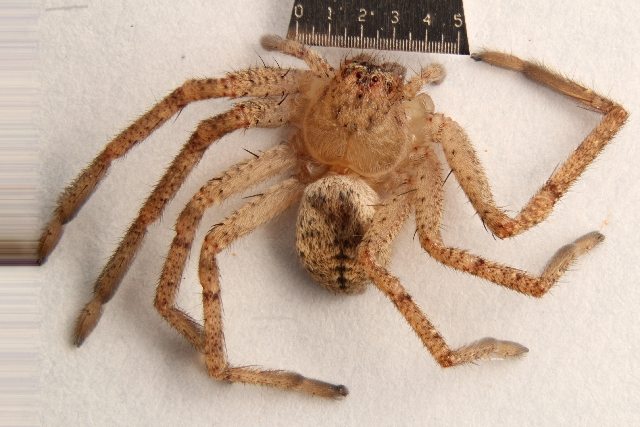
- C. peninsulanus

Scientific classification
- Kingdom: Animalia
- Phylum: Arthropoda
- Subphylum: Chelicerata
- Class: Arachnida
- Order: Araneae
- Infraorder: Araneomorphae
- Family: Sparassidae
- Genus: Curicaberis; Rheims, 2015

Type species
- C. ferrugineus (C. L. Koch, 1836)

Species
- 32, see text

= Curicaberis =

Genus of spiders

Curicaberis is a genus of huntsman spiders that was first described by C. A. Rheims in 2015. Species of this genus are found in North and Central America.

== Species ==
As of October 2019 it contains thirty-two species, found in Central America, Mexico, the United States, and Brazil:

- Curicaberis abnormis (Keyserling, 1884) – USA, Mexico
- Curicaberis annulatus (F. O. Pickard-Cambridge, 1900) – Mexico
- Curicaberis azul Rheims, 2015 – Mexico
- Curicaberis bagaces Rheims, 2015 – Costa Rica
- Curicaberis bibranchiatus (Fox, 1937) – USA, Mexico
- Curicaberis catarinas Rheims, 2015 – Mexico
- Curicaberis chamela Rheims, 2015 – Mexico
- Curicaberis chiapas Rheims, 2015 – Mexico, Guatemala
- Curicaberis culiacan Rheims, 2015 – Mexico
- Curicaberis cuyutlan Rheims, 2015 – Mexico
- Curicaberis durango Rheims, 2015 – Mexico
- Curicaberis eberhardi Rheims, 2015 – Mexico
- Curicaberis elpunto Rheims, 2015 – Mexico
- Curicaberis ensiger (F. O. Pickard-Cambridge, 1900) – Mexico
- Curicaberis ferrugineus (C. L. Koch, 1836) (type) – USA, Mexico, Guatemala, Brazil
- Curicaberis granada Rheims, 2015 – Nicaragua, Costa Rica
- Curicaberis huitiupan Rheims, 2015 – Mexico
- Curicaberis jalisco Rheims, 2015 – Mexico
- Curicaberis luctuosus (Banks, 1898) – Mexico
- Curicaberis manifestus (O. Pickard-Cambridge, 1890) – Mexico, Guatemala, Costa Rica
- Curicaberis minax (O. Pickard-Cambridge, 1896) – Mexico
- Curicaberis mitla Rheims, 2015 – Mexico
- Curicaberis pedregal Rheims, 2015 – Mexico
- Curicaberis peninsulanus (Banks, 1898) – USA, Mexico
- Curicaberis potosi Rheims, 2015 – Mexico
- Curicaberis puebla Rheims, 2015 – Mexico
- Curicaberis sanpedrito Rheims, 2015 – Mexico
- Curicaberis tepic Rheims, 2015 – Mexico
- Curicaberis tortugero Rheims, 2015 – Mexico
- Curicaberis urquizai Rheims, 2015 – Mexico
- Curicaberis yerba Rheims, 2015 – Mexico
- Curicaberis zapotec Rheims, 2015 – Mexico

In synonymy:

- C. albinus (Fox, 1937, T from Olios) = Curicaberis abnormis (Keyserling, 1884)
- C. naturalisticus (Chamberlin, 1924, T from Olios) = Curicaberis abnormis (Keyserling, 1884)
- C. positivus (Chamberlin, 1924, T from Olios) = Curicaberis peninsulanus (Banks, 1898)
- C. scepticus (Chamberlin, 1924, T from Olios) = Curicaberis peninsulanus (Banks, 1898)
- C. schistus (Chamberlin, 1919, T from Olios) = Curicaberis peninsulanus (Banks, 1898)
