= Sparianthis =

Scientific classification
- Kingdom: Animalia
- Phylum: Arthropoda
- Subphylum: Chelicerata
- Class: Arachnida
- Order: Araneae
- Infraorder: Araneomorphae
- Family: Sparassidae
- Genus: Sparianthis; Simon, 1880

Type species
- Sparianthis granadensis (Keyserling, 1880)

Species
- 13, see text

Genus of spiders

Sparianthis is a genus of huntsman spiders, first described by Eugène Louis Simon in 1880. They’re found in South America and Panama.

== Species ==
As of August 2024 it contains the following twenty species:

- Sparianthis accentuata (Caporiacco, 1955) — Venezuela
- Sparianthis beebei Rheims, 2020 — Trinidad and Tobago
- Sparianthis boibumba Casas & Rheims, 2024 — Brazil
- Sparianthis boraris Rheims, 2020 — Brazil
- Sparianthis caracarai Rheims, 2020 — Brazil
- Sparianthis cascalheira Casas & Rheims, 2024 — Brazil
- Sparianthis chicaque Casas & Rheims, 2024 — Colombia
- Sparianthis chickeringi (Gertsch, 1941) — Panama
- Sparianthis crulsi (Mello-Leitão, 1930) — Trinidad and Tobago, French Guiana, Brazil
- Sparianthis granadensis (Keyserling, 1880) — Colombia
- Sparianthis humaita Rheims, 2020 — Brazil
- Sparianthis iguaque Casas & Rheims, 2024 — Colombia
- Sparianthis juazeiro Rheims, 2020 — Brazil
- Sparianthis juruti Rheims, 2020 — Brazil
- Sparianthis matupiri Casas & Rheims, 2024 — Brazil
- Sparianthis medina Casas & Rheims, 2024 — Colombia
- Sparianthis megalopalpa (Caporiacco, 1954) — Ecuador, French Guiana
- Sparianthis picta (Simon, 1887) — Peru, Brazil
- Sparianthis ravida (Simon, 1898) — St. Vincent and the Grenadines, Guyana, Ecuador, Peru, Brazil
- Sparianthis tuparro Casas & Rheims, 2024 — Colombia
