= Prusias (spider) =

Scientific classification
- Kingdom: Animalia
- Phylum: Arthropoda
- Subphylum: Chelicerata
- Class: Arachnida
- Order: Araneae
- Infraorder: Araneomorphae
- Family: Sparassidae
- Genus: Prusias; O. Pickard-Cambridge, 1892

Type species
- P. nugalis O. Pickard-Cambridge, 1892

Species
- 4, see text

Genus of spiders

Prusias is a genus of huntsman spiders that was first described by Octavius Pickard-Cambridge in 1892.

== Species ==
As of January 2026, this genus includes four species:

- Prusias brasiliensis Mello-Leitão, 1915 – Brazil
- Prusias lanceolatus Simon, 1897 – Brazil, Peru
- Prusias nugalis O. Pickard-Cambridge, 1892 – Mexico, Panama
- Prusias semotus (O. Pickard-Cambridge, 1892) – Panama
