= Thomasettia =

Conservation status
- Extinct (IUCN 3.1)

Scientific classification
- Kingdom: Animalia
- Phylum: Arthropoda
- Subphylum: Chelicerata
- Class: Arachnida
- Order: Araneae
- Infraorder: Araneomorphae
- Family: Sparassidae
- Genus: †Thomasettia; Hirst, 1911
- Species: †T. seychellana

Binomial name
- †Thomasettia seychellana Hirst, 1911

Genus of spiders

Thomasettia is a genus of spiders in the family Sparassidae, with a single species, Thomasettia seychellana, first described in 1911. It has not been found since, and has been declared extinct. It was endemic to Mahe Island and Silhouette Island in the Seychelles.
