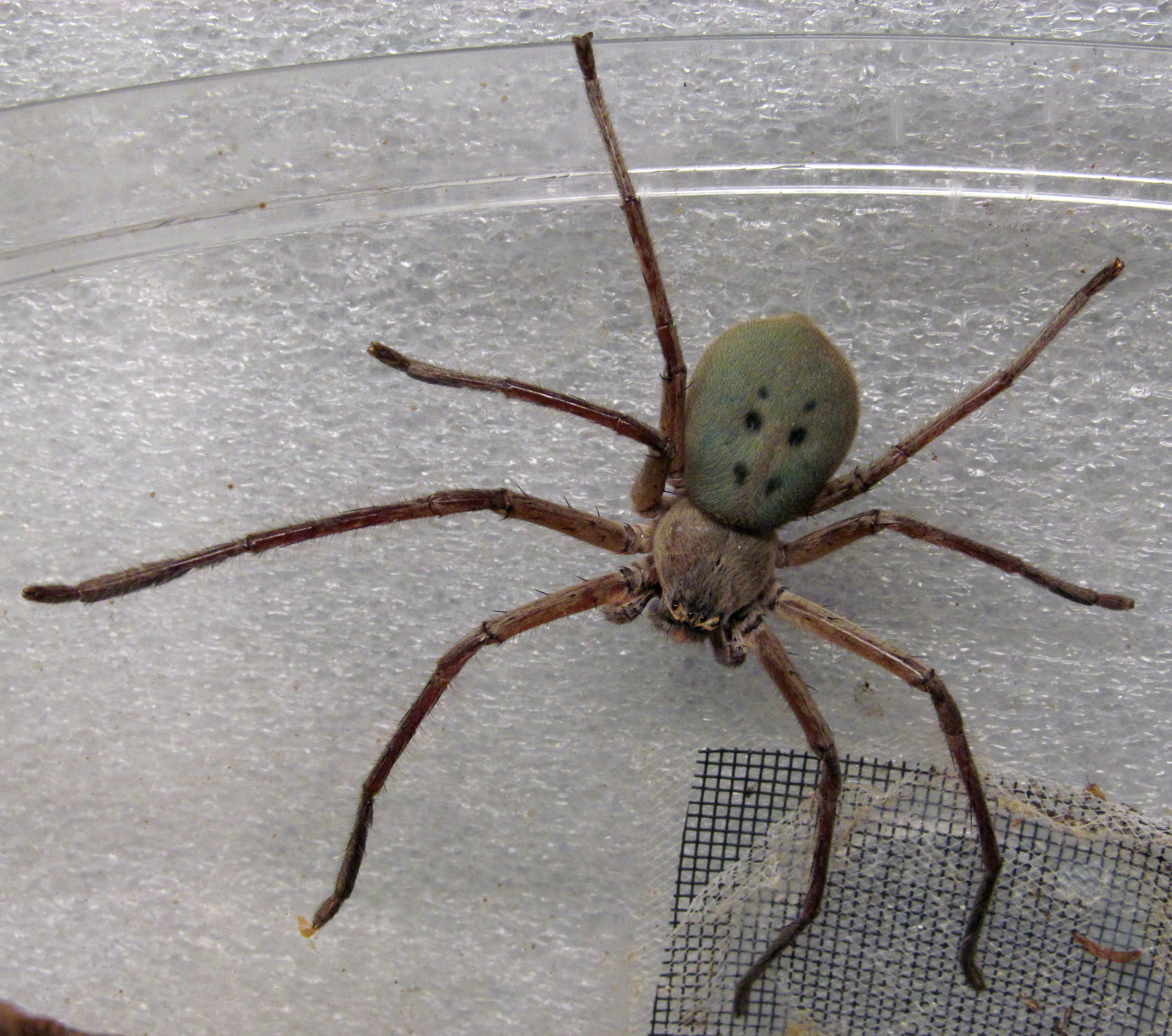
- T. barbata, female

Scientific classification
- Kingdom: Animalia
- Phylum: Arthropoda
- Subphylum: Chelicerata
- Class: Arachnida
- Order: Araneae
- Infraorder: Araneomorphae
- Family: Sparassidae
- Genus: Typostola; Simon, 1897

Type species
- T. barbata (L. Koch, 1875)

Species
- 4, see text

= Typostola =

Genus of spiders

Typostola is a genus of South Pacific huntsman spiders that was first described by Eugène Louis Simon in 1897.

== Species ==
As of September 2019 it contains four species, found in Papua New Guinea and Australia:

- Typostola barbata (L. Koch, 1875) (type) – Australia (Queensland)
- Typostola heterochroma Hirst, 1999 – Australia (Queensland, New South Wales)
- Typostola pilbara Hirst, 1999 – Australia (Western Australia)
- Typostola tari Hirst, 1999 – New Guinea
