= Rhacocnemis =

Scientific classification
- Kingdom: Animalia
- Phylum: Arthropoda
- Subphylum: Chelicerata
- Class: Arachnida
- Order: Araneae
- Infraorder: Araneomorphae
- Family: Sparassidae
- Genus: Rhacocnemis; Simon, 1897
- Species: R. guttatus

Binomial name
- Rhacocnemis guttatus (Blackwall, 1877)

Synonyms
- Rhacocnemis elegans Hirst, 1911; Sparassus guttatus Blackwall, 1877

Genus of spiders

Rhacocnemis is a monotypic genus of Seychelloise huntsman spiders containing the single species, Rhacocnemis guttatus. It was first described by Eugène Louis Simon in 1897, and is endemic to the Seychelles.
