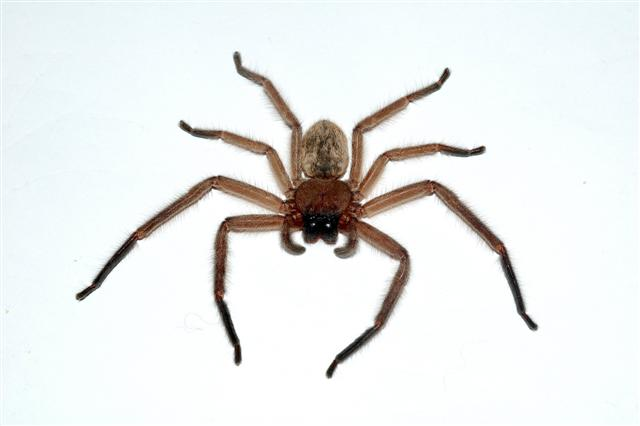
- Delena cancerides (female)

Scientific classification
- Kingdom: Animalia
- Phylum: Arthropoda
- Subphylum: Chelicerata
- Class: Arachnida
- Order: Araneae
- Infraorder: Araneomorphae
- Family: Sparassidae
- Genus: Delena; Walckenaer, 1837

Type species
- D. cancerides Walckenaer, 1837

Species
- 11, see text

Synonyms
- Eodelena Hogg, 1903

= Delena =

Genus of spiders

Delena is a genus of South Pacific huntsman spiders that was first described by Charles Athanase Walckenaer in 1837.

== Species ==
As of September 2019 it contains eleven species, found in New Zealand and Australia:

- Delena cancerides Walckenaer, 1837 (type) – Australia, Tasmania, New Zealand
- Delena convexa (Hirst, 1991) – Australia (Western Australia)
- Delena craboides Walckenaer, 1837 – Australia
- Delena gloriosa (Rainbow, 1917) – Australia (South Australia)
- Delena kosciuskoensis (Hirst, 1991) – Australia (New South Wales)
- Delena lapidicola (Hirst, 1991) – Australia (Western Australia)
- Delena loftiensis (Hirst, 1991) – Australia (South Australia)
- Delena melanochelis (Strand, 1913) – Australia (Victoria)
- Delena nigrifrons (Simon, 1908) – Australia (Western Australia)
- Delena spenceri (Hogg, 1903) – Australia (Tasmania, King Is.)
- Delena tasmaniensis (Hirst, 1991) – Australia (Tasmania)
