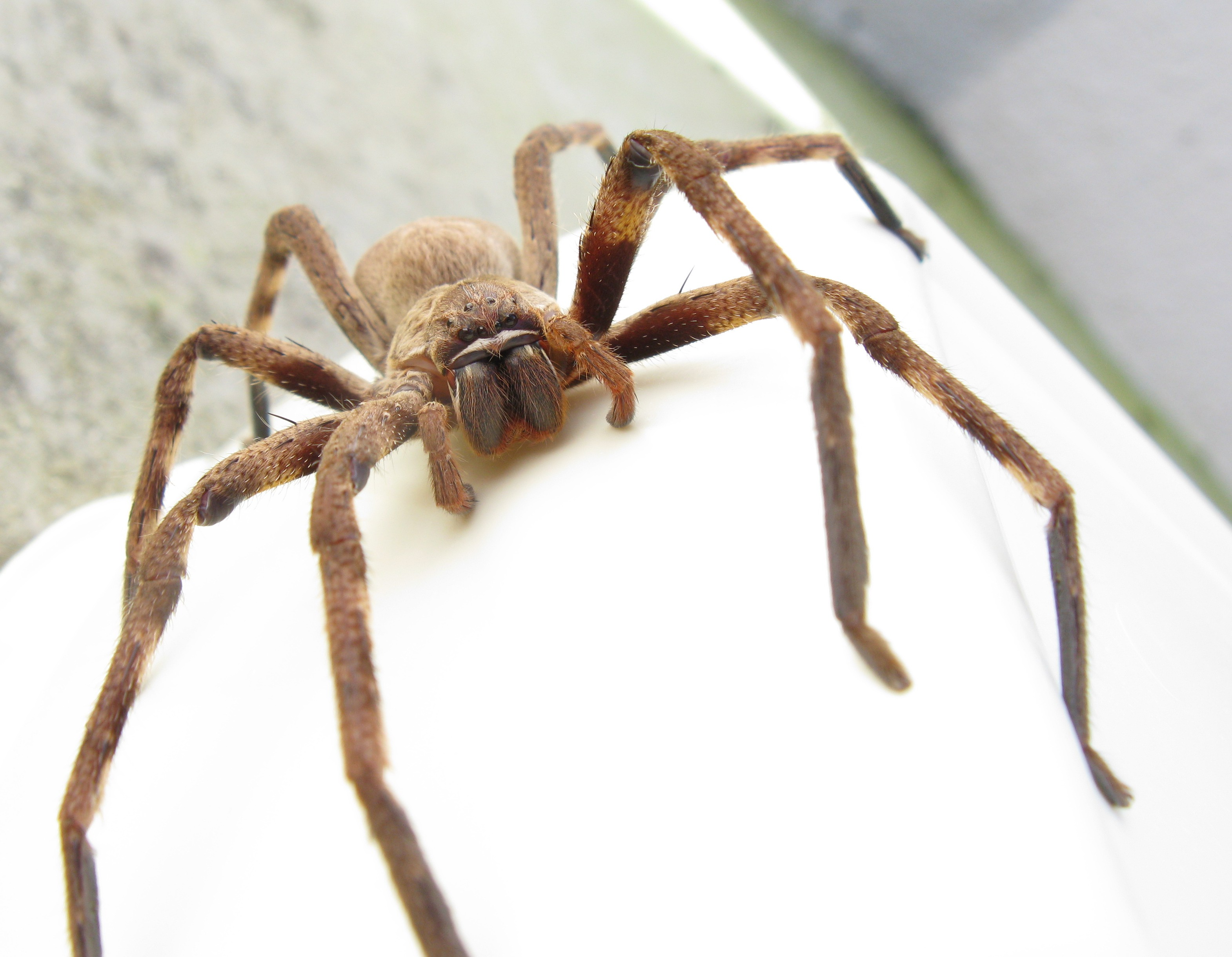
- Palystes castaneus, showing sparassid pattern of eyes in two rows of four, with the robust build and non-clavate pedipalps of a female
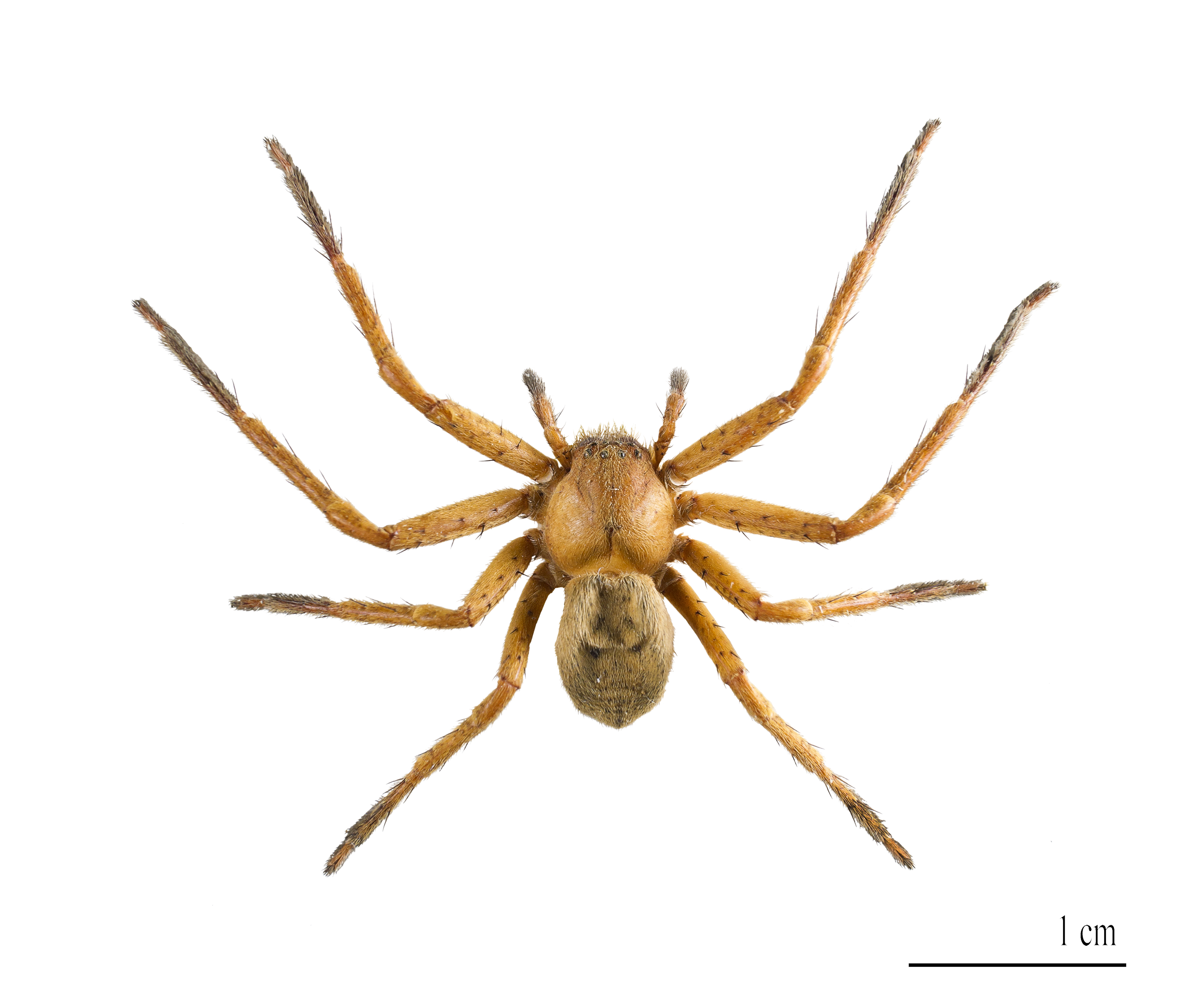
- Olios argelasius

Scientific classification
- Kingdom: Animalia
- Phylum: Arthropoda
- Subphylum: Chelicerata
- Class: Arachnida
- Order: Araneae
- Infraorder: Araneomorphae
- Family: Sparassidae; Bertkau, 1872

Diversity
- 99 genera, 1,550 species
- blue: reported countries (WSC) green: observation hotspots (iNaturalist)

= Huntsman spider =

Huntsman spiders Temporal range: Palaeogene–present

Family of spiders (Sparassidae)

Huntsman spiders, members of the family Sparassidae (formerly Heteropodidae), catch their prey by hunting rather than in webs. They are also called giant crab spiders because of their size and appearance. Larger species sometimes are referred to as wood spiders, because of their preference for woody places (forests, mine shafts, woodpiles, and wooden shacks). In southern Africa, the species of the genus Palystes are known as rain spiders or lizard-eating spiders. They are commonly confused with baboon spiders from the Mygalomorphae infraorder, which are not closely related.

More than a thousand Sparassidae species occur in most warm, temperate to tropical regions of the world, including much of Australia, Africa, Asia, the Mediterranean Basin, and the Americas.

Several species of huntsman spiders can use an unusual form of locomotion. The wheel spider (Carparachne aureoflava) from the Namib uses a cartwheeling motion, which gives it its name, while Cebrennus rechenbergi uses a handspring motion.

== Distribution ==
Members of the Sparassidae are native to tropical and warm, temperate regions worldwide. A few species are native to colder climates, such as the green huntsman spider (Micrommata virescens), which is native to Northern and Central Europe. Some tropical species such as Heteropoda venatoria (cane huntsman) and Delena cancerides (social huntsman) have been accidentally introduced to many subtropical parts of the world, including New Zealand (which has no native sparassid species).

== Description ==
Sparassids are eight-eyed spiders. The eyes appear in two, largely forward-facing rows of four on the anterior aspect of the prosoma. Many species grow very large – in Laos, male giant huntsman spiders (Heteropoda maxima) attain a leg span of 25–30 cm (9.8–11.8 in).

People unfamiliar with spider taxonomy commonly confuse large species with tarantulas, but huntsman spiders can generally be identified by their legs, which rather than being jointed vertically relative to the body, are twisted in such a way that in some altitudes, the legs extend forward in a crab-like fashion. They are also commonly confused for a brown recluse spider due to their shared coloring, but brown recluse venom is significantly dangerous to humans, while that of the huntsman spider is less so.

On their upper surfaces, the main colours of huntsman spiders are inconspicuous shades of brown or grey, but many species have undersides more or less aposematically marked in black and white. Their legs bear fairly prominent spines, but the rest of their bodies are smoothly furry. They tend to live under rocks, bark, and similar shelters, but human encounters are common in sheds, garages, and other infrequently disturbed places. The banded huntsman (Holconia) is large, grey to brown, with striped bands on its legs. The badge huntsman (Neosparassus) is larger still, brown, and hairy. The tropical or brown huntsman (Heteropoda) is also large and hairy, with mottled brown, white, and black markings. The eyesight of these spiders is not as good as that of the Salticidae (jumping spiders). Nevertheless, their vision is quite sufficient to detect approaching humans or other large animals from some distance.

== Identification ==
They can be distinguished from other spider families by their appearance, as other spiders similar to them are smaller in size. They are often confused for tarantulas due to their hairy nature, but can easily be distinguished by their laterigrade legs, similar to those of crabs. Members of this family are also typically less bulky than tarantulas. They possess two claws, as is the case for most spiders that actively hunt their prey. They also possess eight eyes divided into two regular rows.

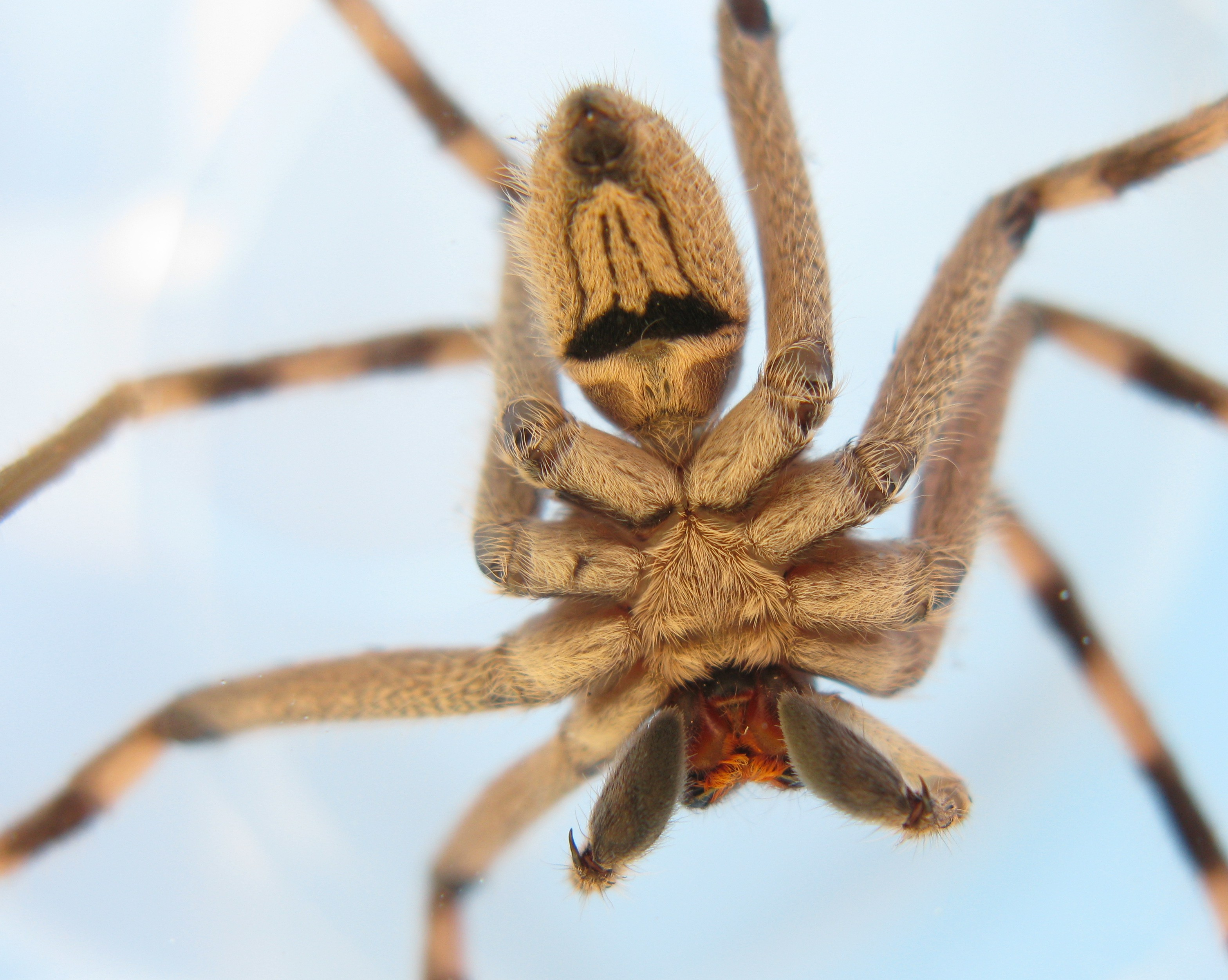
Palystes superciliosus, ventral aspect, showing aposematic coloration, plus typically masculine gracile build and clavate pedipalps armed with mating spurs

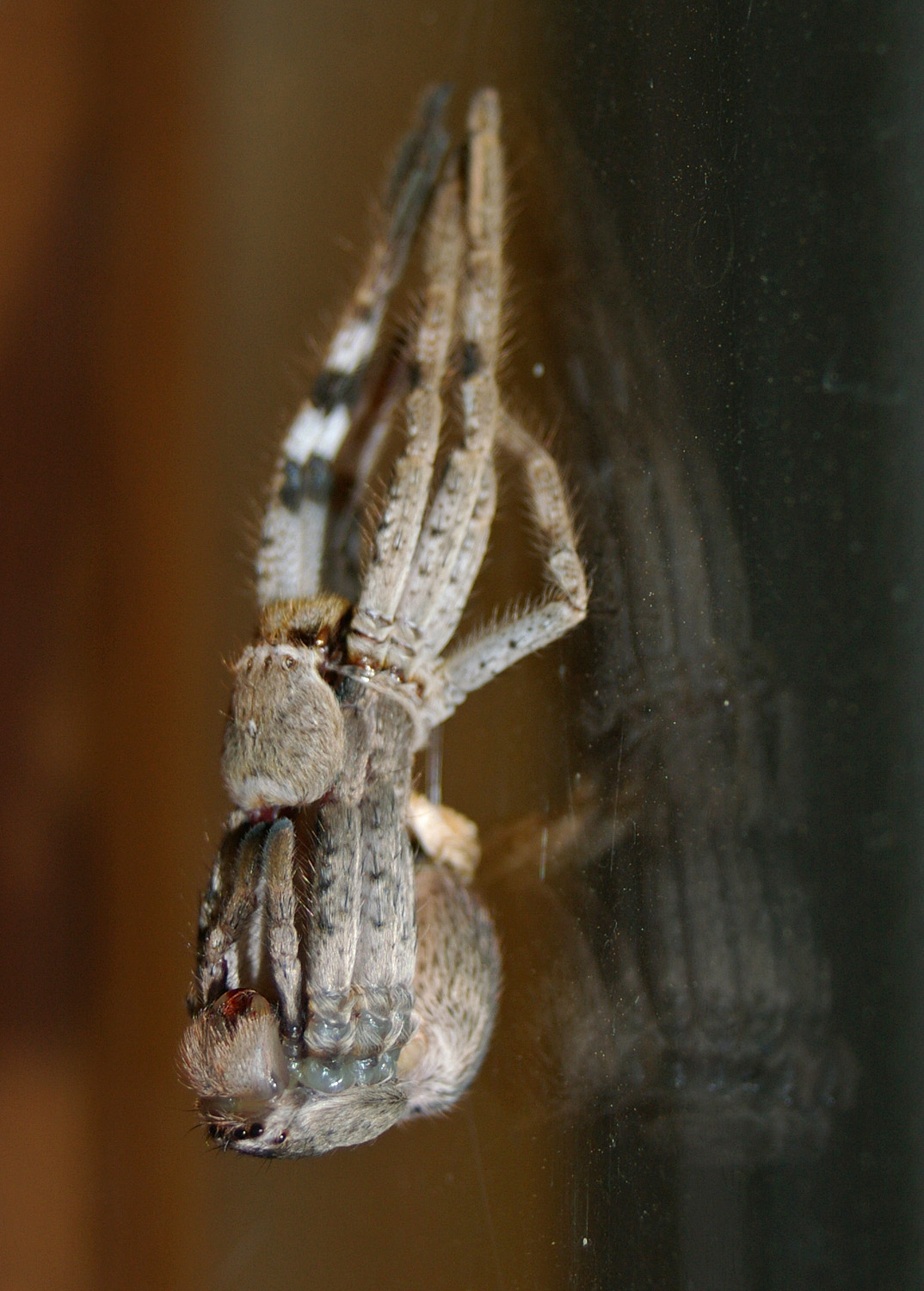
Isopeda villosa extricating itself from its old exoskeleton

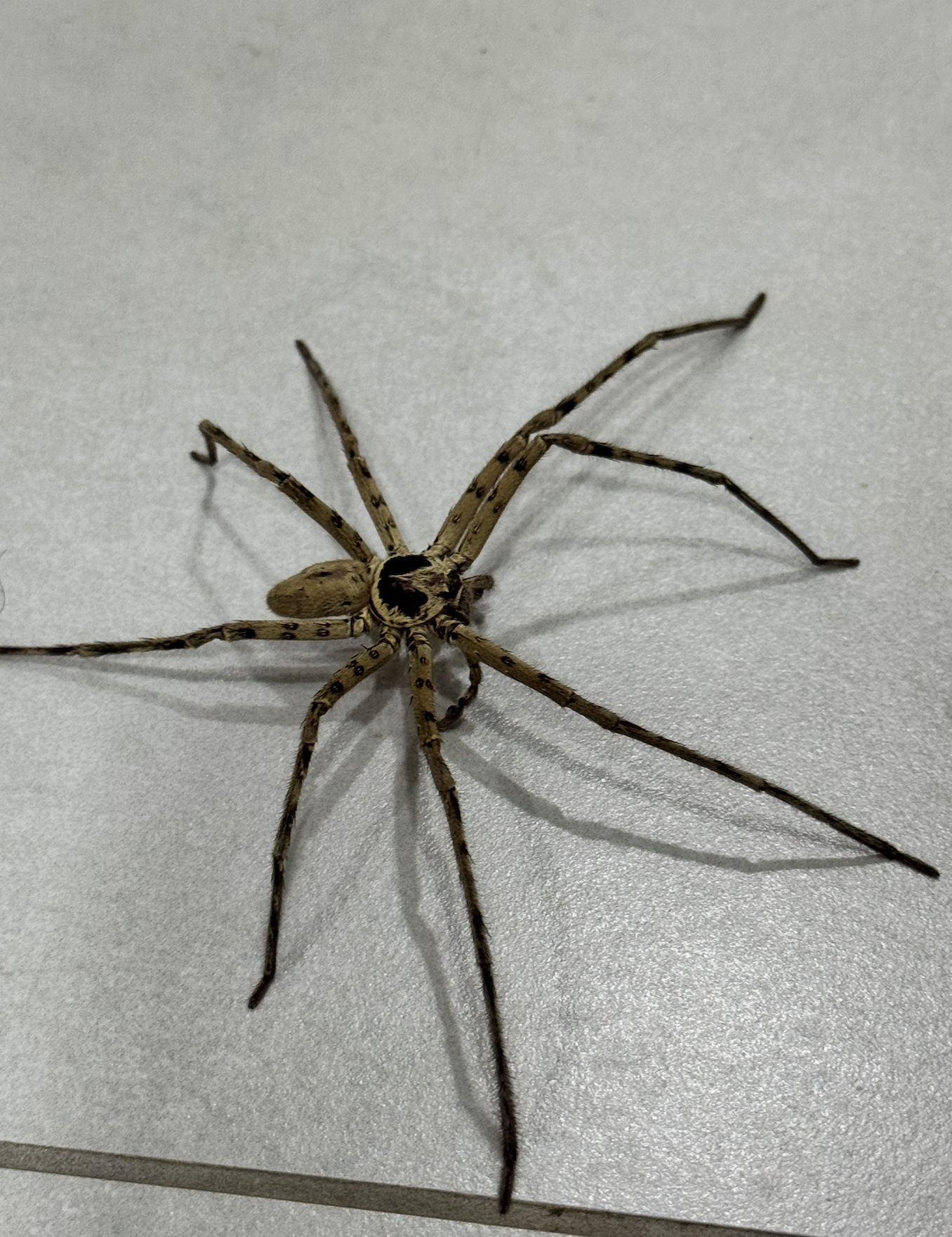
Adult Huntsman spider (Sparassidae) from Seychelles resting on a tiled floor.

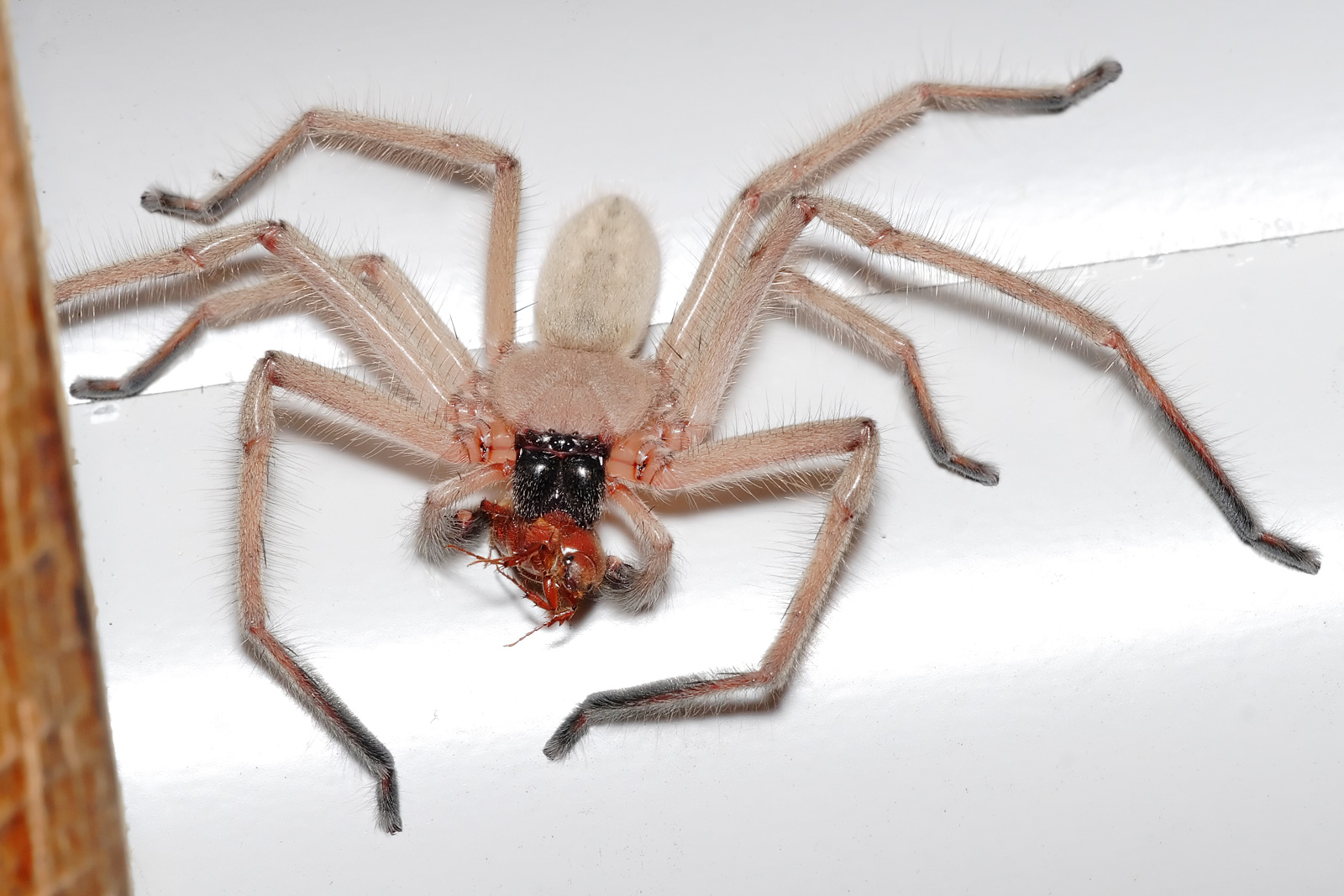
A huntsman spider consuming a small beetle

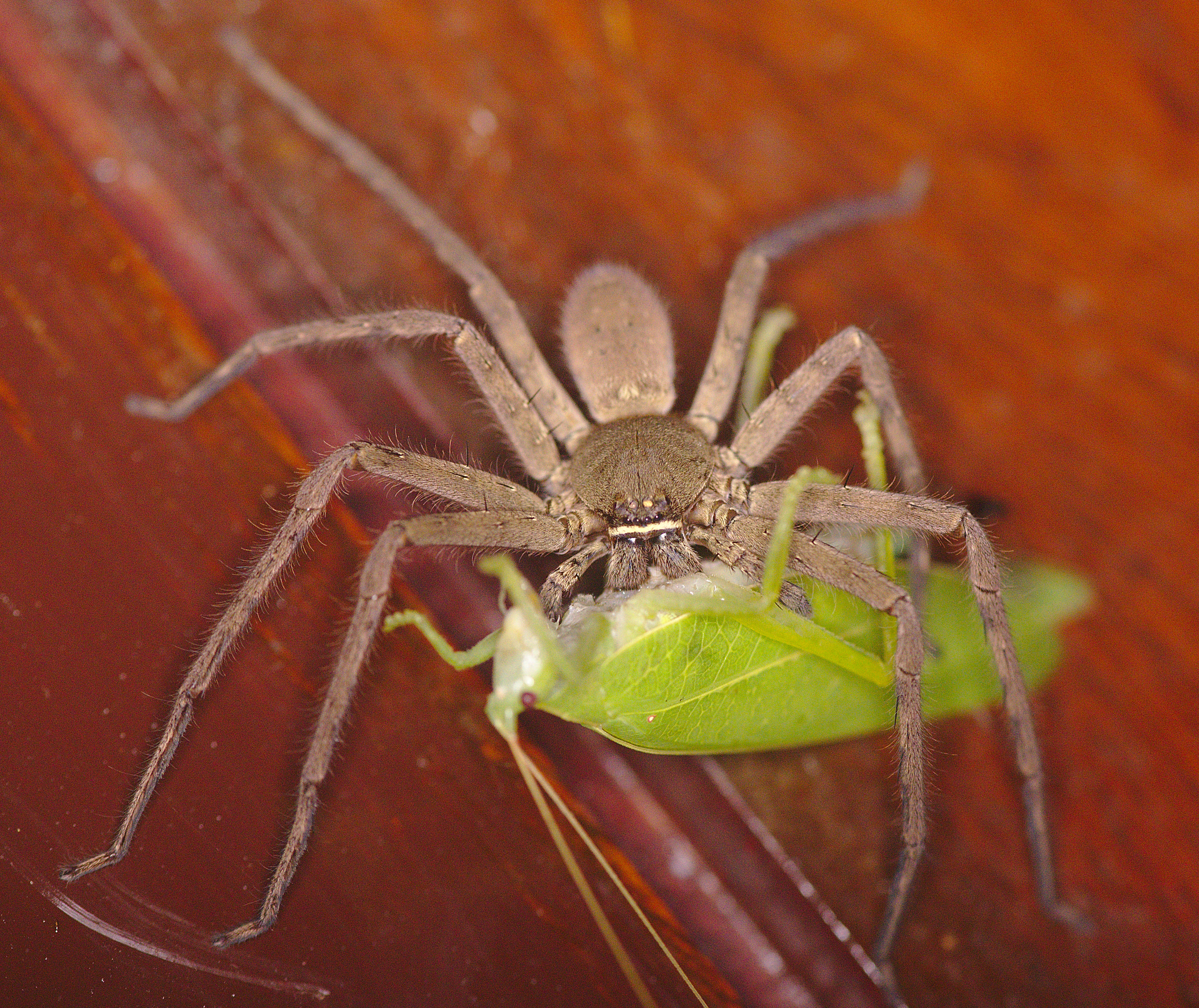
A female Heteropoda venatoria consuming a katydid

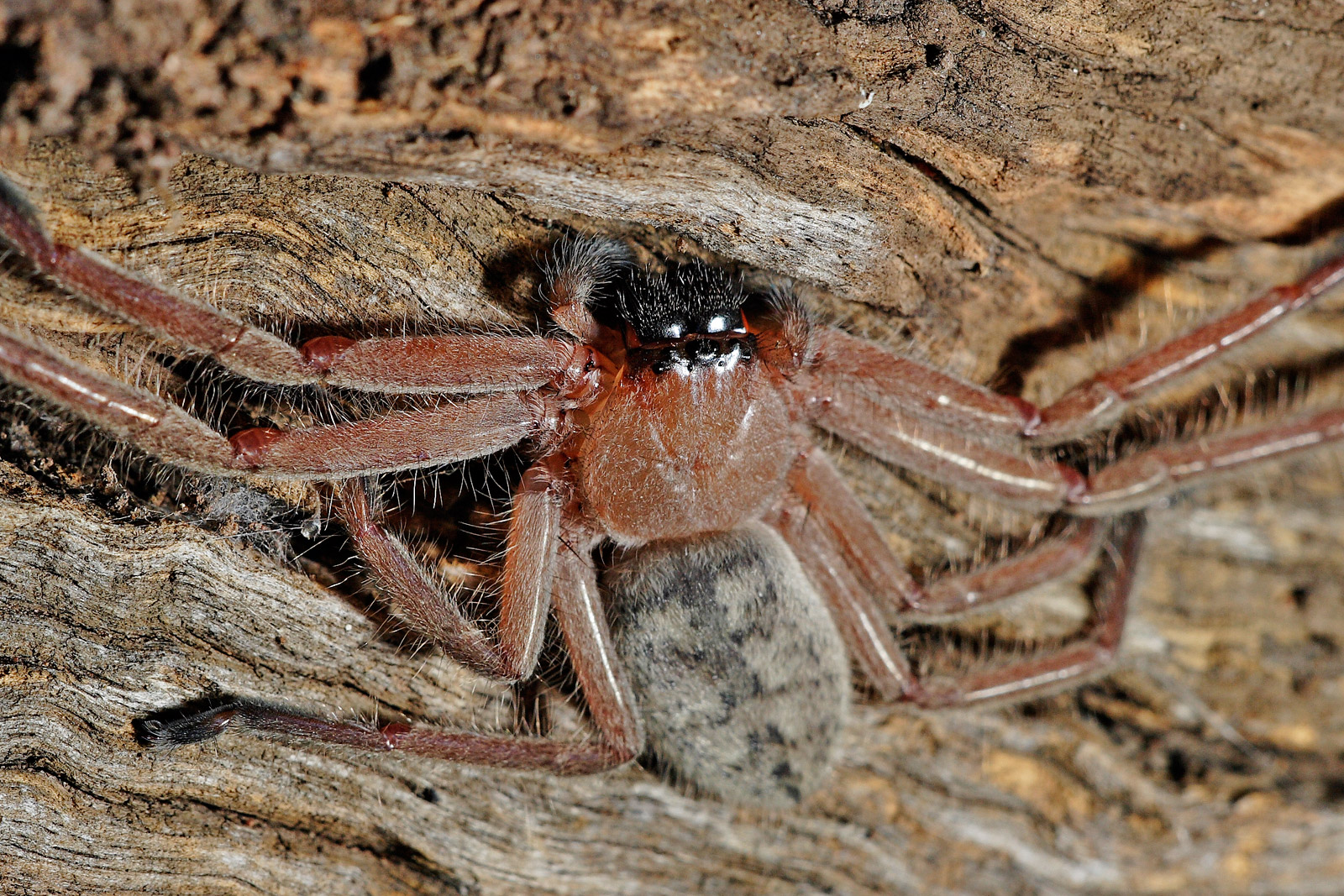
Adult social huntsman Delena cancerides on the underside of a log in Victoria, Australia

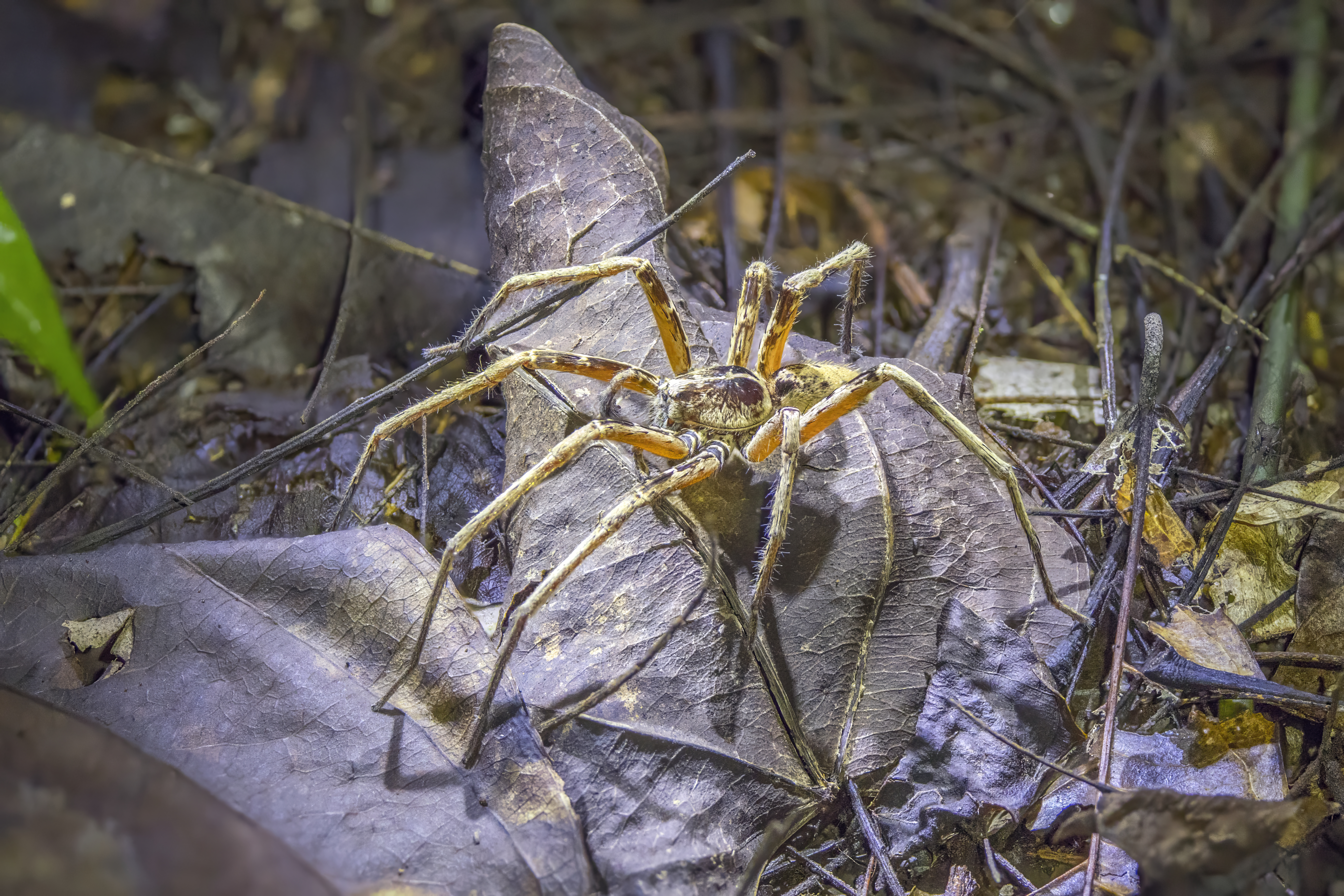
Unidentified species in Ghana

== Behavior ==
As adults, huntsman spiders do not build webs, but hunt and forage for food; their diet consists primarily of insects and other invertebrates, and occasionally small skinks and geckos. They live in the crevices of tree bark, but frequently wander into homes and vehicles. They are able to travel extremely quickly, often using a springing jump while running, and walk on walls and even on ceilings. They also tend to exhibit a "cling" reflex if picked up, making them difficult to shake off and much more likely to bite. The females are fierce defenders of their egg sacs and young. They generally make a threat display if provoked, and if the warning is ignored, they may attack and bite.

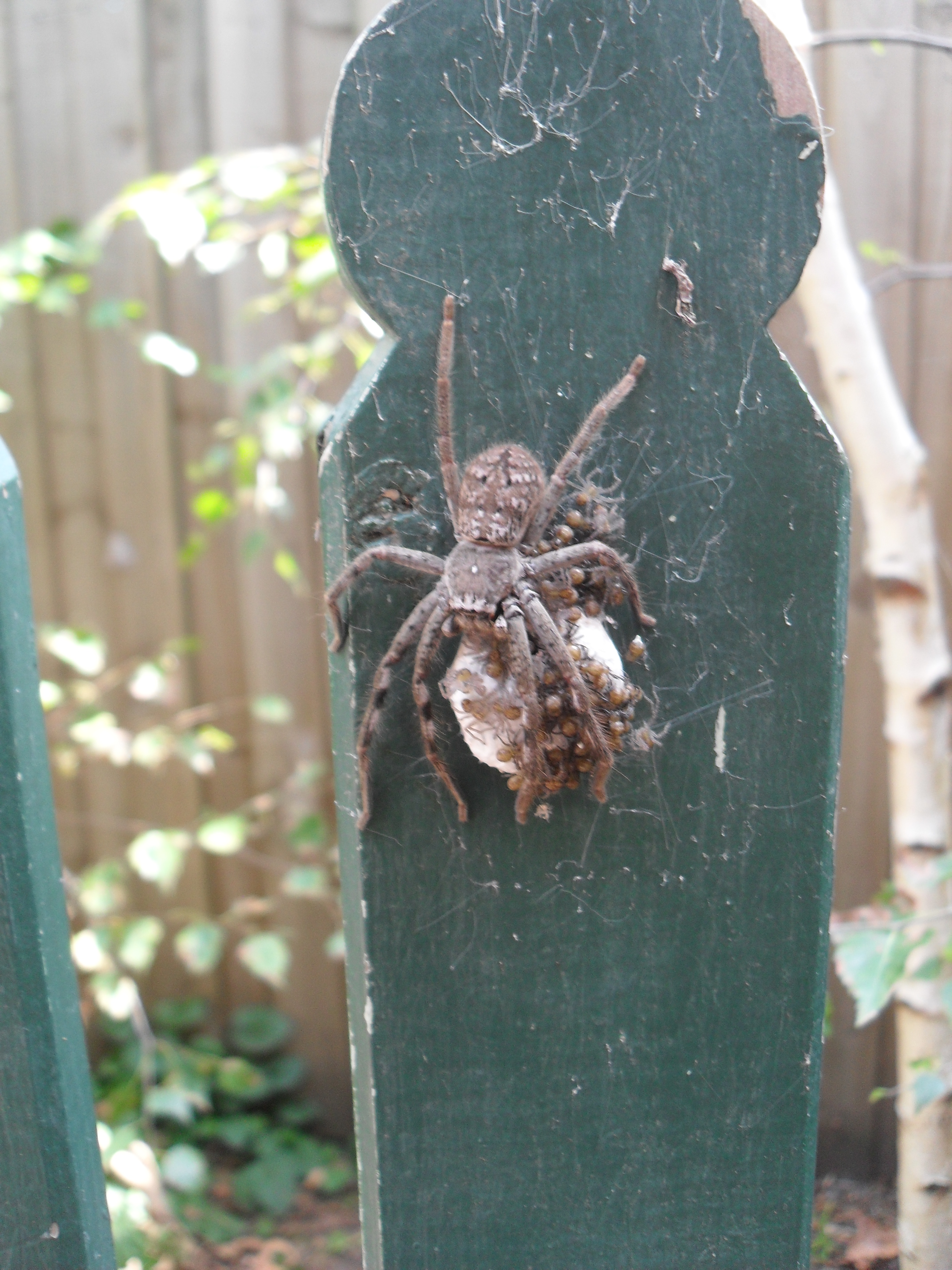
Australian sparassid egg sac hatching

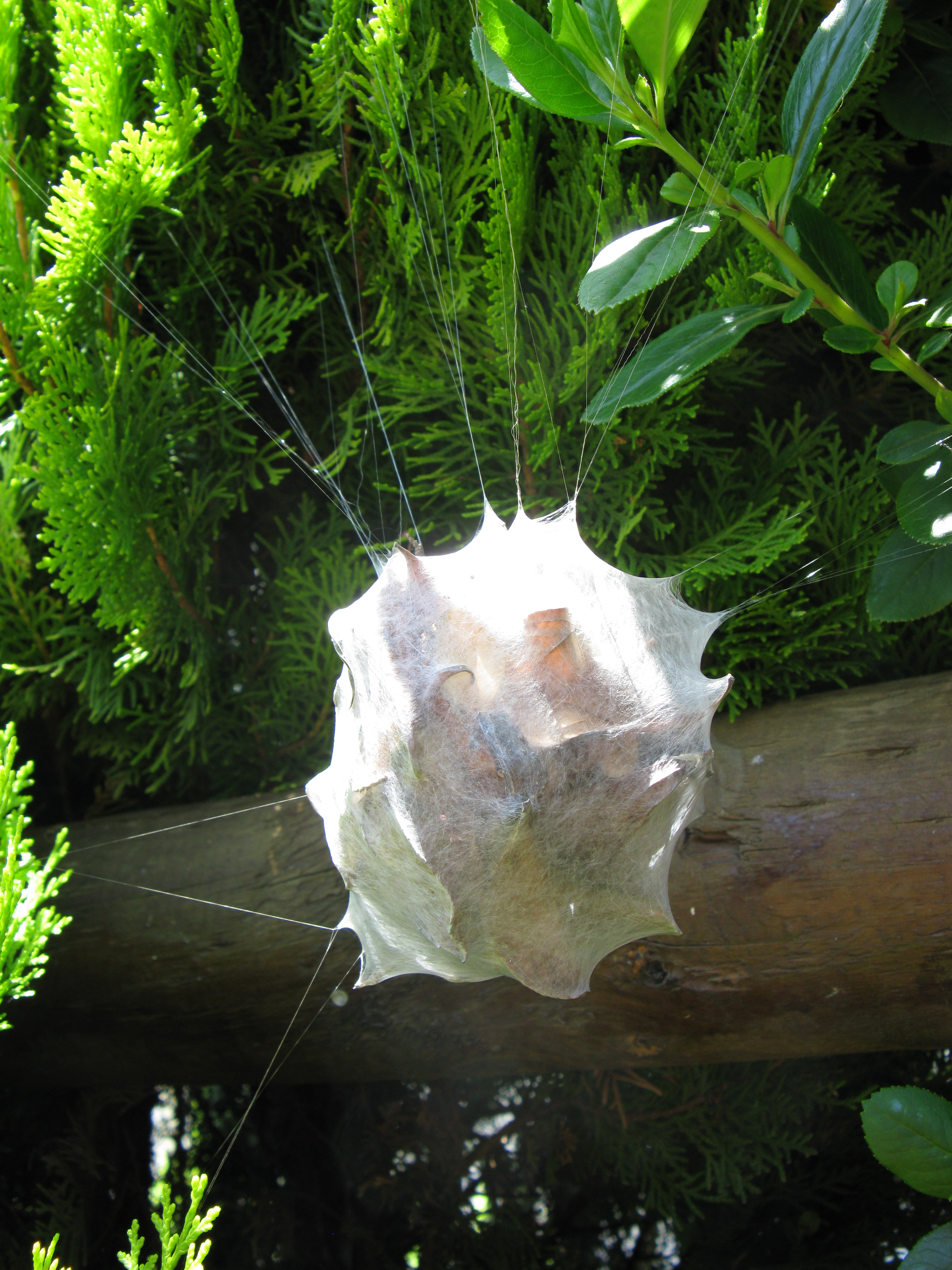
Palystes castaneus egg purse

The egg sacs differ fairly widely among the various genera. For example, in Heteropoda species, egg sacs are carried underneath the female's body, while in other species, such as Palystes and Pseudomicrommata, females generally attach egg sacs to vegetation.

=== Sound production in mating rituals ===
Males of the huntsman spider Heteropoda venatoria have recently been found to deliberately make a substrate-borne sound when they detect a chemical (pheromone) left by a nearby female of their species. The males anchor themselves firmly to the surface onto which they have crawled and then use their legs to transmit vibrations from their bodies to the surface. Most of the sound emitted is produced by strong vibrations of the abdomen. The characteristic frequency of vibration and the pattern of bursts of sound identify them to females of their species, which approach if they are interested in mating. This sound can often be heard as a rhythmic ticking, somewhat like a quartz clock, which fades in and out and can be heard by human ears in a relatively quiet environment.

== Size, venom, and aggression ==
On average, a huntsman spider's leg span can reach up to 15 cm (5.9 in), while their bodies measure about 1.8 cm (0.7 in) long. Like most spiders, Sparassidae spiders use venom to immobilize prey.

Members of various genera, such as Palystes, Neosparassus, and several others, reportedly have inflicted severe bites on humans. The effects vary, including local swelling and pain, nausea, headache, vomiting, irregular pulse rate, and heart palpitations, indicating some systemic neurotoxin effects, especially when the bites were severe or repeated. However, the formal study of spider bites is fraught with complications, including unpredictable infections, dry bites, shock, nocebo effects, and even bite misdiagnosis by medical professionals and specimen misidentification by the general public.

What provokes Sparassidae spiders to attack and bite humans and animals is not always clear, but female members of this family are known to defend their egg sacs and young against perceived threats aggressively. Bites from sparassids usually do not require hospital treatment.

== Genera ==
As of January 2026, this family includes 99 genera and 1,550 species:

- Adcatomus Karsch, 1880 – Peru, Venezuela
- Anaptomecus Simon, 1903 – Costa Rica, Panama, Colombia, Ecuador
- Anchonastus Simon, 1898 – Cameroon, Democratic Republic of the Congo, Equatorial Guinea
- Arandisa Lawrence, 1938 – Namibia, South Africa
- Barylestis Simon, 1909 – Africa, China, Myanmar, Thailand
- Beregama Hirst, 1990 – Indonesia, Australia, Papua New Guinea
- Berlandia Lessert, 1921 – Tanzania
- Bhutaniella Jäger, 2000 – China, Taiwan, Bhutan, India, Nepal
- Borniella Grall & Jäger, 2022 – Borneo
- Caayguara Rheims, 2010 – Brazil
- Carparachne Lawrence, 1962 – Namibia
- Cebrennus Simon, 1880 – Africa, Asia, Canary Islands, Malta, Spain
- Cerbalus Simon, 1897 – Israel, Jordan, Canary Islands, North Africa
- Chrosioderma Simon, 1897 – Madagascar
- Clastes Walckenaer, 1837 – Indonesia, Papua New Guinea
- Cuiambuca Rheims, 2023 – Brazil
- Curicaberis Rheims, 2015 – Costa Rica, Guatemala, Nicaragua, Mexico, United States, Brazil
- Damastes Simon, 1880 – Madagascar, Mozambique, Seychelles
- Decaphora Franganillo, 1931 – North America, Colombia
- Deelemanikara Jäger, 2021 – Madagascar
- Defectrix Petrunkevitch, 1925 – Panama
- Delena Walckenaer, 1837 – Australia. Introduced to New Zealand
- Dermochrosia Mello-Leitão, 1940 – Brazil
- Diminutella Rheims & Alayón, 2018 – Cuba
- Eusparassus Simon, 1903 – Africa, Asia, Greece, Portugal, Spain, Peru. Introduced to the Netherlands
- Exopalystes Hogg, 1914 – New Guinea
- Extraordinarius Rheims, 2019 – Brazil
- Geminia Thorell, 1897 – Myanmar
- Gnathopalystes Rainbow, 1899 – Asia, Australia, Papua New Guinea, Solomon Islands, Vanuatu
- Guadana Rheims, 2010 – South America
- Heteropoda Latreille, 1804 – Asia, Australia, Melanesia, Colombia, Peru
- Holconia Thorell, 1877 – Australia
- Irileka Hirst, 1998 – Australia
- Isopeda L. Koch, 1875 – Philippines, Australia, New Caledonia, Papua New Guinea. Introduced to New Zealand
- Isopedella Hirst, 1990 – Indonesia, Australia, New Guinea
- Keilira Hirst, 1989 – Australia
- Leucorchestris Lawrence, 1962 – Angola, Namibia
- Macrinus Simon, 1887 – United States, Brazil, Colombia, Venezuela, Tobago
- Martensikara Jäger, 2021 – Madagascar
- Martensopoda Jäger, 2006 – India
- May Jäger & Krehenwinkel, 2015 – Namibia, South Africa
- Megaloremmius Simon, 1903 – Madagascar
- Menarik Grall & Jäger, 2022 – Malaysia
- Meri Rheims & Jäger, 2022 – Dominica, Martinique, St. Vincent, Panama, South America, Guadelupe, Trinidad & Tobago
- Micrommata Latreille, 1804 – Zimbabwe, Sierra Leone, Asia, Russia, Southern Europe, North Africa
- Micropoda Grall & Jäger, 2022 – Papua New Guinea
- Microrchestris Lawrence, 1962 – Namibia
- Nativus Casas & Rheims, 2023 – South America
- Neosparassus Hogg, 1903 – Australia
- Neostasina Rheims & Alayón, 2016 – North America, British Virgin Islands
- Nolavia Kammerer, 2006 – Costa Rica, Mexico, Brazil, Colombia, Venezuela, US Virgin Islands
- Nungara Pinto & Rheims, 2016 – Brazil, Ecuador, French Guiana
- Olios Walckenaer, 1837 – Africa, Asia, Canary Islands, Ukraine, Cyprus, Costa Rica, Guatemala, Panama, Mexico, United States, Australia, New Caledonia, New Guinea, South America. Introduced to Central Europe, Netherlands
- Orchestrella Lawrence, 1965 – Namibia
- Origes Simon, 1897 – Argentina, Ecuador, Peru
- Paenula Simon, 1897 – Ecuador
- Palystella Lawrence, 1928 – Namibia, South Africa
- Palystes L. Koch, 1875 – Africa, Australia, New Caledonia, Solomon Islands
- Panaretella Lawrence, 1937 – South Africa
- Pandercetes L. Koch, 1875 – Southeast Asia, India, Sri Lanka, Australia, New Guinea, Papua New Guinea, New Zealand
- Papiri Rheims, 2025 – Brazil
- Parapalystes Croeser, 1996 – South Africa
- Pediana Simon, 1880 – Australia
- Platnickopoda Jäger, 2020 – Tanzania, East Africa
- Pleorotus Simon, 1898 – Seychelles
- Polybetes Simon, 1897 – South America
- Prusias O. Pickard-Cambridge, 1892 – Panama, Mexico, Brazil, Peru
- Prychia L. Koch, 1875 – Philippines, New Guinea
- Pseudomicrommata Järvi, 1912 – Africa, Iran
- Pseudopoda Jäger, 2000 – Asia
- Quemedice Mello-Leitão, 1942 – Argentina, Brazil, Colombia
- Remmius Simon, 1897 – Cameroon, DR Congo, Equatorial Guinea, Senegal
- Rhacocnemis Simon, 1898 – Seychelles
- Rhitymna Simon, 1897 – Comoros, Madagascar, Asia
- Sadala Simon, 1880 – Panama, South America
- Sagellula Strand, 1942 – Japan
- Sarotesius Pocock, 1898 – East Africa
- Sinopoda Jäger, 1999 – Asia, Borneo
- Sivalicus Dyal, 1957 – India
- Sparianthina Banks, 1929 – Trinidad and Tobago, Costa Rica, Panama, Colombia, Guyana, Venezuela
- Sparianthis Simon, 1880 – Trinidad and Tobago, Panama, South America, St. Vincent and the Grenadines
- Spariolenus Simon, 1880 – Asia
- Staianus Simon, 1889 – Madagascar
- Stasina Simon, 1877 – Gabon, Philippines, Singapore, Cuba, Brazil, Venezuela
- Stasinoides Berland, 1922 – Ethiopia
- Stipax Simon, 1898 – Seychelles
- Strandiellum Kolosváry, 1934 – Papua New Guinea
- Thelcticopis Karsch, 1884 – Gabon, São Tomé and Príncipe, Asia, Fiji, Papua New Guinea, Tonga
- Thomasettia Hirst, 1911 – Seychelles
- Thunberga Jäger, 2020 – Madagascar, Mayotte
- Tibellomma Simon, 1903 – Venezuela
- Tiomaniella Grall & Jäger, 2022 – Malaysia
- Tychicus (spider) Simon, 1880 – Indonesia, Philippines, New Guinea, Papua New Guinea, Admiralty Islands
- Typostola Simon, 1897 – Australia, Papua New Guinea
- Uaica Rheims, 2025 – Brazil
- Uaiuara Rheims, 2013 – Panama, South America
- Vindullus Simon, 1880 – Guatemala, South America
- Yiinthi Davies, 1994 – Indonesia, Australia
- Zachria L. Koch, 1875 – Australia

== See also ==
- Cultural depictions of spiders § Modern myths and urban legends
- Spider wasp
- Table of spider families

== Bibliography ==
- Abdullah Bayram & Sevda Özdağ (2002). "Micrommata virescens (Clerck, 1757), a new species for the spider fauna of Turkey (Araneae, Sparassidae)" (PDF). Turkish Journal of Zoology. 26 (3): 305–307. ISSN 1300-0179. (electronic). Archived (PDF) from the original on 2020-10-05.
