= Epigyne =

External genital structure of female spiders

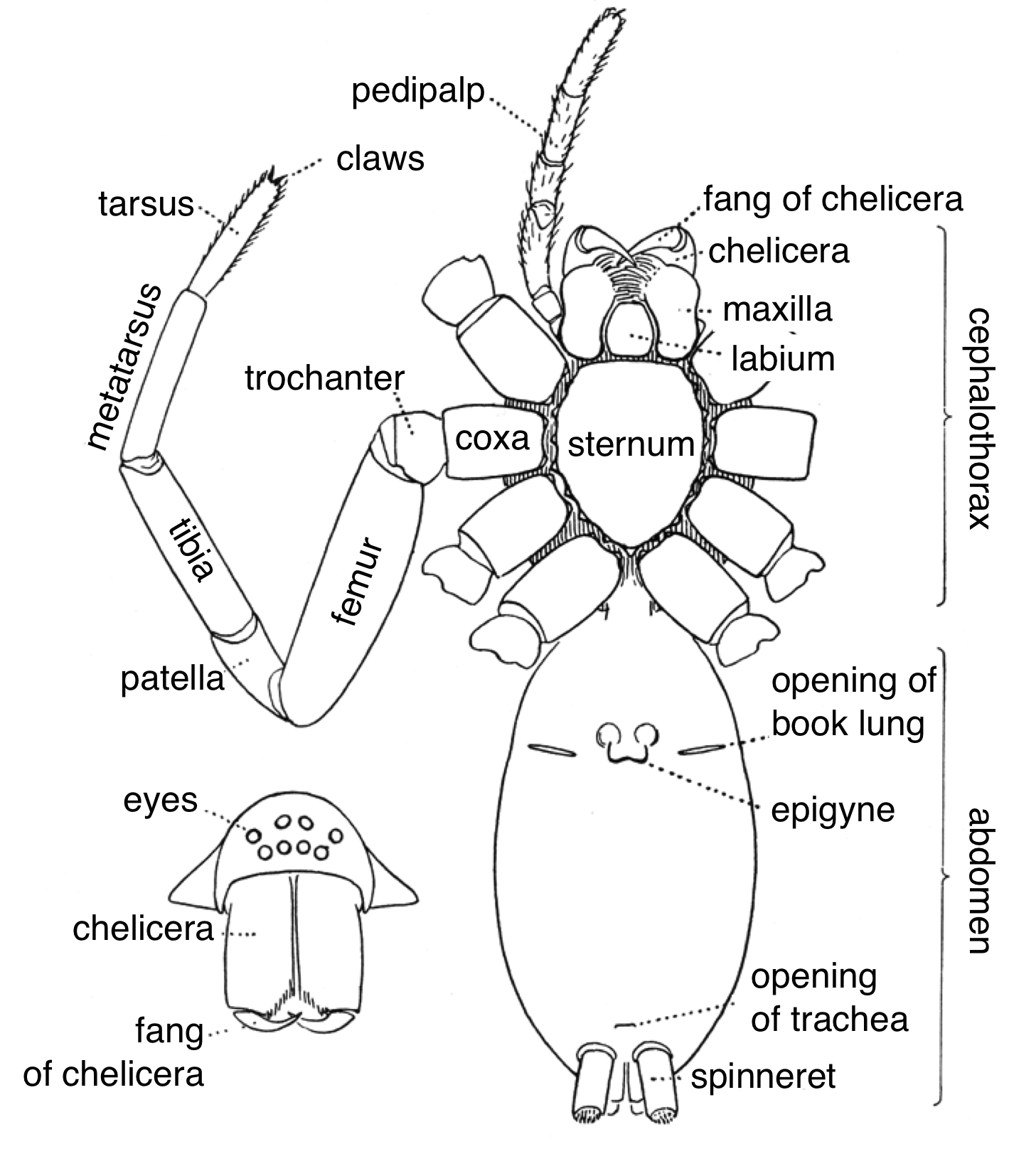
The external anatomy of a spider, with the epigyne labeled

The internal anatomy of a spider, with the reproductive system (purple) reaching the exoskeleton at the epigyne

The epigyne or epigynum is the external genital structure of female spiders. As the epigyne varies greatly in form in different species, even in closely related ones, it often provides the most distinctive characteristic for recognizing species. It consists of a small, hardened portion of the exoskeleton located on the underside of the abdomen, in front of the epigastric furrow and between the epigastric plates.

== Functions ==
The primary function of the epigyne is to receive and direct the palpal organ of the male during copulation. The various specific forms of epigynes are correlated, in each case, with corresponding specific differences in the palpus of the male. This specialization prevents individuals of different species from mating. The epigyne covers or accompanies the openings of the spermathecae, which are pouches for receiving and retaining sperm. Frequently, the openings of the spermathecae are on the outer face of the epigyne and can be easily seen.

In some spiders, it has been theorized that some of the structures of the epigyne may aid in the laying of eggs, akin to an ovipositor.

== Differences in form ==
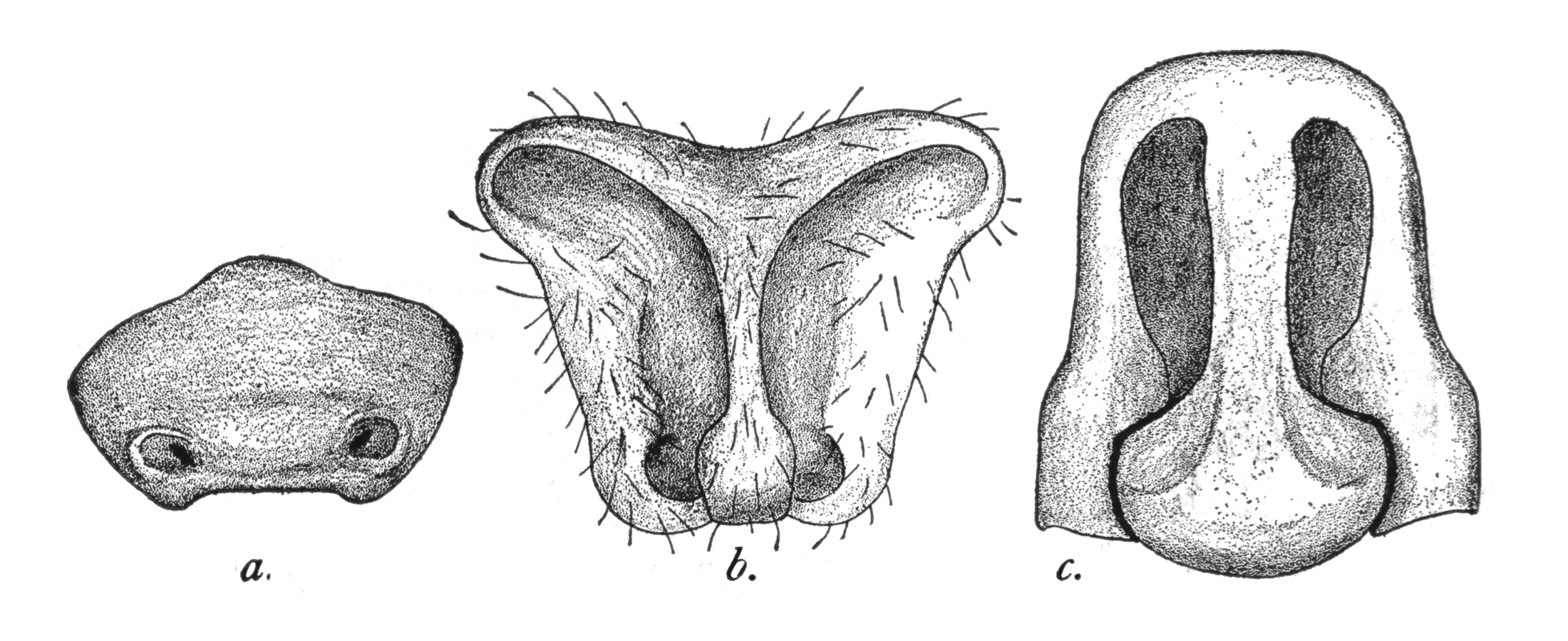
Three different types of epigyne: (a) Pirata montanus, (b) Trabeops aurantiacus, (c) Geolycosa pikei

An example of a comparatively simple epigyne is that of Pirata montanus. It consists of a nearly plain plate, with the openings of the spermathecae near the posterior lateral corners. A somewhat more complicated form is illustrated by the epigyne of Trabeops aurantiacus. In this species, the plate is depressed or furrowed longitudinally, and the depressed area is divided by a ridge-like elevation, which divides the depression into two furrows or channels, each of which leads to the opening of the spermatheca of the corresponding side. This ridge-like elevation is called the guide, as its function "seems clearly to be that of a guide to the male embolus, controlling the course of the latter and facilitating its entrance to the spermatheca." In many cases the guide extends laterally on each side at its posterior end. This is true to a slight extent in the epigyne of Trabeops, but more markedly so in that of many species of Geolycosa, where the lateral expansions often conceal the openings of the spermathecae, as in the epigyne of Geolycosa pikei.

A more complicated form of epigyne is found in spiders of the genus Araneus, where there is developed an appendage which is usually soft and flexible, and which is termed the scape or ovipositor. When there is a well-developed scape, the tip of it is usually more or less spoon-shaped. This part of the scape is termed the cochlear. The basal plate of the epigyne which bears the scape, and which forms a porch or hood that covers the opening of the oviduct is called the atriolum.

A still more complicated form of epigyne is found in some of the sheet weavers (Linyphiidae) and orb weavers (Araneidae), where the ovipositor consists of two finger-like projections: first, the more common one, the scape, which arises from the atriolum, and consequently in front of the opening of the oviduct; and second, one which arises behind the opening of the oviduct; this is termed the parmula. Each of these projections may be grooved on the side facing the oviduct, forming a tube.

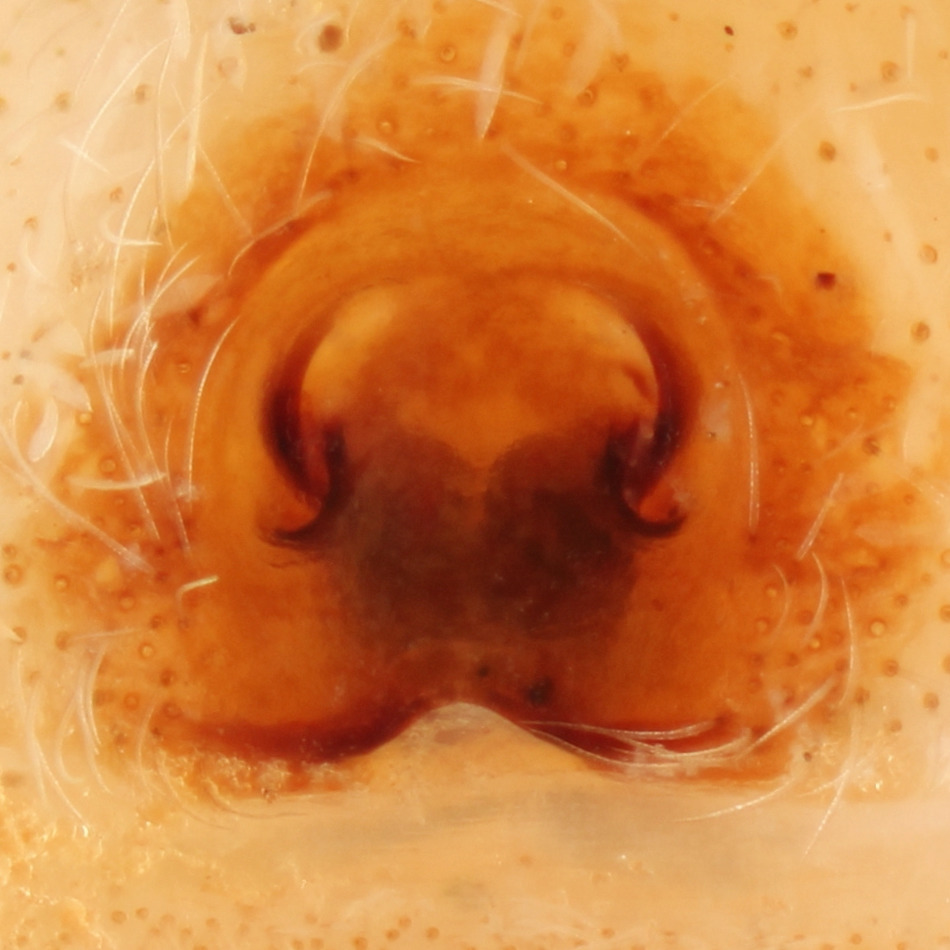
Paraphidippus aurantius

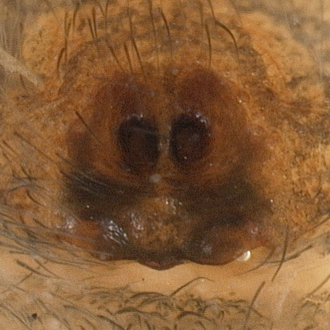
Hakka himeshimensis

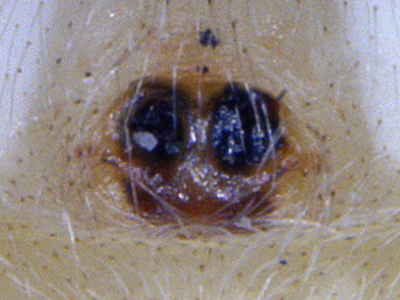
Colonus puerperus

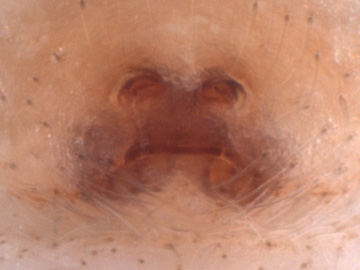
Hentzia chekika

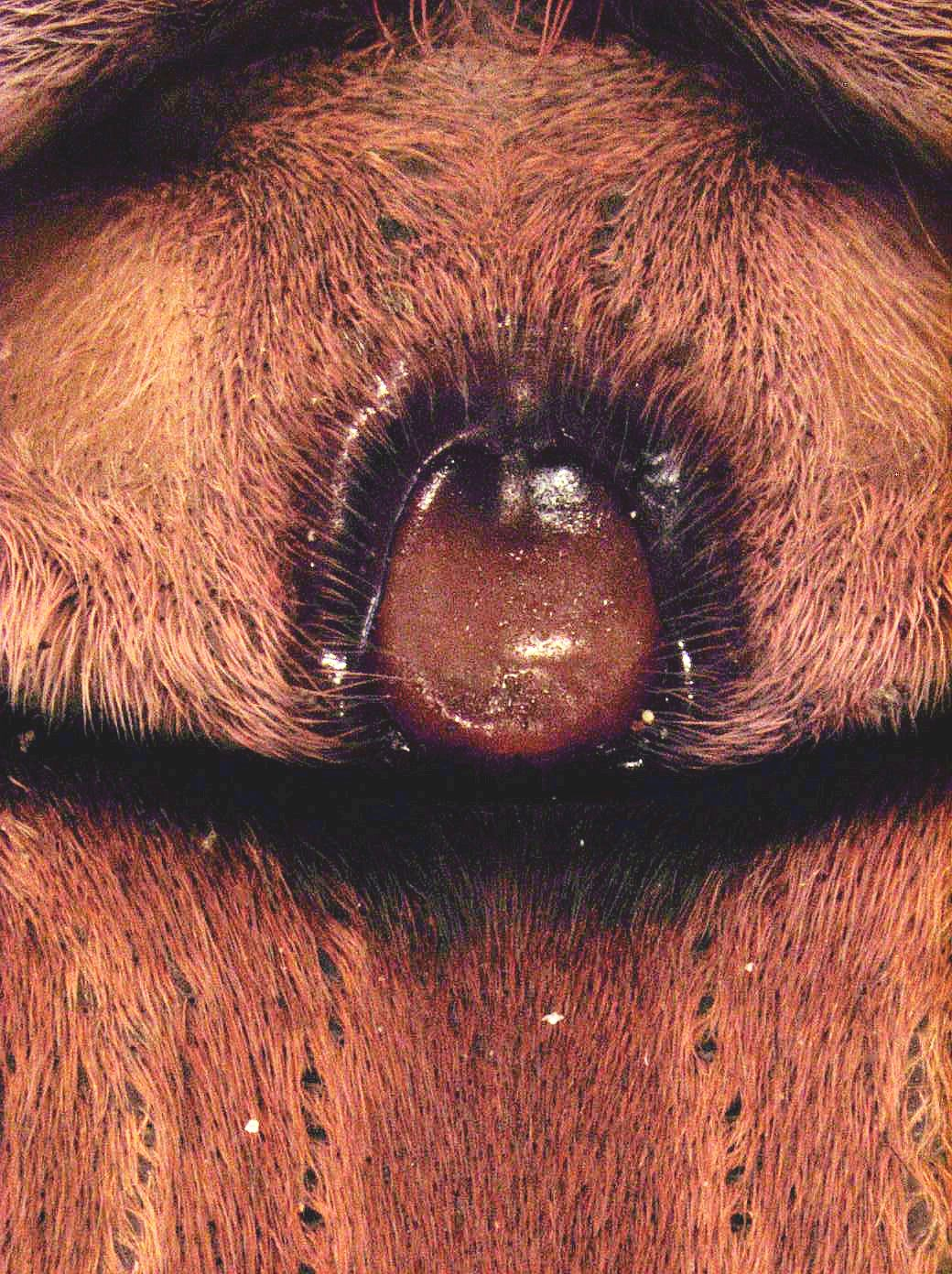
Isopeda sp., probably Isopeda villosa
