= E. xera =

E. xera may refer to:

- Eriopyga xera, Dyar, 1914, a moth species in the genus Eriopyga
- Exerodonta xera, a frog species endemic to Mexico

== See also ==
- Xera (disambiguation)
