= Xera =

Xera may refer to:

- Xera (band), a Spanish band
- Xera (comics), a DC Comics character
- a character played by Bianca King in the Filipino telefantasya Atlantika
- a character in The Belgariad and The Malloreon

Places

- the Valencian name for the municipality of Chera in the province of Valencia, Spain
- an ancient city on the Turkish island of Kekova
- an ancient Phoenician city, now Jerez de la Frontera in the province of Cádiz in Andalusia, Spain

Biology

- Xera (phasmid), a walking stick genus
- Geolycosa xera, McCrone, 1963, a spider species in the genus Geolycosa and the family Lycosidae found in the USA
- Hydroptila xera, a microcaddisflies species in the genus Hydroptila
- Ischnothele xera, a spider species in the genus Ischnothele and the family Dipluridae

Radio

- XERA-AM, a radio station in San Cristóbal de las Casas, Chiapas, Mexico
- XERA (Villa Acuña), a former "boarder blaster" station in Villa Acuña, Coahuila, Mexico, active from 1935 to 1939
