= Geolycosa subvittata =

Cape Geolycosa wolf spider

Scientific classification
- Kingdom: Animalia
- Phylum: Arthropoda
- Subphylum: Chelicerata
- Class: Arachnida
- Order: Araneae
- Infraorder: Araneomorphae
- Family: Lycosidae
- Genus: Geolycosa
- Species: G. subvittata

Binomial name
- Geolycosa subvittata (Pocock, 1900)

Synonyms
- Lycosa subvittata Pocock, 1900; Tarentula subvittata Strand, 1907; Scaptocosa subvittata Roewer, 1955

Species of spider

Geolycosa subvittata is a species of spider in the family Lycosidae. It is endemic to South Africa and is commonly known as the Cape Geolycosa wolf spider.

== Distribution ==
Geolycosa subvittata is found in the Eastern Cape and Western Cape provinces of South Africa. Notable locations include Grahamstown (now Makhanda), Port Elizabeth, Table Mountain National Park, Kirstenbosch National Botanical Garden, and several other sites in the Cape region.

== Habitat and ecology ==
This species is a ground dweller known to live in burrows.

It has been sampled from the Fynbos and Thicket biomes at altitudes ranging from 5 to 552 m.

== Description ==
Known from both sexes, Geolycosa subvittata is smaller than the related G. hectoria but has a similar dorsal color pattern. It has two yellow stripes on the abdomen. Ventrally, it bears a median longitudinal black stripe.

The tibiae are not distinctly banded.

Males measure 11 mm in total length, while females measure 14 mm.

== Conservation ==
The species has a large range and is protected in Table Mountain National Park and Kirstenbosch National Botanical Garden.

However, most specimens were sampled around 1900, and the species is threatened by loss of habitat.

== Taxonomy ==
The species was originally described by Pocock in 1900 as Lycosa subvittata from Port Elizabeth. It was later revised by Roewer in 1959.
