= Geolycosa wrighti =

Scientific classification
- Kingdom: Animalia
- Phylum: Arthropoda
- Subphylum: Chelicerata
- Class: Arachnida
- Order: Araneae
- Infraorder: Araneomorphae
- Family: Lycosidae
- Genus: Geolycosa
- Species: G. wrighti

Binomial name
- Geolycosa wrighti (Emerton, 1912)

Species of spider

Geolycosa wrighti is a species of wolf spider in the family Lycosidae. It is found in the United States and Canada.
