= Geolycosa natalensis =

Durban Geolycosa wolf spider

Scientific classification
- Kingdom: Animalia
- Phylum: Arthropoda
- Subphylum: Chelicerata
- Class: Arachnida
- Order: Araneae
- Infraorder: Araneomorphae
- Family: Lycosidae
- Genus: Geolycosa
- Species: G. natalensis

Binomial name
- Geolycosa natalensis Roewer, 1960

Species of spider

Geolycosa natalensis is a species of spider in the family Lycosidae. It is endemic to South Africa and is commonly known as the Durban Geolycosa wolf spider.

== Distribution ==
Geolycosa natalensis is found only in KwaZulu-Natal province of South Africa, specifically in Durban.

== Habitat and ecology ==
This species is a free-running ground dweller sampled from the Indian Ocean Coastal Belt biome at an altitude of 17 m.

== Description ==
Geolycosa natalensis is known from both sexes.

The cephalothorax has a red-brown eye field that is finely black-edged, with light yellow, narrow, wavy-edged submarginal bands on each side. A light yellow median band is sharply angled and widened in front of the striae, with two dark long streaks and a median band with a pair of black dots behind. The eyes are circled in black, and the chelicerae are red-brown and frontally hairy yellow.

The abdomen is dorsally grey-brown, with a broad, pale yellowish, spindle-shaped median spot in front and narrow bow bands on each side. Behind these are yellowish oval spots with black dots in them. Ventrally, the sternum and coxae are uniformly pale yellow, while other leg segments are uniformly rust yellow.

== Conservation ==
The species is known only from the type locality with a limited range. More sampling is needed to determine the full geographic range.
