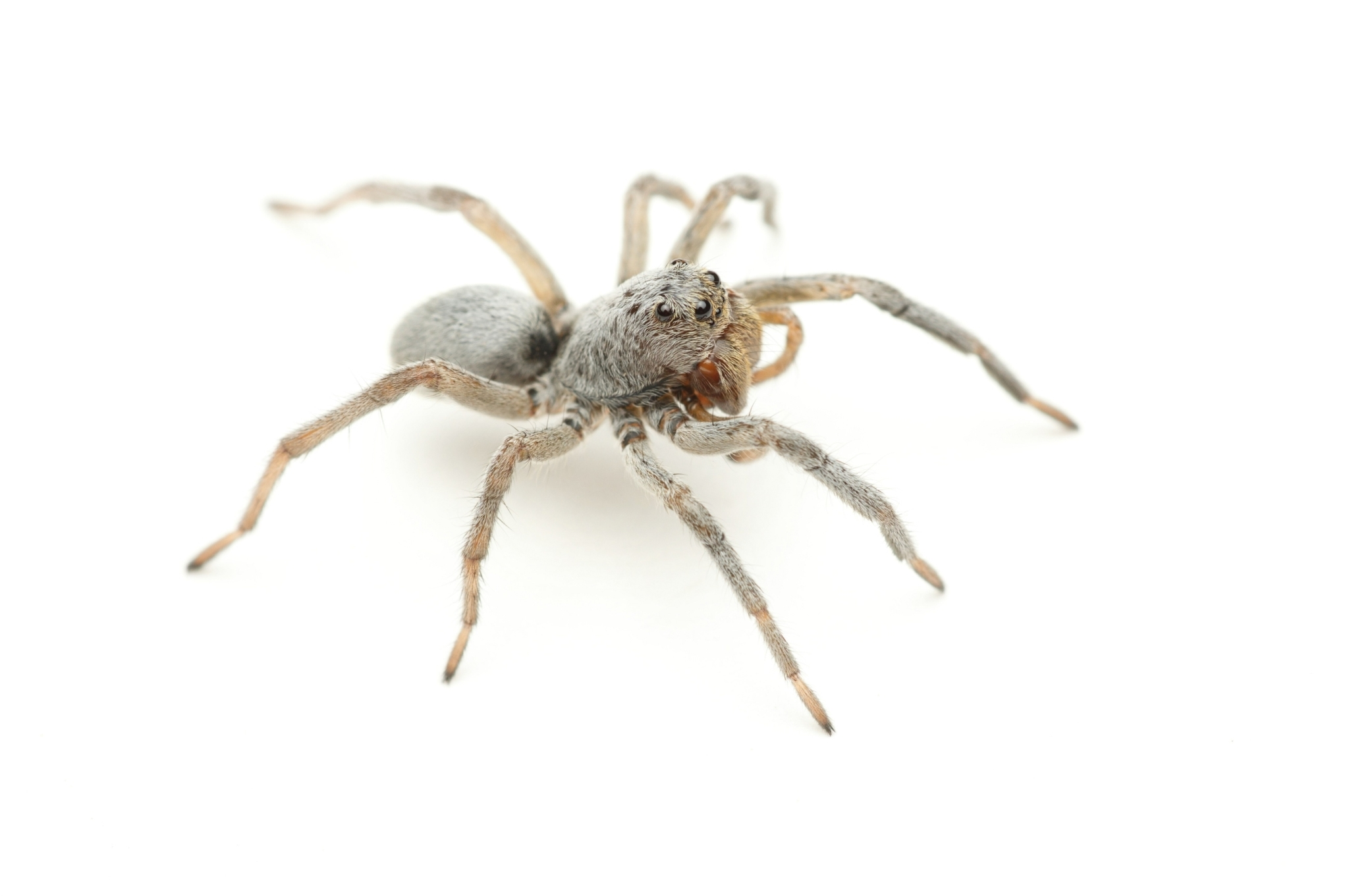

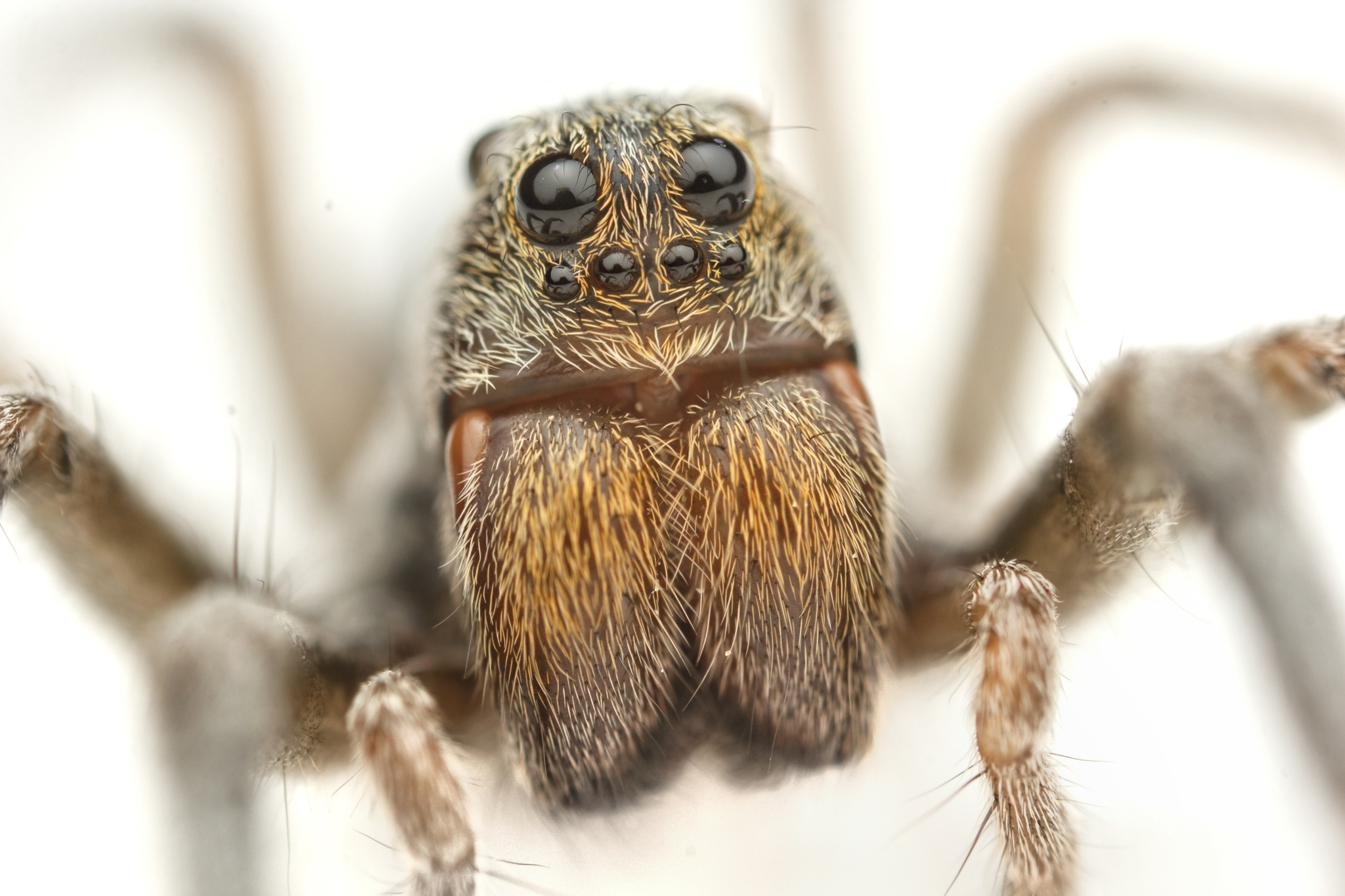

Scientific classification
- Kingdom: Animalia
- Phylum: Arthropoda
- Subphylum: Chelicerata
- Class: Arachnida
- Order: Araneae
- Infraorder: Araneomorphae
- Family: Lycosidae
- Genus: Geolycosa
- Species: G. gosoga

Binomial name
- Geolycosa gosoga (Chamberlin, 1925)

= Geolycosa gosoga =

Species of spider

Geolycosa gosoga is a species of wolf spider in the family Lycosidae. It is found in the United States.
