= Geolycosa rafaelana =

Scientific classification
- Kingdom: Animalia
- Phylum: Arthropoda
- Subphylum: Chelicerata
- Class: Arachnida
- Order: Araneae
- Infraorder: Araneomorphae
- Family: Lycosidae
- Genus: Geolycosa
- Species: G. rafaelana

Binomial name
- Geolycosa rafaelana (Chamberlin, 1928)

Species of spider

Geolycosa rafaelana is a black spider in the genus Geolycosa ("burrowing wolf spiders"), in the family Lycosidae ("wolf spiders"). It is found in western desert and scrubland habitats in the United States.
