= Geolycosa hubbelli =

Scientific classification
- Kingdom: Animalia
- Phylum: Arthropoda
- Subphylum: Chelicerata
- Class: Arachnida
- Order: Araneae
- Infraorder: Araneomorphae
- Family: Lycosidae
- Genus: Geolycosa
- Species: G. hubbelli

Binomial name
- Geolycosa hubbelli Wallace, 1942

Species of spider

Geolycosa hubbelli is a species of wolf spider in the family Lycosidae. It is found in the United States.
