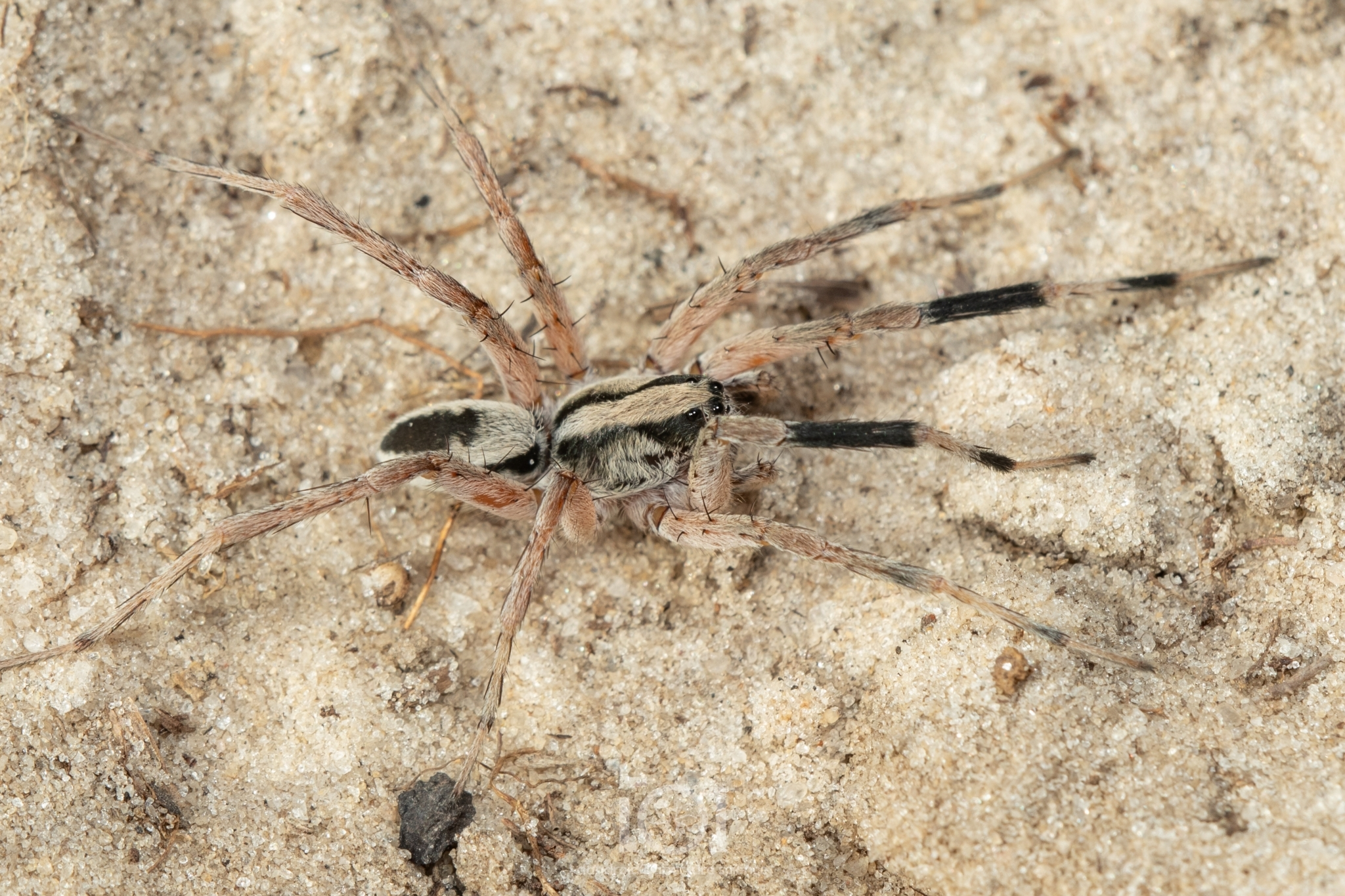

Scientific classification
- Kingdom: Animalia
- Phylum: Arthropoda
- Subphylum: Chelicerata
- Class: Arachnida
- Order: Araneae
- Infraorder: Araneomorphae
- Family: Lycosidae
- Genus: Geolycosa
- Species: G. ornatipes

Binomial name
- Geolycosa ornatipes (Bryant, 1935)

= Geolycosa ornatipes =

Species of spider

Geolycosa ornatipes is a species of wolf spider in the family Lycosidae. It is found in the United States.
