= Geolycosa nolotthensis =

Arid Geolycosa wolf spider

Scientific classification
- Kingdom: Animalia
- Phylum: Arthropoda
- Subphylum: Chelicerata
- Class: Arachnida
- Order: Araneae
- Infraorder: Araneomorphae
- Family: Lycosidae
- Genus: Geolycosa
- Species: G. nolotthensis

Binomial name
- Geolycosa nolotthensis (Simon, 1910)

Synonyms
- Lycosa nolotthensis Simon, 1910

Species of spider

Geolycosa nolotthensis is a species of spider in the family Lycosidae. It is found in Namibia and South Africa, and is commonly known as the arid Geolycosa wolf spider.

== Distribution ==
Geolycosa nolotthensis is found in Namibia and the Northern Cape province of South Africa.

In South Africa, it has been recorded from Kamaggas and Port Nolloth.

== Habitat and ecology ==
This species is a free-running ground dweller sampled from the Succulent Karoo biome at an altitude of 231 m.

== Description ==
Geolycosa nolotthensis is known from both sexes.

The cephalothorax has a blackish eye field with washed-out yellowish submarginal bands that show four white hair spots when dry. It has a pale yellow, whitish hairy median band at front and rear that is tapered and spindle-shaped, showing two pale dark long streaks in front of the striae.

The abdomen is dorsally blackish, with a median, pale hairy, black-trimmed lancet band in front. Behind this are four slightly dark median angular spots accompanied on each side by a row of four white hair spots visible only when dry. Ventrally, the sternum is uniformly black, with coxae lighter brown and remaining leg segments whitish hairy, though the posterior metatarsi and tarsi are darkened.

== Conservation ==
The species remains undersampled with a limited known range. More sampling is needed to determine the full geographic range.

== Etymology ==
The species is named after Port Nolloth in the Northern Cape, where the type specimen was collected.
