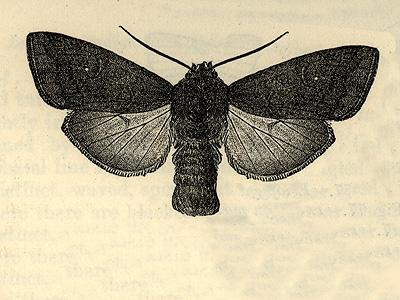

Scientific classification
- Kingdom: Animalia
- Phylum: Arthropoda
- Class: Insecta
- Order: Lepidoptera
- Superfamily: Noctuoidea
- Family: Noctuidae
- Genus: Eriopyga
- Species: E. crista

Binomial name
- Eriopyga crista (Walker, 1856)

Synonyms
- Mamestra crista Walker, 1856; Agrotis obscurus Dognin, 1889; Mamestra infernalis Schaus, 1894; Cirphis dissimilis Barnes & McDunnough, 1910

= Eriopyga crista =

Species of moth

Eriopyga crista is a moth of the family Noctuidae found from the southern United States (including Arizona) through Central America to South America and on the Antilles.
