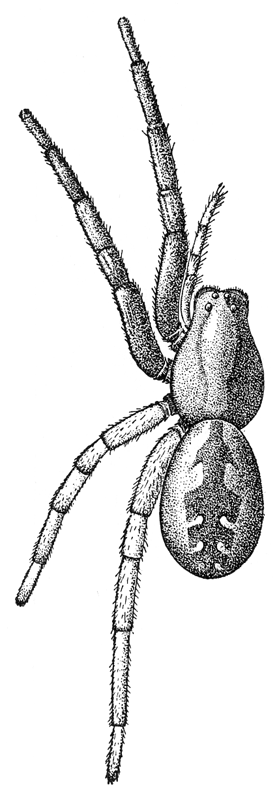

Scientific classification
- Kingdom: Animalia
- Phylum: Arthropoda
- Subphylum: Chelicerata
- Class: Arachnida
- Order: Araneae
- Infraorder: Araneomorphae
- Family: Lycosidae
- Genus: Geolycosa
- Species: G. turricola

Binomial name
- Geolycosa turricola (Treat, 1880)

= Geolycosa turricola =

Species of spider

Geolycosa turricola is a species of wolf spider in the family Lycosidae. It is found in the eastern United States and as far west as Ohio. The spider has a two year life cycle, with copulation occurring in late summer.
