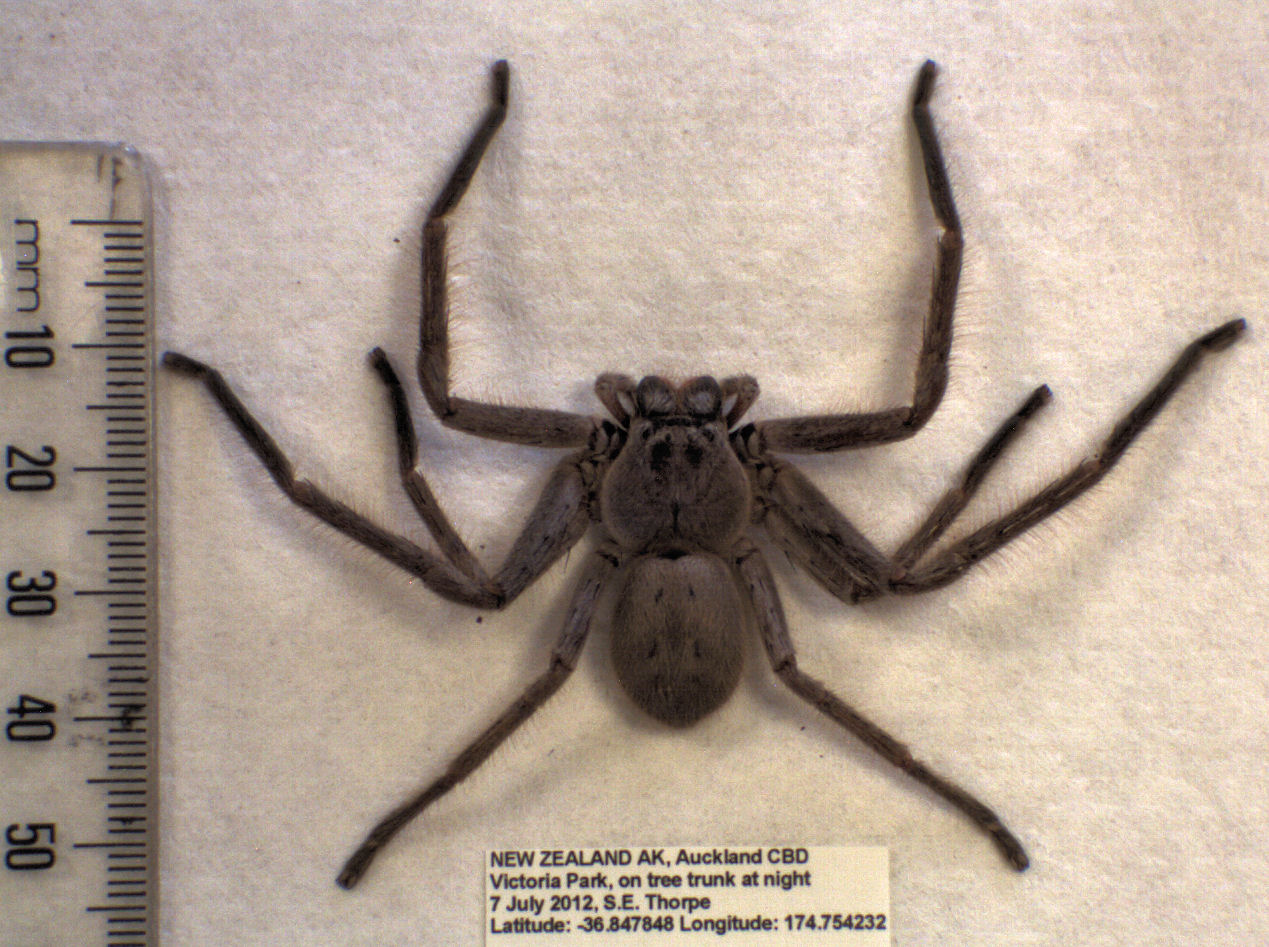
- Isopeda villosa (adult female)

Scientific classification
- Domain: Eukaryota
- Kingdom: Animalia
- Phylum: Arthropoda
- Subphylum: Chelicerata
- Class: Arachnida
- Order: Araneae
- Infraorder: Araneomorphae
- Family: Sparassidae
- Genus: Isopeda
- Species: I. villosa

Binomial name
- Isopeda villosa L. Koch, 1875

= Isopeda villosa =

Species of spider

Isopeda villosa is a species of huntsman spider native to New South Wales, Australia, and established in Auckland, New Zealand. It was first described by Ludwig Carl Christian Koch in 1875.

== Gallery ==
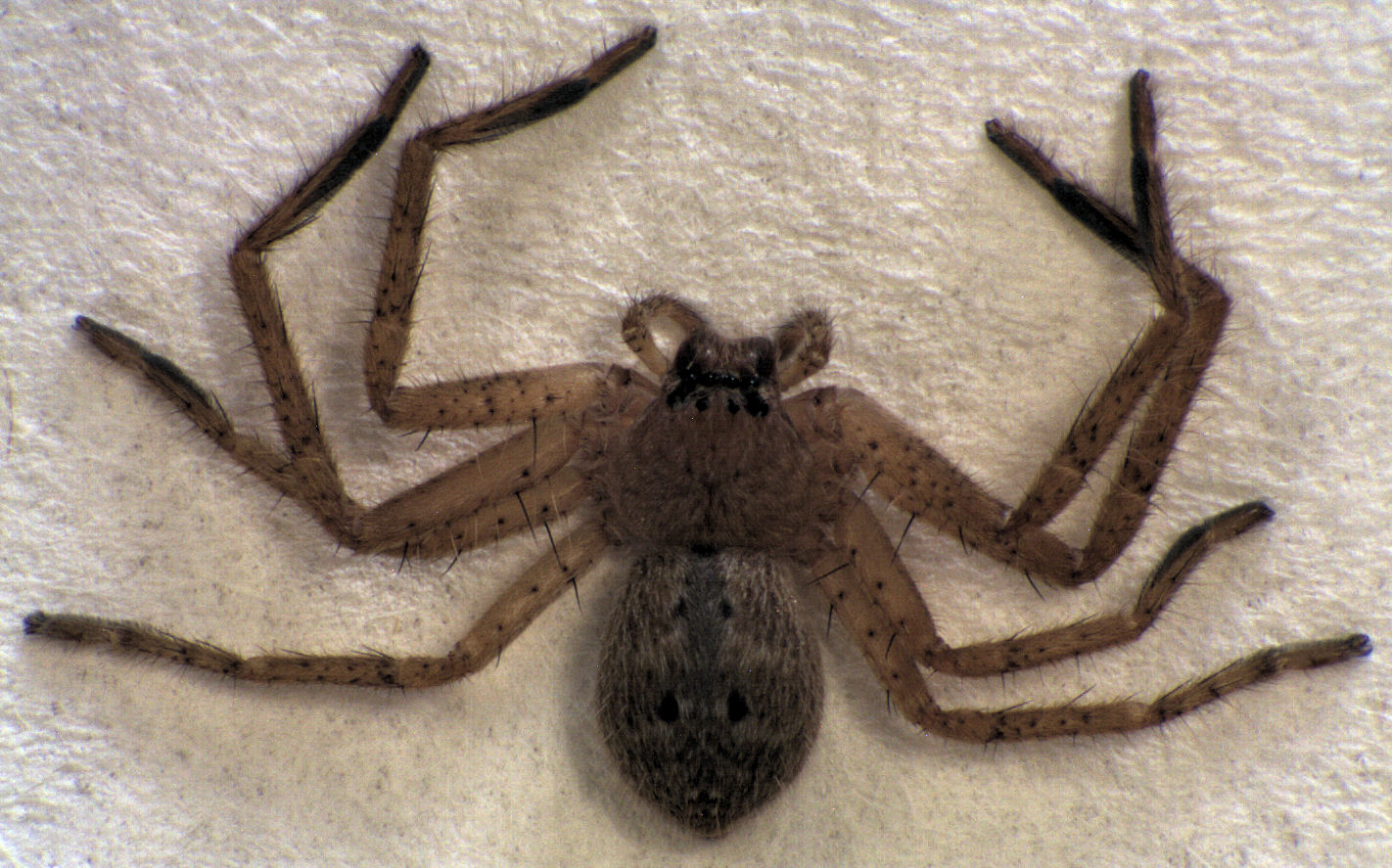
Juvenile I. villosa

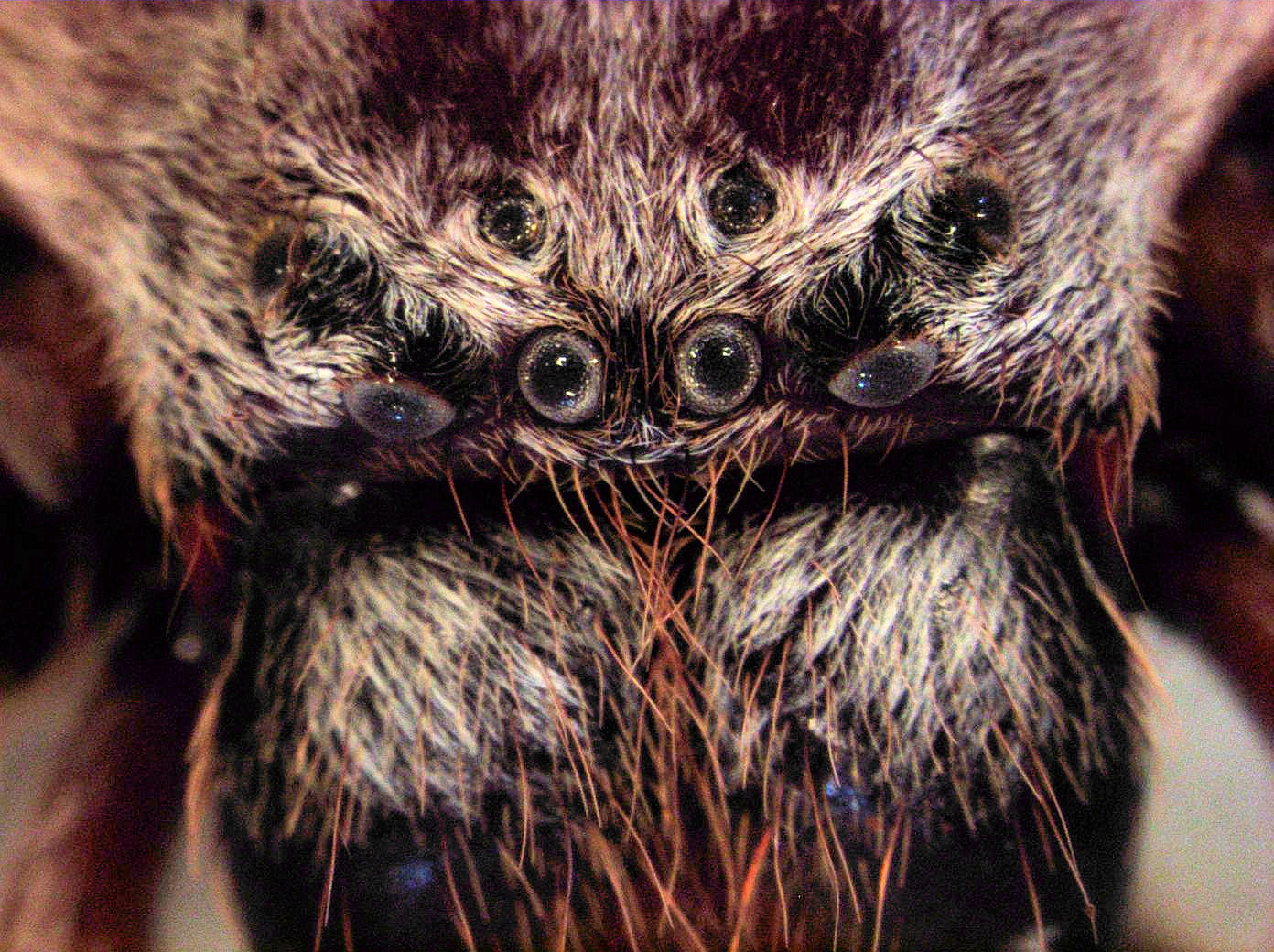
Eyes of female I. villosa, from front

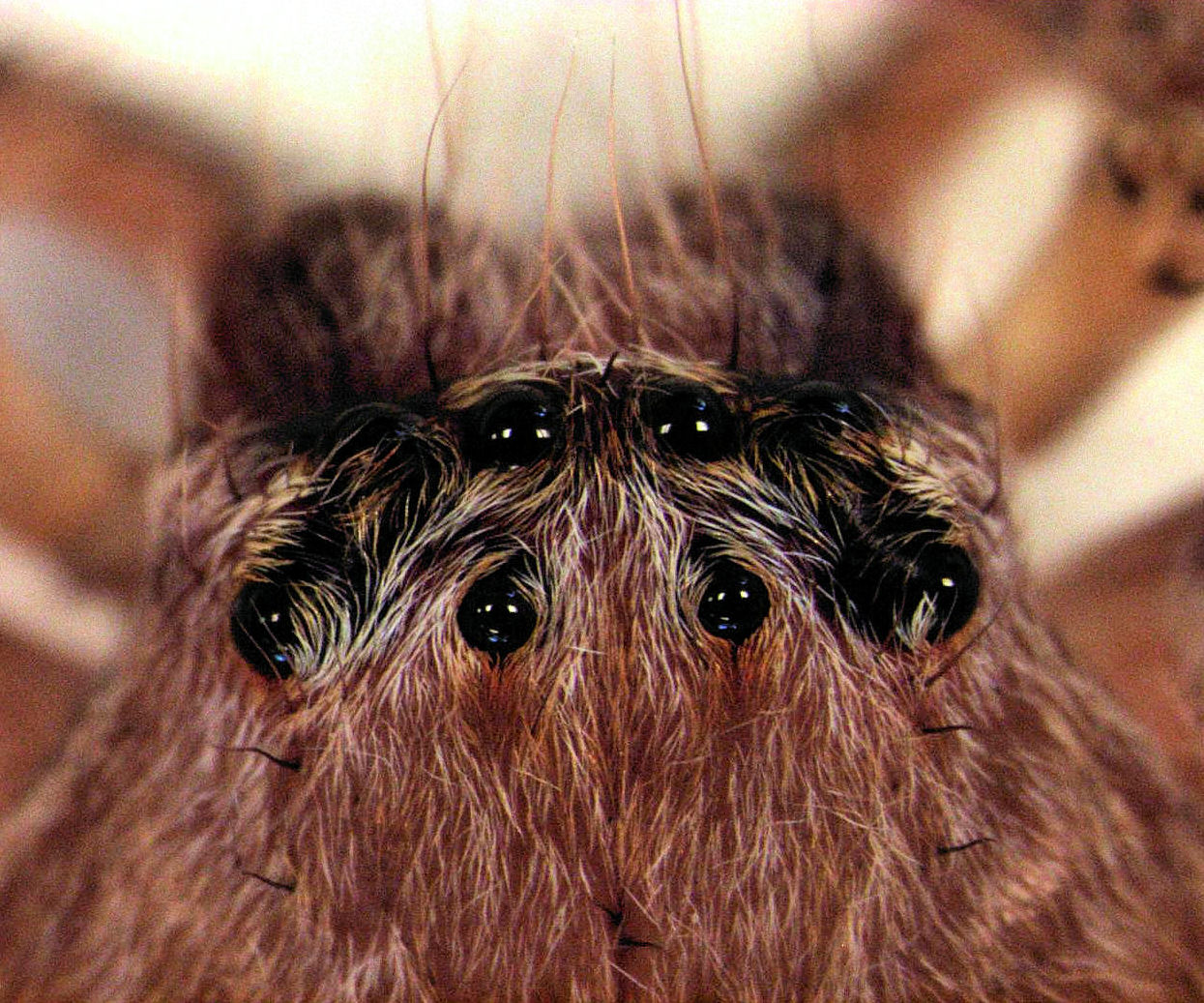
Eyes of juvenile I. villosa, from top

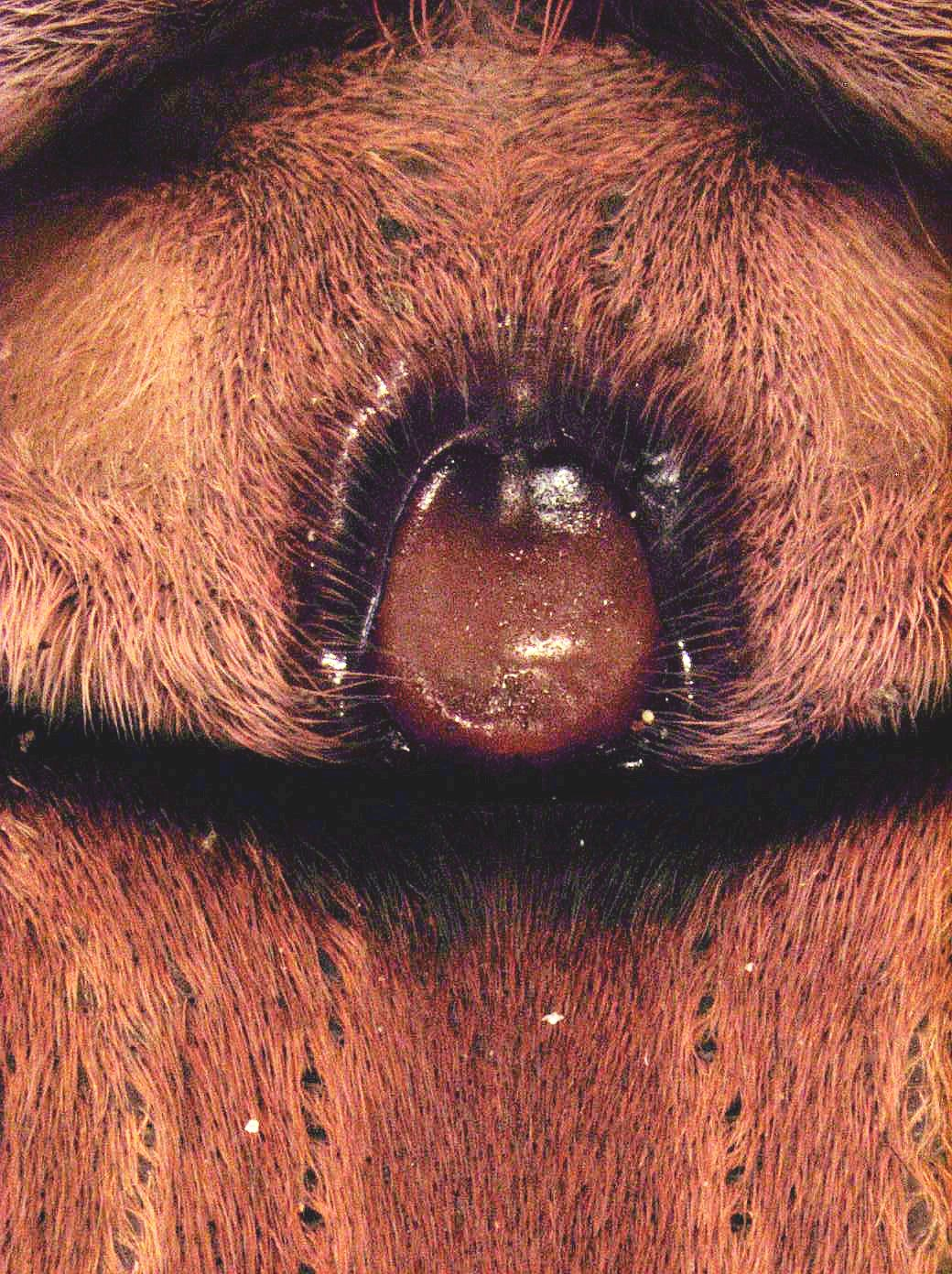
Epigyne of I. villosa

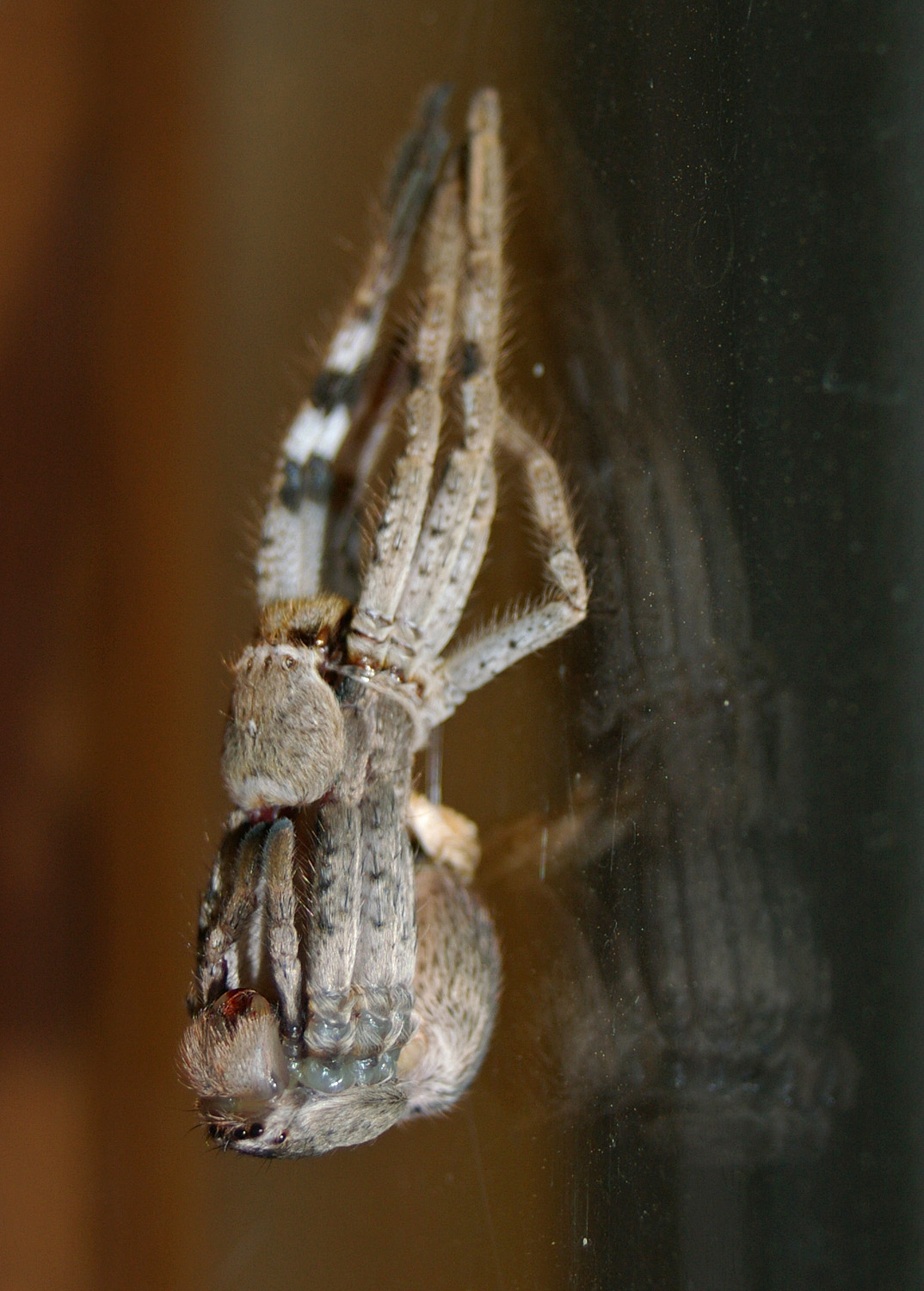
Isopeda villosa discarding its old exoskeleton (1 of 4)

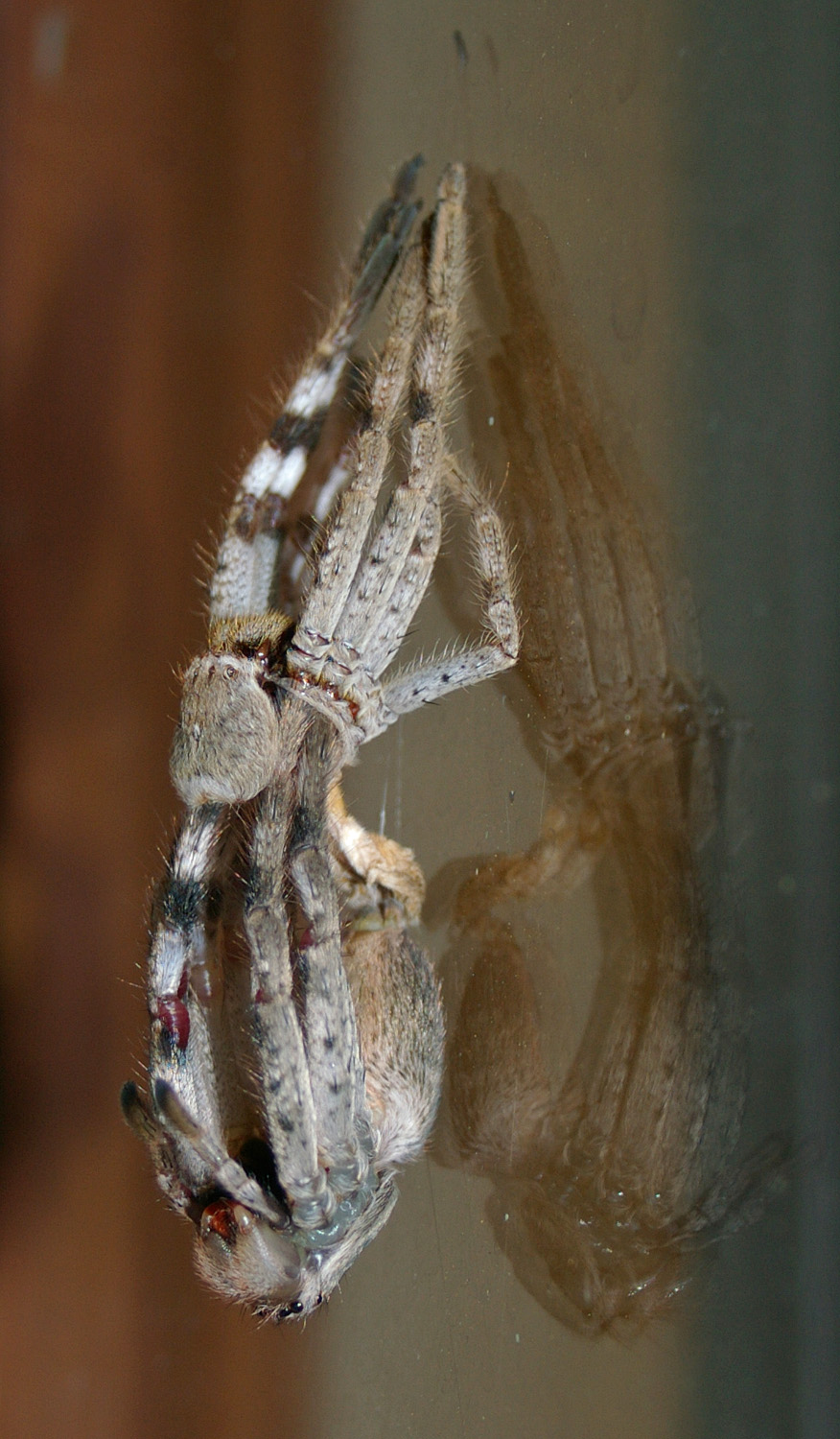
Isopeda villosa discarding its old exoskeleton (2 of 4)

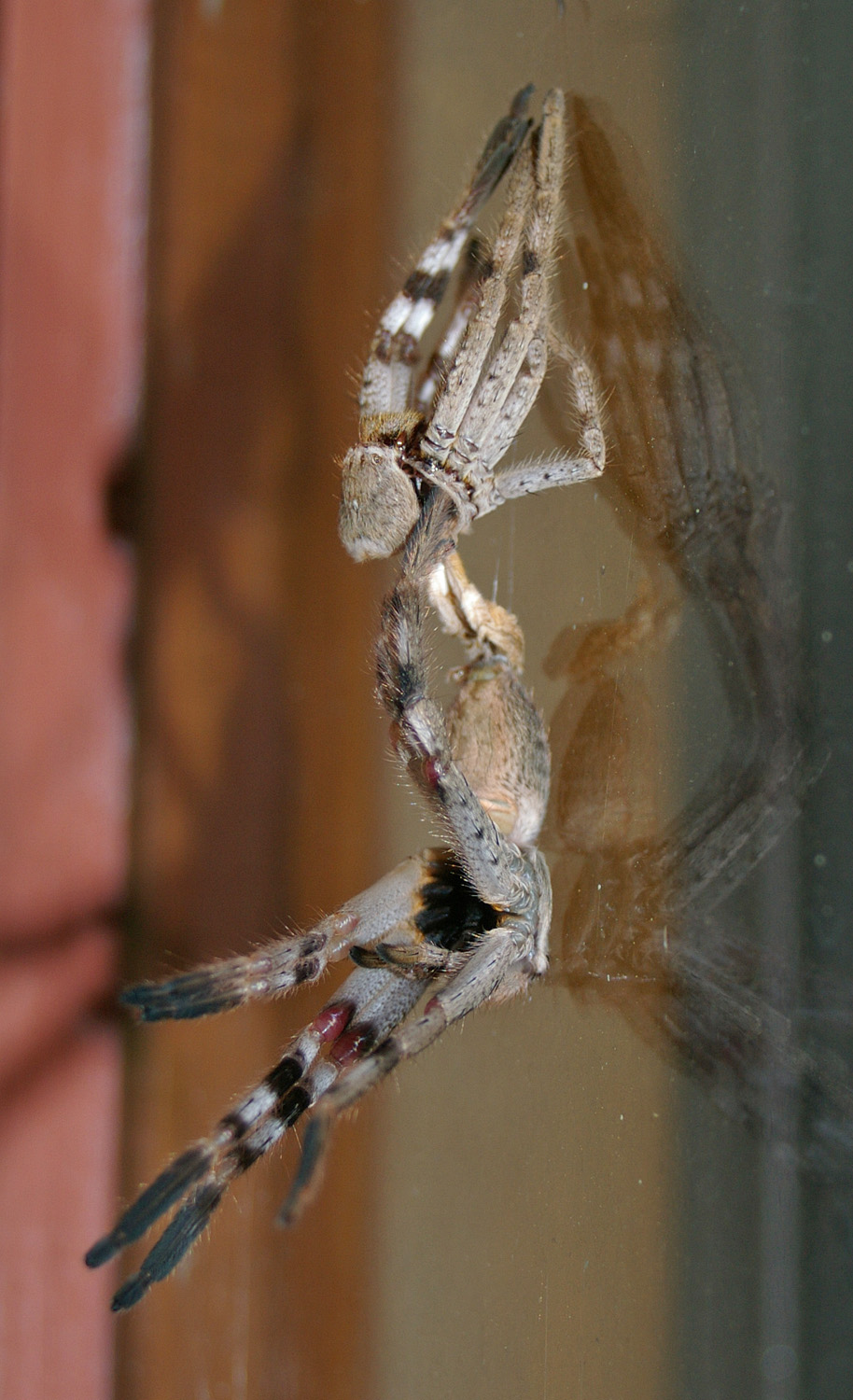
Isopeda villosa discarding its old exoskeleton (3 of 4)

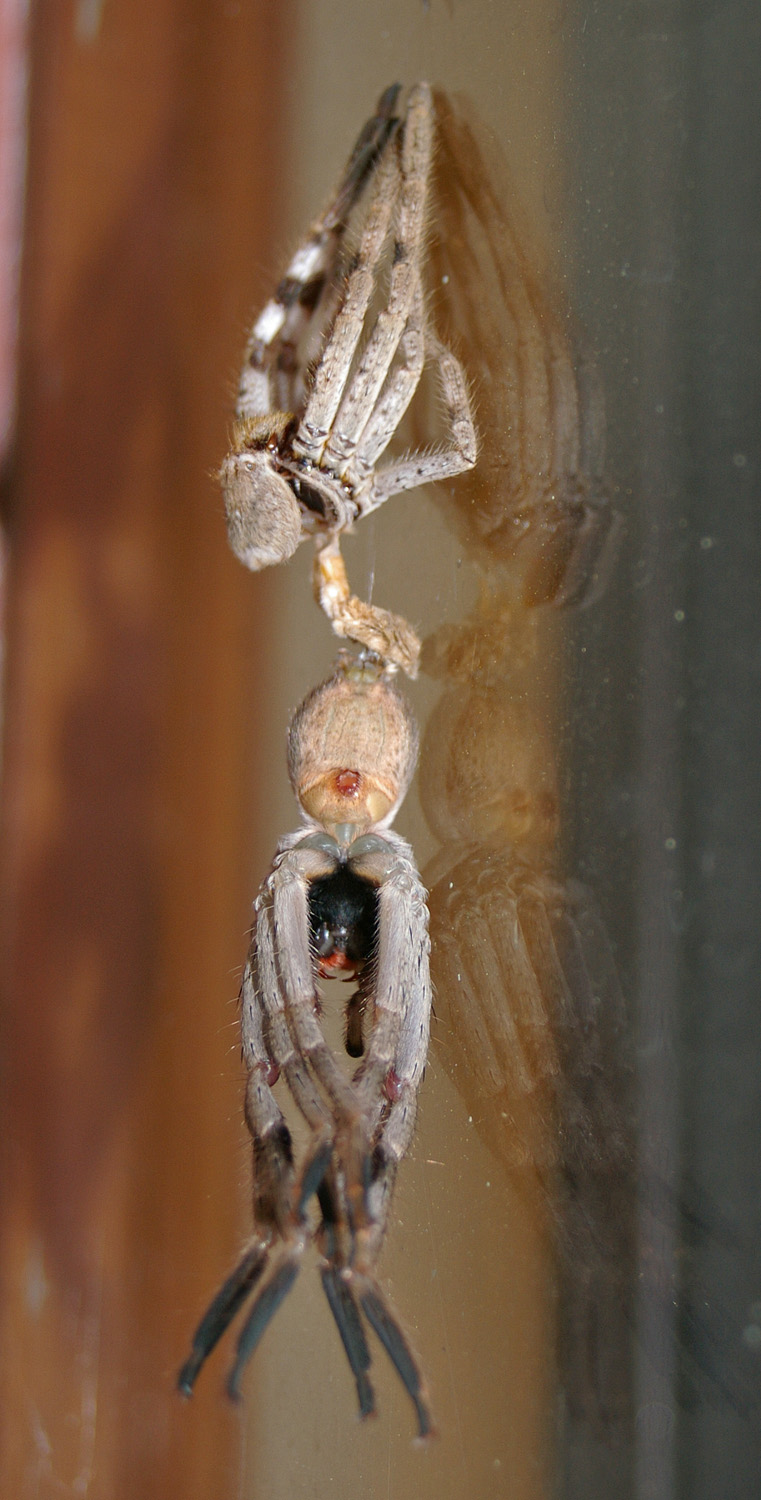
Isopeda villosa discarding its old exoskeleton (4 of 4)
