= Geolycosa missouriensis =

Scientific classification
- Kingdom: Animalia
- Phylum: Arthropoda
- Subphylum: Chelicerata
- Class: Arachnida
- Order: Araneae
- Infraorder: Araneomorphae
- Family: Lycosidae
- Genus: Geolycosa
- Species: G. missouriensis

Binomial name
- Geolycosa missouriensis (Banks, 1895)

Species of wolf spider

Geolycosa missouriensis, the burrowing wolf spider, is a species of wolf spider in the family Lycosidae. It is found in the United States and Canada. They are most active in summer and hunt similar to the trapdoor spiders, lying in wait in their burrows until they sense the arrival of prey through vibrations in the ground.
