= Trabeops =

Scientific classification
- Kingdom: Animalia
- Phylum: Arthropoda
- Subphylum: Chelicerata
- Class: Arachnida
- Order: Araneae
- Infraorder: Araneomorphae
- Family: Lycosidae
- Genus: Trabeops
- Species: T. aurantiacus

Binomial name
- Trabeops aurantiacus (Emerton, 1885)

Genus of spiders

Trabeops is a genus of spiders in the family Lycosidae. It was first described in 1959 by Roewer. As of 2017, it contains only one species, Trabeops aurantiacus, found in the U.S. and Canada.
