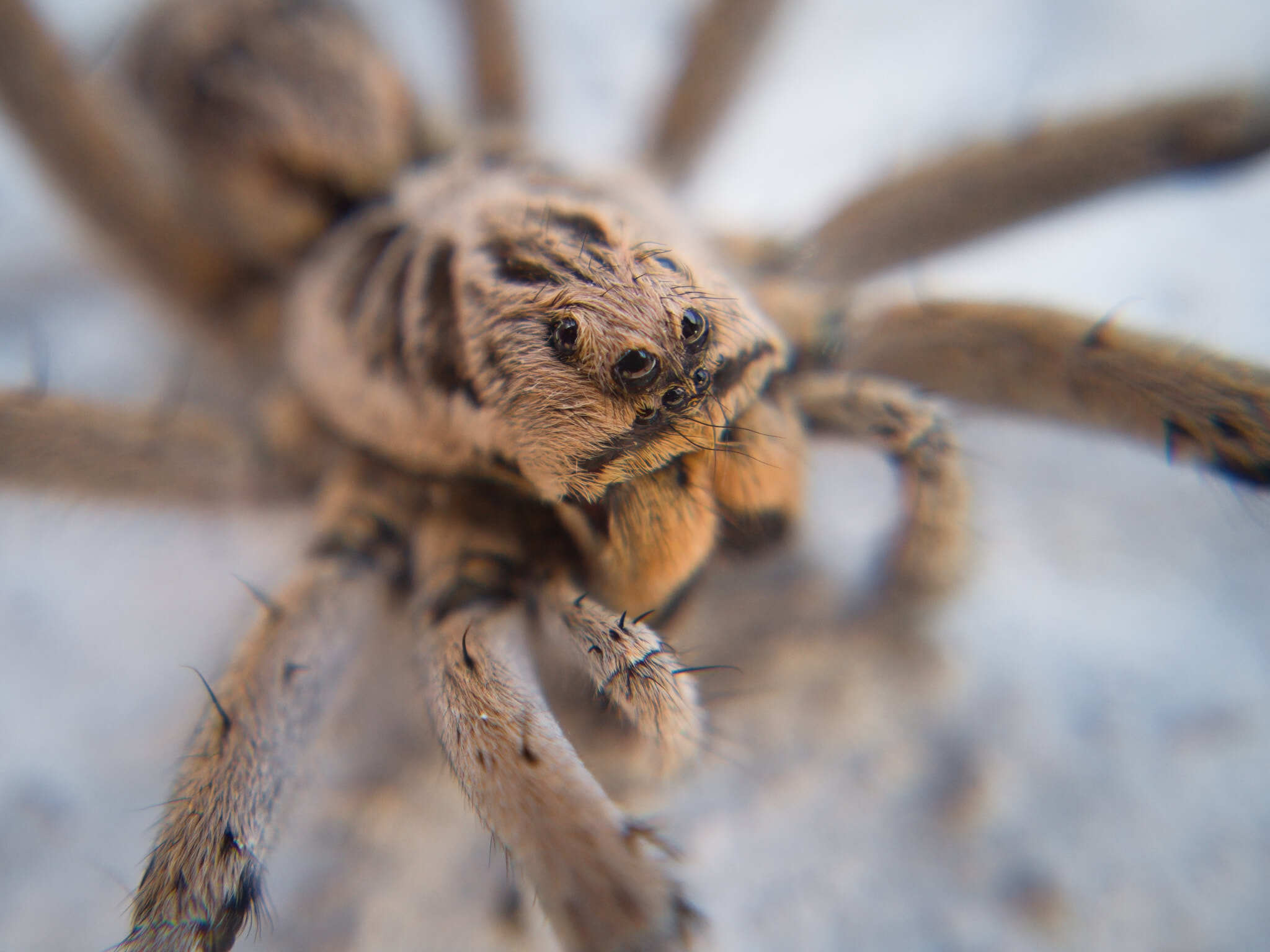
- G. vultuosa
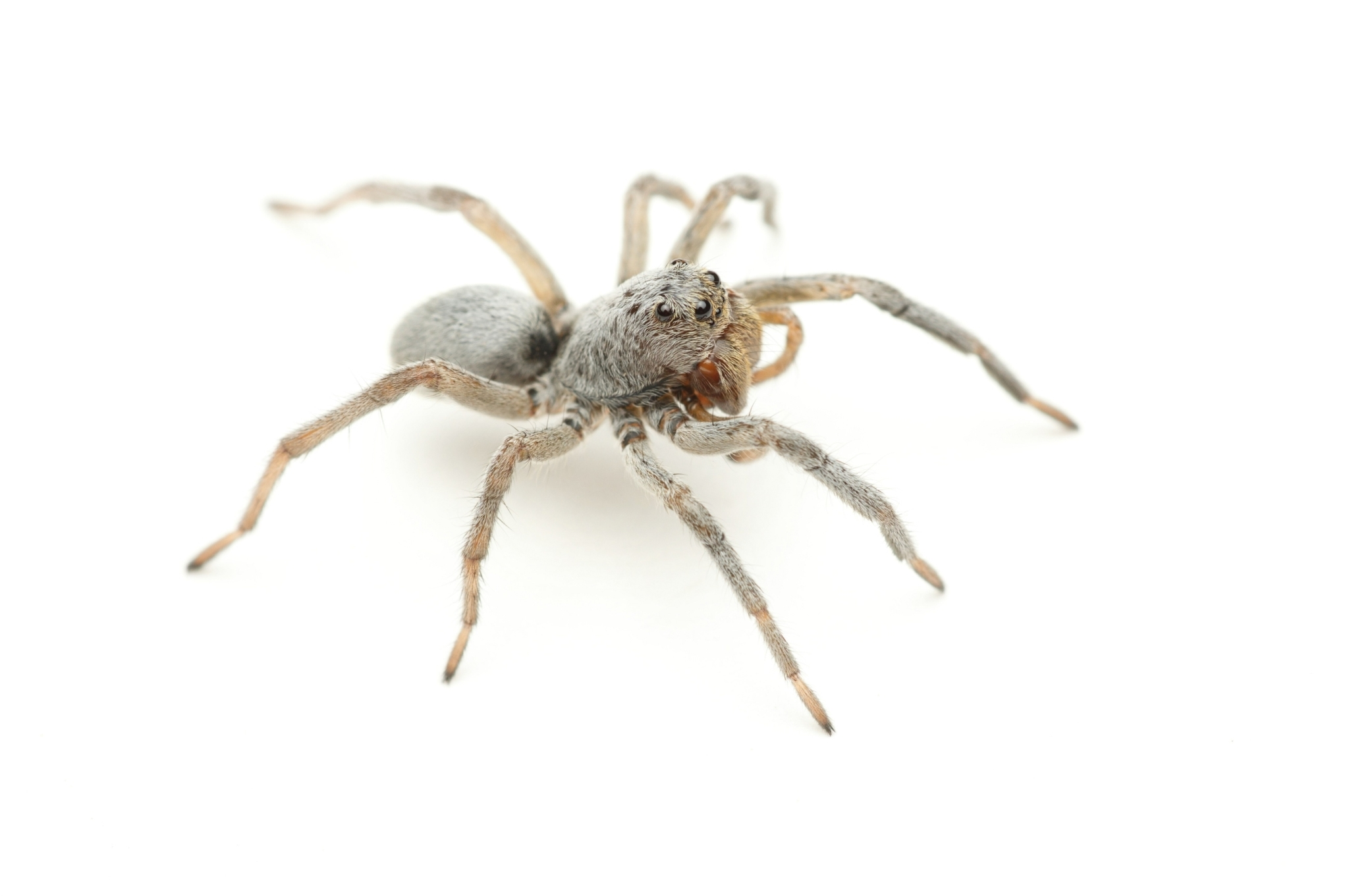
- G. gosoga

Scientific classification
- Kingdom: Animalia
- Phylum: Arthropoda
- Subphylum: Chelicerata
- Class: Arachnida
- Order: Araneae
- Infraorder: Araneomorphae
- Family: Lycosidae
- Genus: Geolycosa; Montgomery, 1904

Species
- 70, see text

Synonyms
- Scaptocosa

= Geolycosa =

Genus of spiders

Geolycosa is a genus of wolf spiders first described in 1904.

== Life style ==
Species of Geolycosa dig deep cylindrical holes in the ground, and some build low turrets with sticks around the opening.

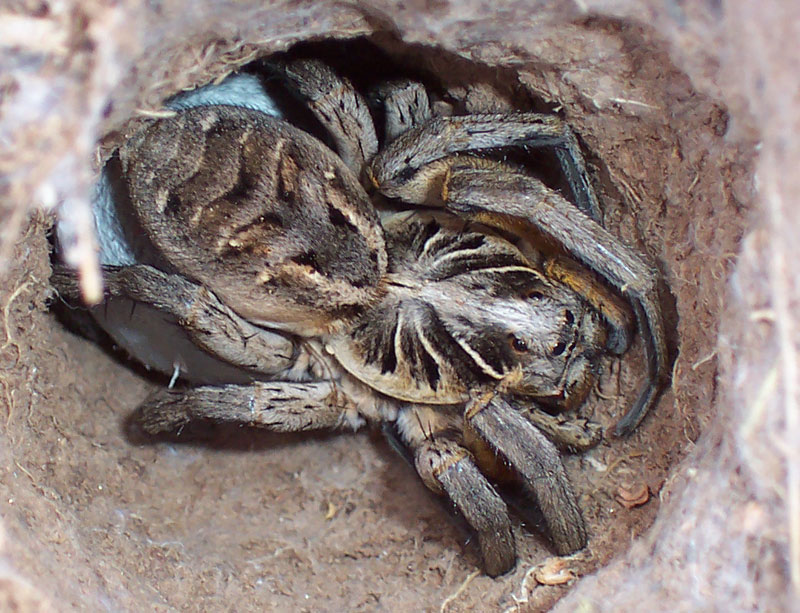
Geolycosa sp. in burrow

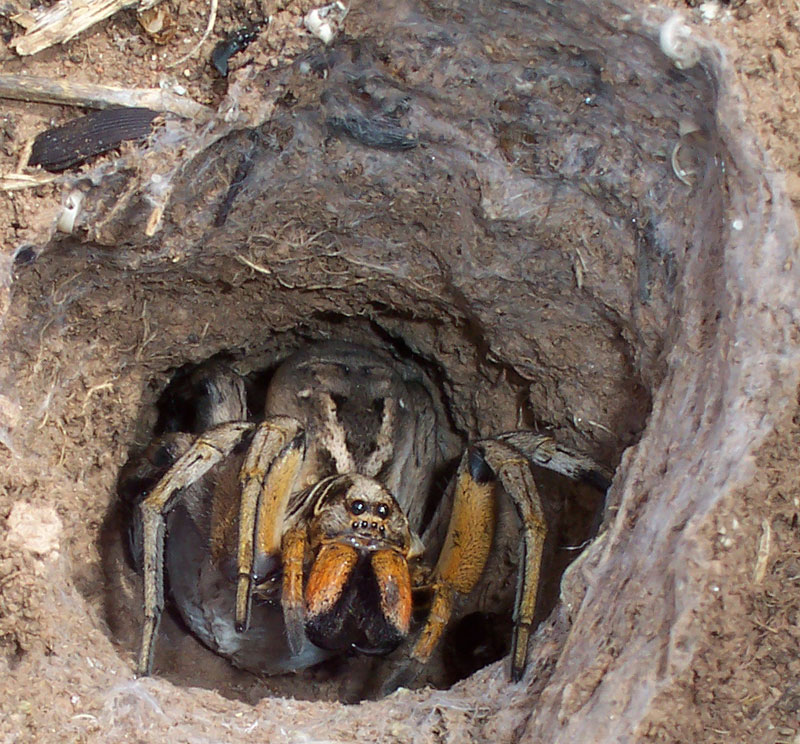

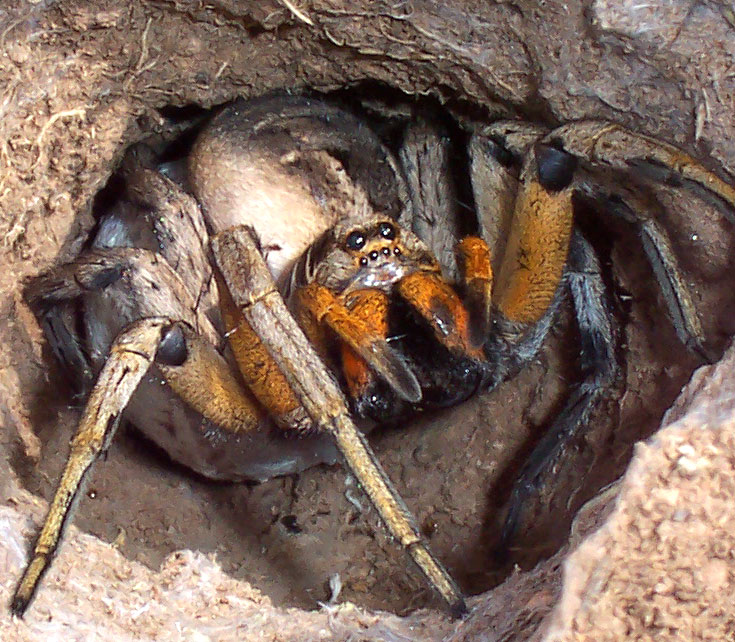

== Description ==
Medium to large spiders characterized by an anteriorly truncated carapace that is highest in the region of the posterior lateral eyes. The lateral sides are steep, and the chelicerae are large, much longer than the clypeus width. The cheliceral furrow bears three teeth. The sternum is longer than wide, and the labium is longer than wide.

The legs are strong, with the front leg being the thickest and strongest. The tarsi and metatarsi have thick scopulae on the last three leg segments.

The epigyne is very small.

== Taxonomy ==
The African species have not been revised.

== Species ==
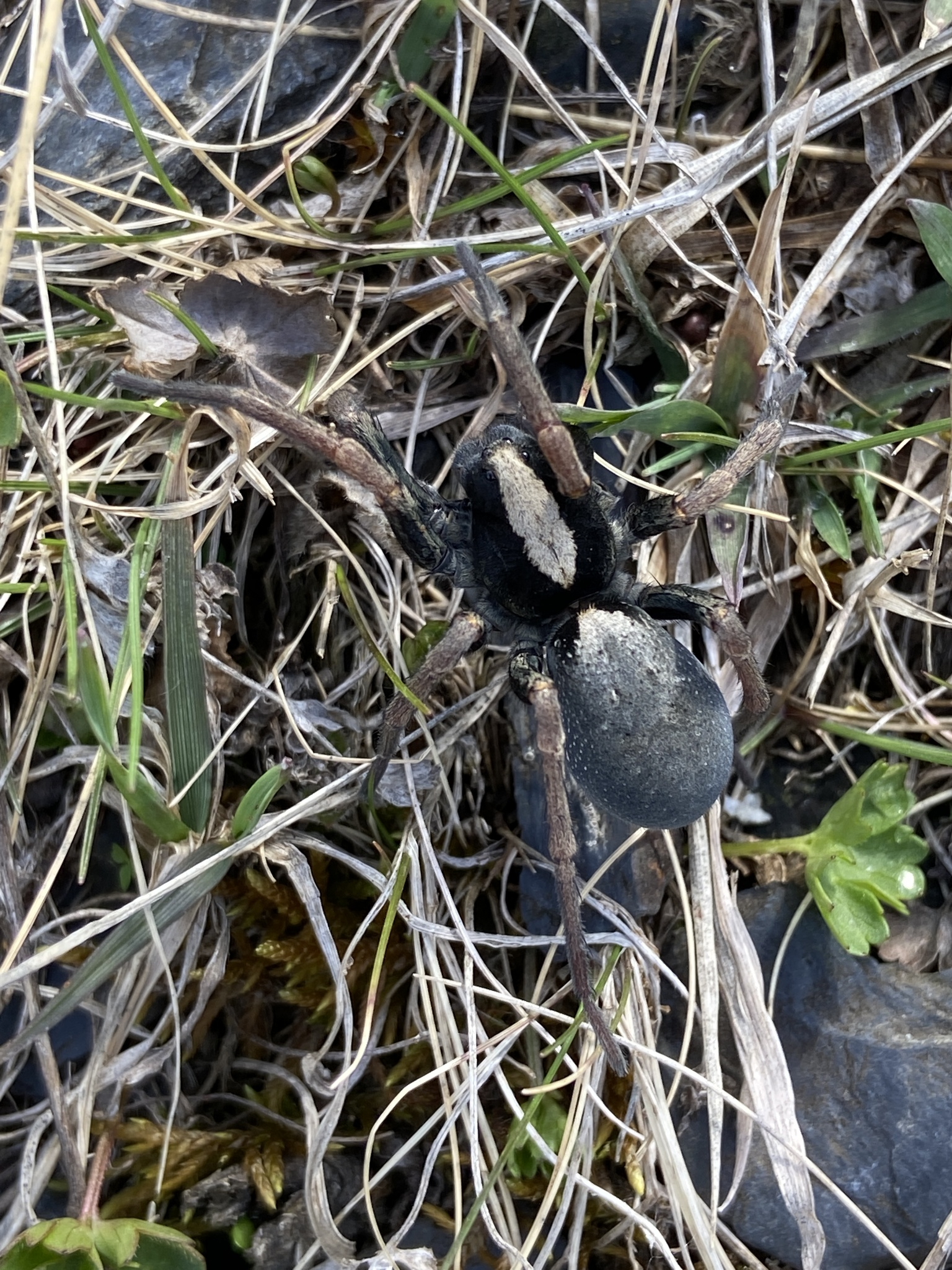
G. charitonovi

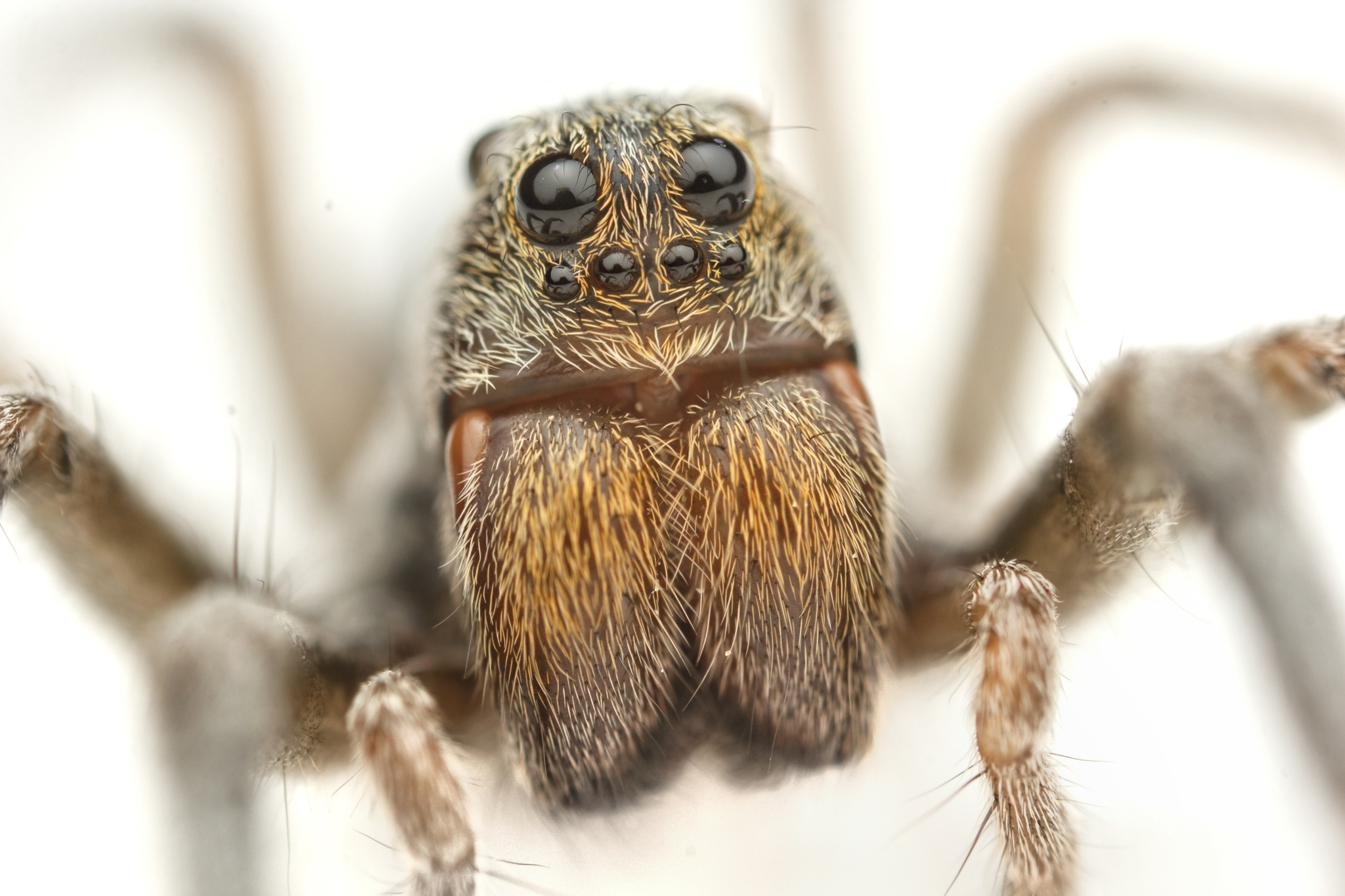
G. gosoga

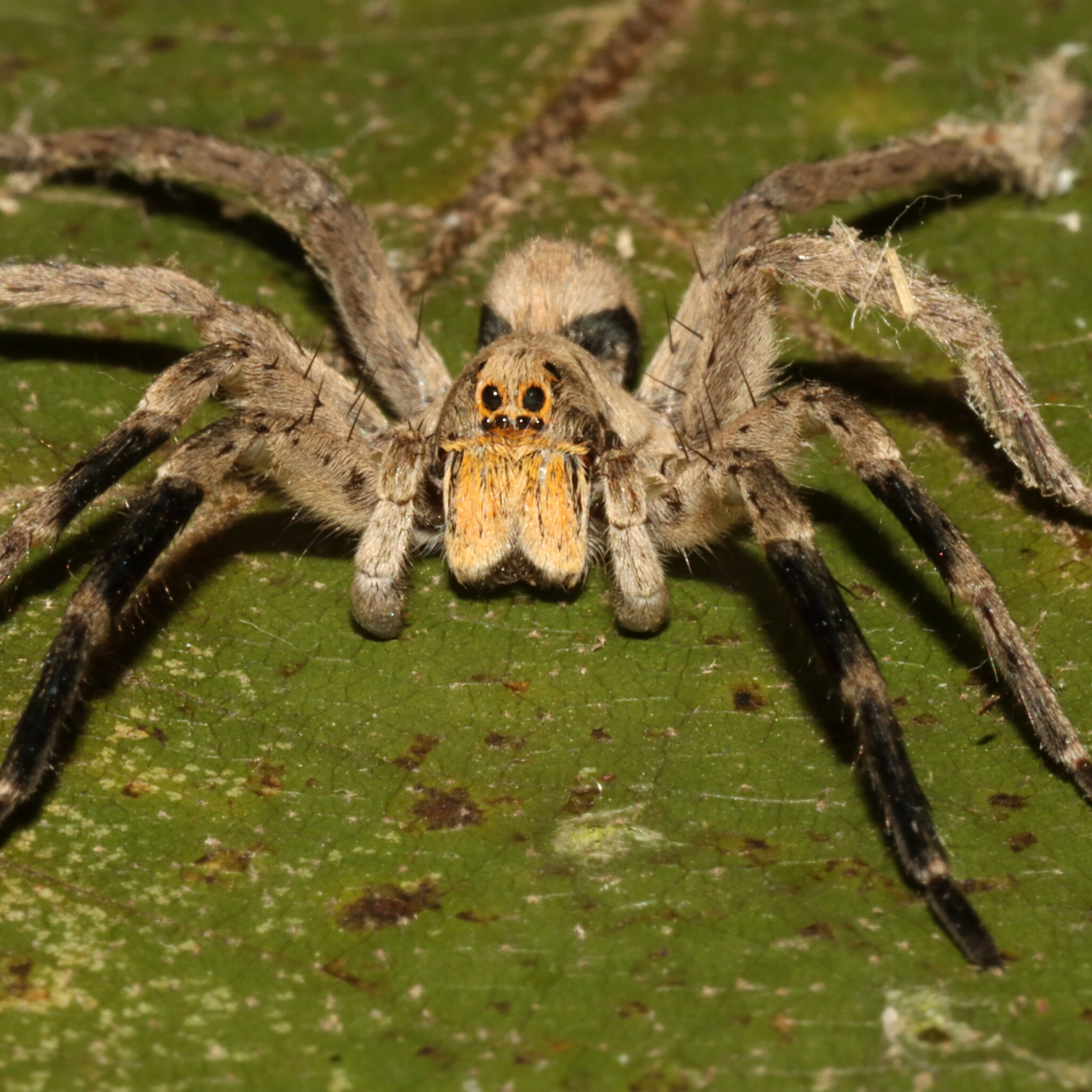
G. missouriensis

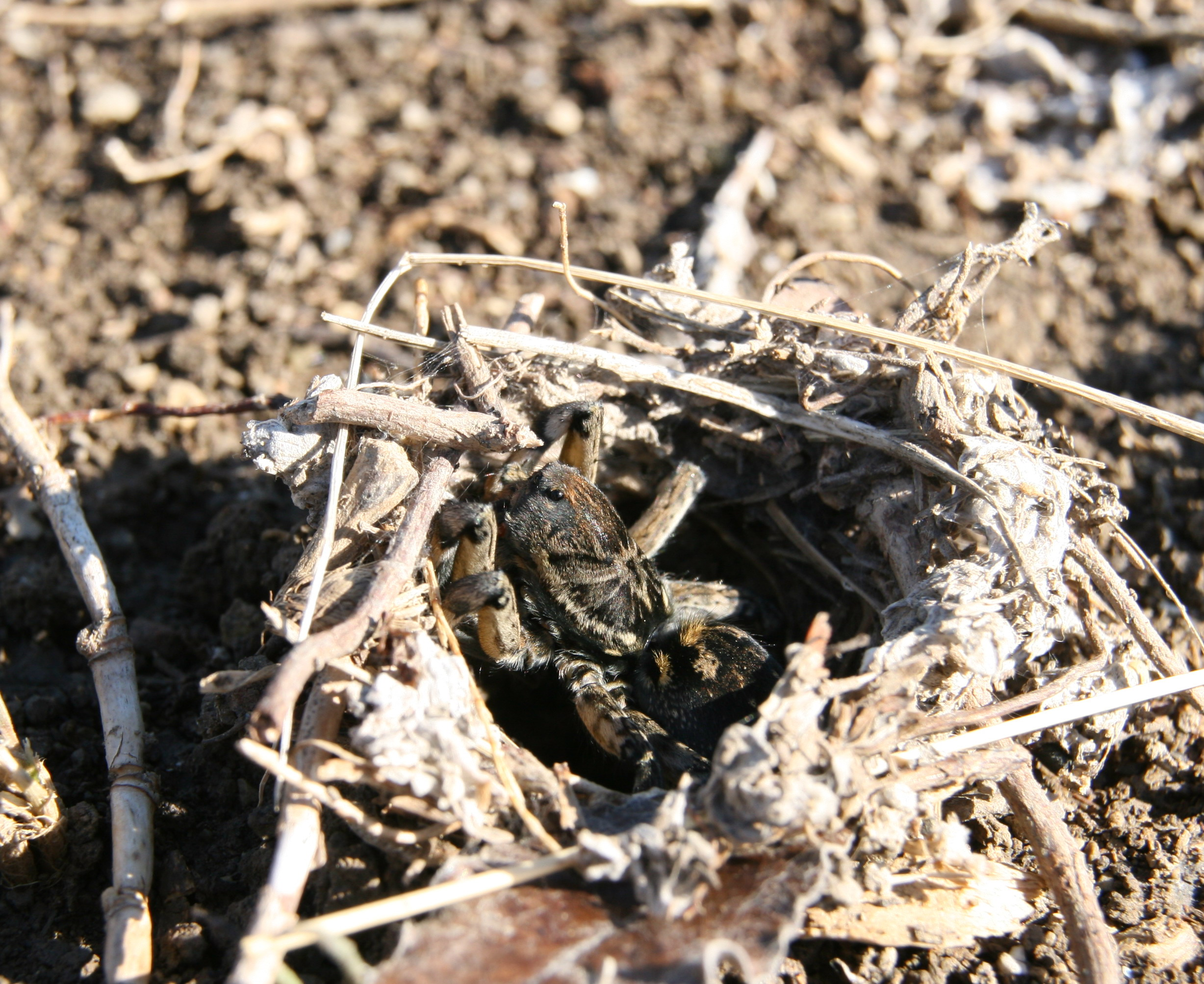
G. vultuosa

As of October 2025, this genus includes seventy species and one subspecies:

- Geolycosa aballicola (Strand, 1906) – Ethiopia
- Geolycosa albimarginata (Badcock, 1932) – Paraguay
- Geolycosa appetens Roewer, 1960 – Namibia
- Geolycosa ashantica (Strand, 1916) – Ghana
- Geolycosa atrosellata Roewer, 1960 – DR Congo
- Geolycosa bridarollii (Mello-Leitão, 1945) – Argentina
- Geolycosa buyebalana Roewer, 1960 – DR Congo
- Geolycosa carli (Reimoser, 1934) – India
- Geolycosa charitonovi (Mcheidze, 1997) – Caucasus (Russia, Georgia, Azerbaijan), India?
- Geolycosa conspersa (Thorell, 1877) – Myanmar, Indonesia (Borneo, Sulawesi)
- Geolycosa cyrenaica (Simon, 1908) – Libya
- Geolycosa diffusa Roewer, 1960 – Cameroon
- Geolycosa disposita Roewer, 1960 – Angola
- Geolycosa diversa Roewer, 1960 – Rwanda
- Geolycosa domifex (Hancock, 1899) – Canada, United States
- Geolycosa dunini Zyuzin & Logunov, 2000 – Georgia, Armenia, Azerbaijan
- Geolycosa egena (L. Koch, 1877) – Australia (Queensland)
- Geolycosa escambiensis Wallace, 1942 – United States
- Geolycosa excussa (Tullgren, 1905) – Bolivia, Argentina
- Geolycosa fatifera (Hentz, 1842) – United States
- Geolycosa festina (L. Koch, 1877) – Australia (Queensland)
- Geolycosa forsaythi (Dahl, 1908) – Papua New Guinea (Bismarck Arch.)
- Geolycosa gaerdesi Roewer, 1960 – Namibia
- Geolycosa gosoga (Chamberlin, 1925) – United States
- Geolycosa habilis Roewer, 1960 – DR Congo, Rwanda, Tanzania
- Geolycosa hectoria (Pocock, 1900) – South Africa
- Geolycosa hubbelli Wallace, 1942 – United States
- Geolycosa hyltonscottae (Mello-Leitão, 1941) – Argentina
- Geolycosa impudica (Mello-Leitão, 1944) – Argentina
- Geolycosa incertula (Mello-Leitão, 1941) – Argentina
- Geolycosa infensa (L. Koch, 1877) – Australia (Queensland, New South Wales)
- Geolycosa insulata (Mello-Leitão, 1944) – Argentina
- Geolycosa ituricola (Strand, 1913) – DR Congo
- Geolycosa katekeana Roewer, 1960 – DR Congo
- Geolycosa kijabica (Strand, 1916) – Kenya
- Geolycosa lancearia (Mello-Leitão, 1940) – Argentina
- Geolycosa latifrons Montgomery, 1904 – United States (type species)
- Geolycosa liberiana Roewer, 1960 – Liberia
- Geolycosa lindneri (Karsch, 1879) – Angola
- Geolycosa lusingana (Roewer, 1959) – DR Congo
- Geolycosa micanopy Wallace, 1942 – United States
- Geolycosa minor (Simon, 1909) – Equatorial Guinea (Bioko)
- Geolycosa missouriensis (Banks, 1895) – Canada, United States
- Geolycosa natalensis Roewer, 1960 – South Africa
- Geolycosa nolotthensis (Simon, 1910) – Namibia, South Africa
- Geolycosa ornatipes (Bryant, 1935) – United States
- Geolycosa patellonigra Wallace, 1942 – United States
- Geolycosa pikei (Marx, 1881) – United States
- Geolycosa rafaelana (Chamberlin, 1928) – United States
- Geolycosa raptatorides (Strand, 1909) – Uruguay
- Geolycosa riograndae Wallace, 1942 – United States
- Geolycosa rogersi Wallace, 1942 – United States
- Geolycosa rubrotaeniata (Keyserling, 1877) – Colombia
- Geolycosa rufibarbis (Mello-Leitão, 1947) – Brazil
- Geolycosa sangilia (Roewer, 1955) – Colombia
- Geolycosa schulzi (Dahl, 1908) – Papua New Guinea (Bismarck Arch.)
- Geolycosa sexmaculata Roewer, 1960 – Afghanistan
- Geolycosa shinkuluna Roewer, 1960 – DR Congo
- Geolycosa suahela (Strand, 1913) – DR Congo
- Geolycosa subvittata (Pocock, 1900) – South Africa
- Geolycosa tangana (Roewer, 1959) – Tanzania
- Geolycosa ternetzi (Mello-Leitão, 1939) – Paraguay
- Geolycosa timorensis (Thorell, 1881) – Timor
- Geolycosa togonia Roewer, 1960 – Togo
- Geolycosa turricola (Treat, 1880) – United States
- Geolycosa uinticolens (Chamberlin, 1936) – United States
- Geolycosa uruguayaca (Strand, 1909) – Uruguay
- Geolycosa vultuosa (C. L. Koch, 1838) – Slovakia, Hungary, south-eastern and eastern Europe, Turkey, Caucasus, Israel, Syria, Iran
- Geolycosa wrighti (Emerton, 1912) – Canada, United States
- Geolycosa xera McCrone, 1963 – United States
  - G. x. archboldi McCrone, 1963 – United States
