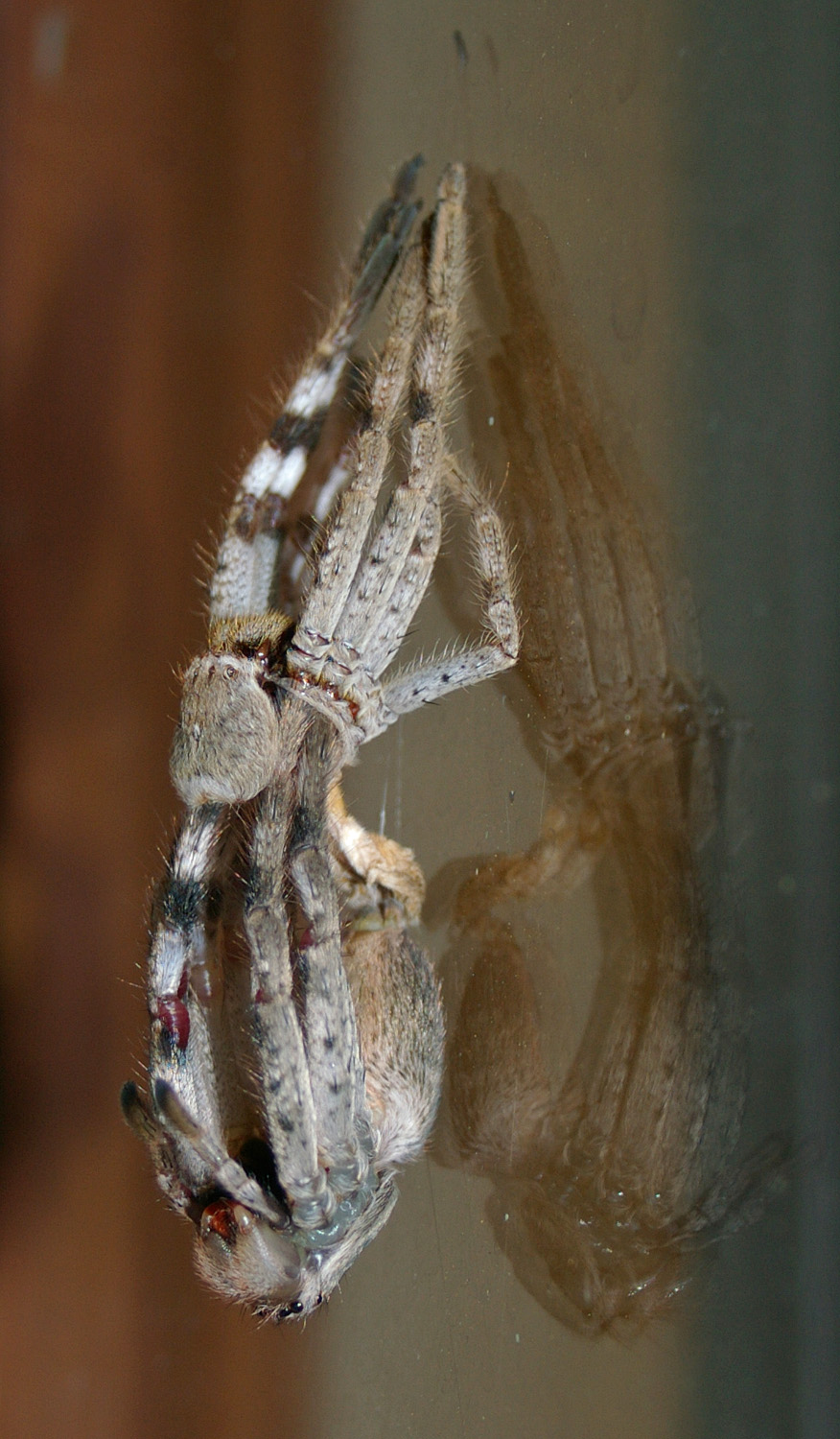
- Isopeda villosa discarding its old exoskeleton
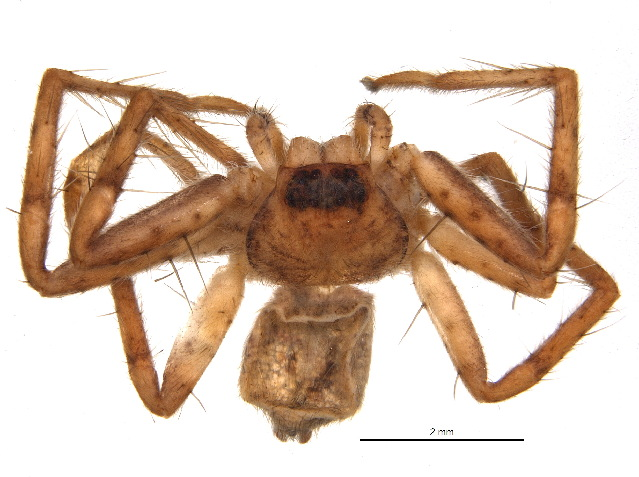
- I. vasta

Scientific classification
- Kingdom: Animalia
- Phylum: Arthropoda
- Subphylum: Chelicerata
- Class: Arachnida
- Order: Araneae
- Infraorder: Araneomorphae
- Family: Sparassidae
- Genus: Isopeda; L. Koch, 1875

Type species
- I. vasta (L. Koch, 1867)

Species
- 19, see text

= Isopeda =

Genus of spiders

Isopeda is a genus of huntsman spiders that was first described by Ludwig Carl Christian Koch in 1875.

== Species ==
As of September 2022 it contains nineteen species and one subspecies, found in Papua New Guinea, Australia, the Philippines, and on New Caledonia:

- Isopeda alpina Hirst, 1992 – Australia (New South Wales, Victoria)
- Isopeda binnaburra Hirst, 1992 – Australia (Queensland)
- Isopeda brachyseta Hirst, 1992 – Australia (New South Wales)
- Isopeda canberrana Hirst, 1992 – Australia (New South Wales, Victoria)
- Isopeda catmona Barrion & Litsinger, 1995 – Philippines
- Isopeda deianira (Thorell, 1881) – New Guinea
- Isopeda echuca Hirst, 1992 – Australia (New South Wales, Victoria)
- Isopeda girraween Hirst, 1992 – Australia (Queensland)
- Isopeda leishmanni Hogg, 1903 – Australia (Western Australia, South Australia, Victoria)
  - Isopeda l. hoggi Simon, 1908 – Australia (Western Australia)
- Isopeda magna Hirst, 1992 – Australia (Western Australia, South Australia)
- Isopeda montana Hogg, 1903 – Australia (South Australia, Victoria)
- Isopeda neocaledonica Berland, 1924 – New Caledonia
- Isopeda parnabyi Hirst, 1992 – Australia (Queensland, New South Wales)
- Isopeda prolata Hirst, 1992 – Australia (New South Wales, Victoria)
- Isopeda queenslandensis Hirst, 1992 – Australia (Queensland, New South Wales)
- Isopeda subalpina Hirst, 1992 – Australia (Victoria)
- Isopeda vasta (L. Koch, 1867) (type) – Australia (Queensland)
- Isopeda villosa L. Koch, 1875 – Australia (New South Wales)
- Isopeda woodwardi Hogg, 1903 – Australia (South Australia)

In synonymy:

- I. conspersula Strand, 1913 = Isopeda vasta (L. Koch, 1867)
- I. pengellya Hogg, 1903 = Isopeda leishmanni Hogg, 1903
