= Geolycosa pikei =

Scientific classification
- Kingdom: Animalia
- Phylum: Arthropoda
- Subphylum: Chelicerata
- Class: Arachnida
- Order: Araneae
- Infraorder: Araneomorphae
- Family: Lycosidae
- Genus: Geolycosa
- Species: G. pikei

Binomial name
- Geolycosa pikei (Marx, 1881)

Species of spider

Geolycosa pikei is a species of wolf spider in the family Lycosidae from the United States. It can blend into sand, which it also burrows in. The spider can heal its wounds quickly.

== Description ==
The spider is sandy gray to brown with black markings. Females are 18 to 22 mm (0.71 to 0.87 in) in length and males are about 14 mm (0.55 in) long. As a result of its color, it is hard to see the spider on sand until it starts moving. The spider hunts at dusk by running quickly over the sand to prey on insects.

During the day, the spider stays in its hole unless prey comes too close. Its hole can be up to the diameter of a knitting needle and goes through the sand from a few inches to 2 feet (0.61 m). In order to stop the hole from caving in, the spider spins a silken lining around the upper 2–3 inches (51–76 mm) of the hole. The hole is typically built at night with the spider throwing little bits of sand. Its hole is usually built in sand near the seashore, but the holes have also been found inland. The hole is similar to that of a tiger beetle's, but it is larger. The young spiders build holes just as well as the adults. They are found in the United States.

== Studies ==
A 1981 study by the Canadian Journal of Zoology showed that when a wound is made in the spider's abdomen, it is immediately secured with a hemolymph coagulum. As time went by, the external coagulum sealed the hole in the exoskeleton and the internal part turned into a fibrous mass. After multiple changes, the spider's tissue was restored.
