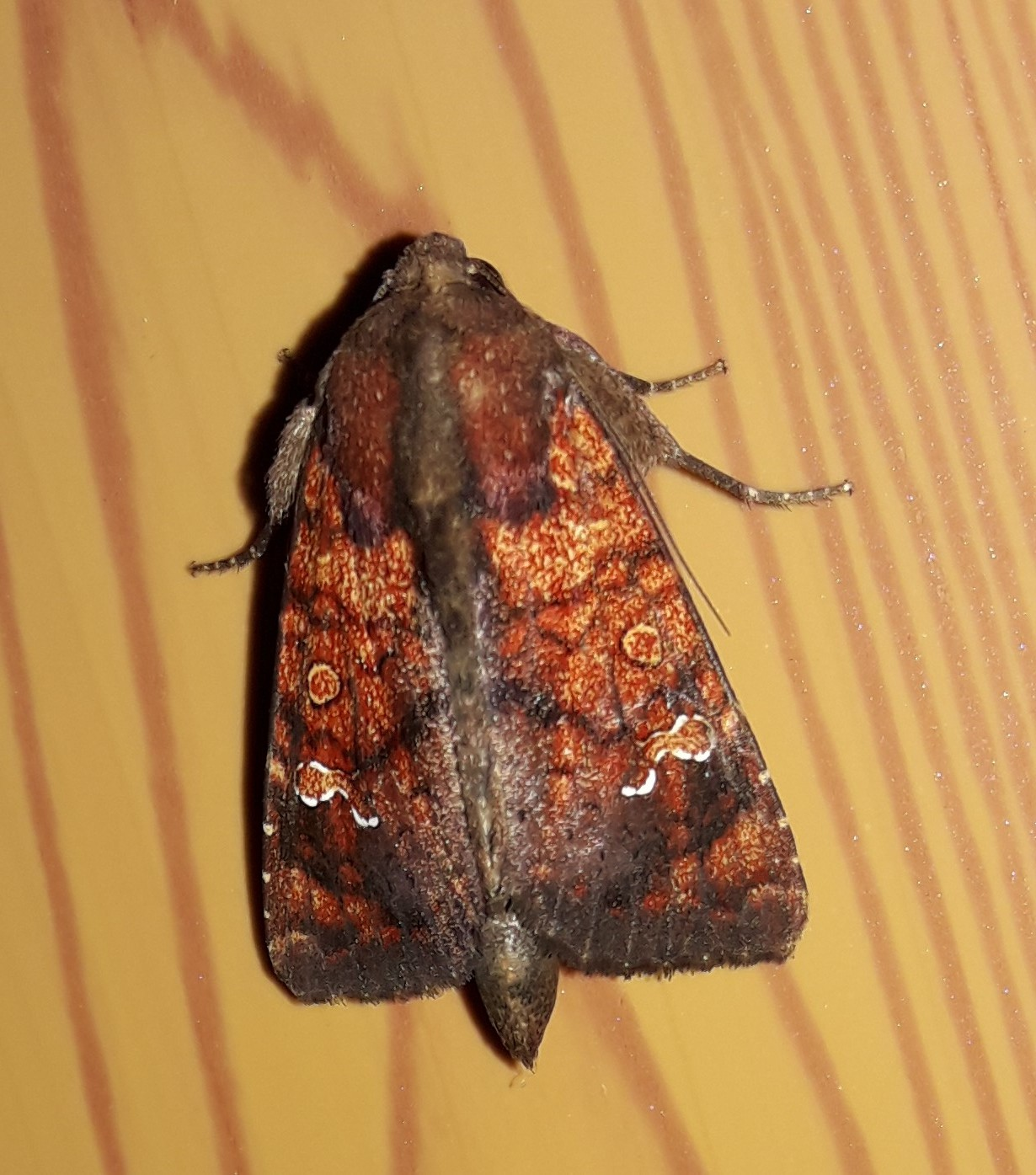
- Eriopyga ditissima

Scientific classification
- Kingdom: Animalia
- Phylum: Arthropoda
- Clade: Pancrustacea
- Class: Insecta
- Order: Lepidoptera
- Superfamily: Noctuoidea
- Family: Noctuidae
- Genus: Eriopyga; Guenée in Boisduval & Guenée, 1852

Species
- See text

= Eriopyga =

Genus of moths

Eriopyga is a genus of moths in the family Noctuidae. The genus was erected by Achille Guenée in 1852.

== Species ==
The genus includes the following species:

- Eriopyga adjuntasa Schaus, 1940
- Eriopyga adonea (Druce, 1898)
- Eriopyga advena Draudt, 1924
- Eriopyga aenescans Dognin, 1916
- Eriopyga albipuncta (Schaus, 1894)
- Eriopyga albitorna Draudt, 1924
- Eriopyga albulirena Dognin, 1914
- Eriopyga approximans E. D. Jones, 1908
- Eriopyga atrisignata E. D. Jones, 1908
- Eriopyga augur Zerny, 1916
- Eriopyga azucara (Schaus, 1903)
- Eriopyga baruna (Schaus, 1898)
- Eriopyga bothorodes Dyar, 1914
- Eriopyga brachia de Joannis, 1904
- Eriopyga cacoena Dyar, 1918
- Eriopyga cillutincarae Zerny, 1916
- Eriopyga complexens Dyar, 1916
- Eriopyga condensa Dyar, 1910
- Eriopyga confluens Hampson, 1905
- Eriopyga contempta (Schaus, 1894)
- Eriopyga crista (Walker, 1856)
- Eriopyga croceifimbria Draudt, 1924
- Eriopyga crocosticta (Schaus, 1903)
- Eriopyga cupreola Draudt, 1924
- Eriopyga cymax Dyar, 1912
- Eriopyga descolei Köhler, 1947
- Eriopyga desiota Dyar, 1916
- Eriopyga diplopis Dyar, 1914
- Eriopyga ditissima (Walker, 1857)
- Eriopyga dyari Draudt, 1924
- Eriopyga dyschoroides (Schaus, 1898)
- Eriopyga eccarsia Dyar, 1914
- Eriopyga epipsilina Draudt, 1924
- Eriopyga erythropis Hampson, 1909
- Eriopyga euchroa Hampson, 1911
- Eriopyga eugrapha Hampson, 1913
- Eriopyga evanida Schaus, 1911
- Eriopyga excavata Hampson, 1905
- Eriopyga fea (Druce, 1889)
- Eriopyga flammans Dognin, 1907
- Eriopyga flavirufa Hampson, 1909
- Eriopyga friburgensis (Guenée, 1852)
- Eriopyga fulvida Druce, 1905
- Eriopyga fuscescens Draudt, 1924
- Eriopyga glacistis Hampson, 1905
- Eriopyga glaucopis Hampson, 1909
- Eriopyga griseirena Schaus, 1906
- Eriopyga griseorufa Druce, 1908
- Eriopyga ignita E. D. Jones, 1915
- Eriopyga infelix Dyar, 1910
- Eriopyga iridescens Draudt, 1924
- Eriopyga janeira (Schaus, 1898)
- Eriopyga lactipex Dognin, 1914
- Eriopyga lathen Dyar, 1927
- Eriopyga leucocraspis Dognin, 1916
- Eriopyga lilacea Köhler, 1947
- Eriopyga limonis Schaus, 1911
- Eriopyga lindigi (Felder & Rogenhofer, 1874)
- Eriopyga lubrica Dognin, 1914
- Eriopyga lycophotia E. D. Jones, 1915
- Eriopyga macrolepia Hampson, 1905
- Eriopyga magnifica Zerny, 1916
- Eriopyga magniorbis Dognin, 1914
- Eriopyga magnirena Dognin, 1914
- Eriopyga marginalis (Schaus, 1903)
- Eriopyga mediorufa (Schaus, 1903)
- Eriopyga melaleuca Druce, 1908
- Eriopyga melanogaster (Guenée, 1852)
- Eriopyga melanosigma Hampson, 1909
- Eriopyga melanosticta Hampson, 1905
- Eriopyga mesostrigata Hampson, 1905
- Eriopyga metanensis Köhler, 1947
- Eriopyga milio Dyar, 1916
- Eriopyga moesta (Walker, 1858)
- Eriopyga moneti Schaus, 1911
- Eriopyga monilis (Guenée, 1852)
- Eriopyga monochroa Hampson, 1913
- Eriopyga monopis Dyar, 1914
- Eriopyga motilona Schaus, 1933
- Eriopyga mucorea Draudt, 1924
- Eriopyga nanduna Schaus, 1933
- Eriopyga nigridorsia E. D. Jones, 1908
- Eriopyga nigrocollaris Köhler, 1947
- Eriopyga nisio Dyar, 1916
- Eriopyga niveipuncta (Schaus, 1894)
- Eriopyga ochrota (Schaus, 1903)
- Eriopyga oroba (Druce, 1889)
- Eriopyga panostigma Dyar, 1910
- Eriopyga pansapha Dyar, 1918
- Eriopyga pariole Draudt, 1924
- Eriopyga paulista E. D. Jones, 1915
- Eriopyga perfusata Dognin, 1914
- Eriopyga perfusca Hampson, 1905
- Eriopyga perrubra Hampson, 1909
- Eriopyga phaeostigma Druce, 1908
- Eriopyga phanerozona Dyar, 1918
- Eriopyga poasina Schaus, 1911
- Eriopyga poliotis Hampson, 1905
- Eriopyga polygrapha Hampson, 1913
- Eriopyga prasinospila Hampson, 1911
- Eriopyga punctulum Guenée, 1852
- Eriopyga pyropis Hampson, 1905
- Eriopyga ratelusia Dyar, 1916
- Eriopyga rea Dyar, 1916
- Eriopyga remipes Zerny, 1916
- Eriopyga renalba Schaus, 1911
- Eriopyga rhadata (Druce, 1894)
- Eriopyga rhimla Dyar, 1910
- Eriopyga rhodohoria Dyar, 1916
- Eriopyga ropilla (Dognin, 1897)
- Eriopyga rubicundula Schaus, 1911
- Eriopyga rubifer Dyar, 1916
- Eriopyga rubor (Guenée, 1852)
- Eriopyga rubripuncta (Schaus, 1903)
- Eriopyga rubrirena Hampson, 1913
- Eriopyga scalaris Draudt, 1924
- Eriopyga simplex Dyar, 1916
- Eriopyga spodiaca Dognin, 1914
- Eriopyga stenia Dognin, 1907
- Eriopyga stictipenna Dyar, 1914
- Eriopyga strigifacta Dyar, 1910
- Eriopyga stygia Dognin, 1908
- Eriopyga sublecta Dyar, 1910
- Eriopyga subolivacea Hampson, 1905
- Eriopyga subtegula Dognin, 1914
- Eriopyga suffusa E. D. Jones, 1915
- Eriopyga sutrix Draudt, 1924
- Eriopyga taciturna Dognin, 1914
- Eriopyga tama Schaus, 1933
- Eriopyga tebota Dyar, 1916
- Eriopyga tenebrosa Draudt, 1924
- Eriopyga tersa (Druce, 1898)
- Eriopyga tertulia (Dognin, 1897)
- Eriopyga thermistis Druce, 1905
- Eriopyga thermosema Dognin, 1919
- Eriopyga torrida Dognin, 1907
- Eriopyga trinotata Draudt, 1924
- Eriopyga umbracula Dognin, 1914
- Eriopyga unicolora (Maassen, 1890)
- Eriopyga viuda (Dognin, 1897)
- Eriopyga volcania Schaus, 1911
- Eriopyga xera Dyar, 1914

== Former species ==
- Eriopyga iole is now Pseudorthodes iole (Schaus, 1894)
