= Geolycosa hectoria =

Table Mountain Geolycosa wolf spider

Scientific classification
- Kingdom: Animalia
- Phylum: Arthropoda
- Subphylum: Chelicerata
- Class: Arachnida
- Order: Araneae
- Infraorder: Araneomorphae
- Family: Lycosidae
- Genus: Geolycosa
- Species: G. hectoria

Binomial name
- Geolycosa hectoria (Pocock, 1900)

Synonyms
- Lycosa hectoria Pocock, 1900; Scaptocosa hectoria Roewer, 1955

Species of spider

Geolycosa hectoria is a species of spider in the family Lycosidae. It is endemic to South Africa and is commonly known as the Table Mountain Geolycosa wolf spider.

== Distribution ==
Geolycosa hectoria is found only in the Western Cape province of South Africa. The species has been recorded from Table Mountain National Park and Kirstenbosch National Botanical Garden.

== Habitat and ecology ==
This species is a ground dweller that lives in cylindrical burrows.

It has been sampled from the Fynbos biome at altitudes ranging from 9 to 178 m.

== Description ==
Known only from females, Geolycosa hectoria has distinctive leg banding patterns. The fourth tibia is strongly banded below with black at the base and tip, while the third leg shows less distinct banding.

The ventral abdomen has a faintly defined median band.

Females measure 16 to 19 mm in total length.

== Conservation ==
The species is known only from two localities with a limited range. The status remains unclear, and additional sampling is needed to collect males and determine the full geographic range. It is protected within Table Mountain National Park.

== Taxonomy ==
The species was originally described by Pocock in 1900 as Lycosa hectoria from Table Mountain National Park. It was later revised by Roewer in 1959.
