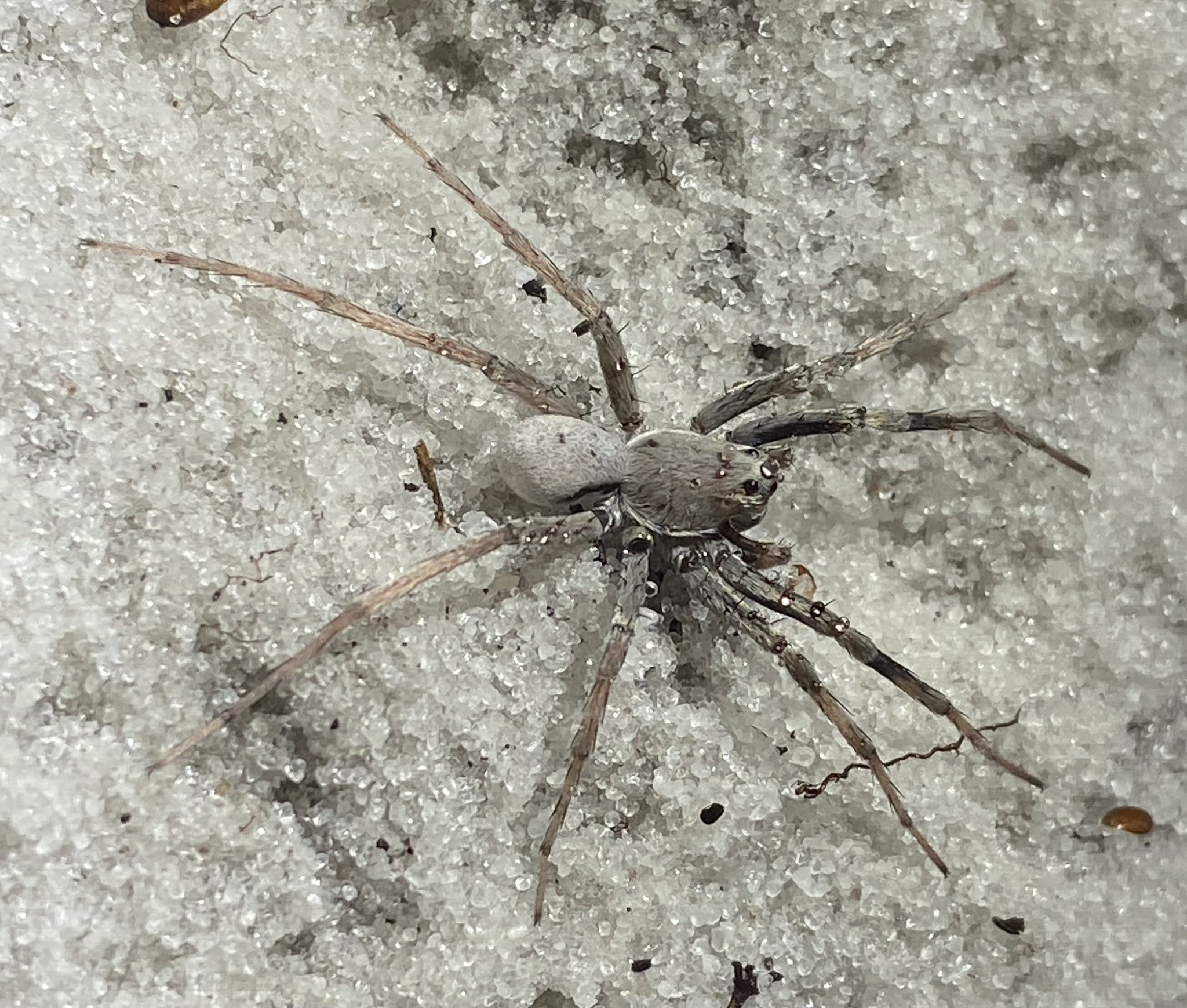

Conservation status
- Imperiled (NatureServe)

Scientific classification
- Kingdom: Animalia
- Phylum: Arthropoda
- Subphylum: Chelicerata
- Class: Arachnida
- Order: Araneae
- Infraorder: Araneomorphae
- Family: Lycosidae
- Genus: Geolycosa
- Species: G. xera

Binomial name
- Geolycosa xera McCrone, 1963

= Geolycosa xera =

Species of spider

Geolycosa xera, or McCrone's burrowing wolf spider, is a species of wolf spider (Lycosidae). It is endemic to Florida in the United States. Their limited distribution appears to be similar to that of several other notable Florida scrub arthropods.

== Subspecies ==
There are two subspecies of Geolycosa xera:

- Geolycosa xera archboldi McCrone, 1963 – Endemic to scrub in Highlands County in Florida.

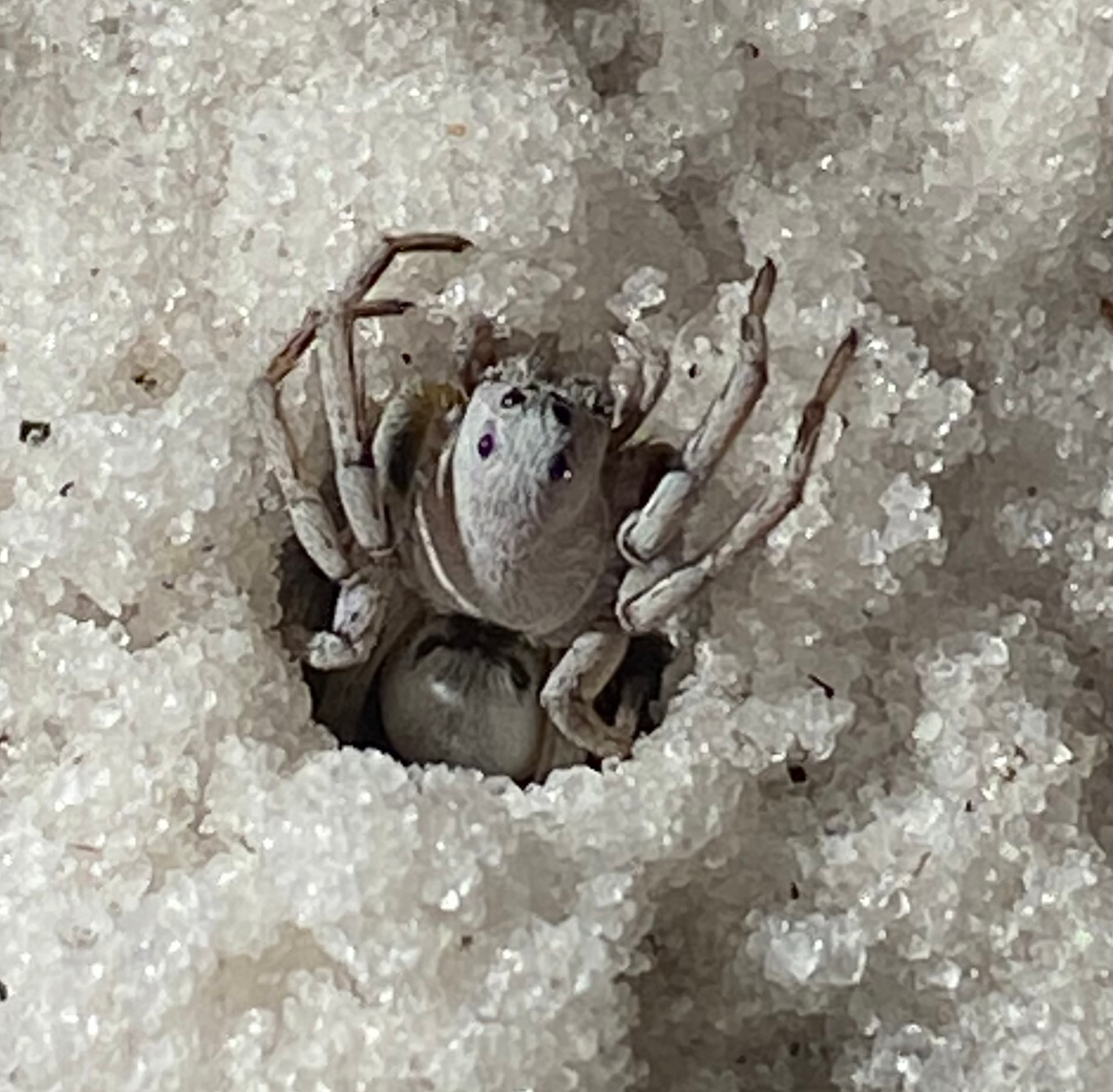
Geolycosa xera archboldi lying in ambush in its burrow at Archbold Biological Station.

- Geolycosa xera xera McCrone, 1963 – Endemic to scrub in Highlands, Lake, Orange, Polk, Seminole, and Volusia counties in Florida.
