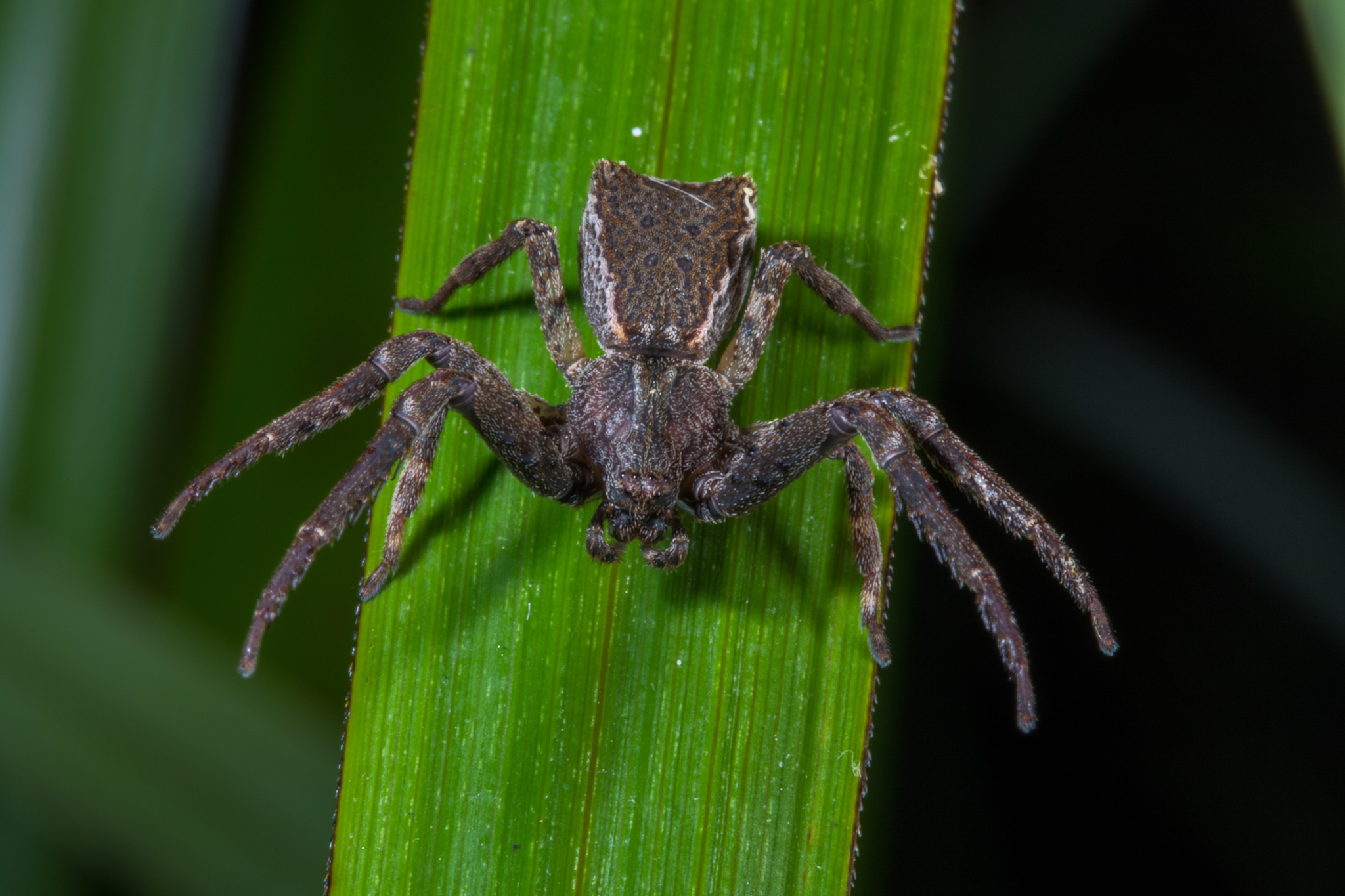
- Sidymella angularis, Great Barrier Island

Conservation status
- Not Threatened (NZ TCS)

Scientific classification
- Domain: Eukaryota
- Kingdom: Animalia
- Phylum: Arthropoda
- Subphylum: Chelicerata
- Class: Arachnida
- Order: Araneae
- Infraorder: Araneomorphae
- Family: Thomisidae
- Genus: Sidymella
- Species: S. angularis

Binomial name
- Sidymella angularis (Urquhart, 1885)

Synonyms
- Sparassus angularis Urquhart, 1885; Sidyma angularis Bryant, 1933 (preoccupied genus name)

= Sidymella angularis =

Species of spider

Sidymella angularis (also known as the common square-ended crab spider), is a species of crab spider endemic to New Zealand.

Like all thomisid spiders, this species does not make a web, but lies in wait for prey to appear nearby. It eats insects, or occasionally other small spiders. It lives in leaf litter on the forest floor or in low vegetation. A closely-related and similar species S. angulata has the same range and habitat.

== Taxonomy ==
The species was first described by in 1885 by Urquhart in the genus Sparassus. It was placed in the genus Sidyma by Bryant in 1933; however, it was discovered that a genus of moths had already been called Sidyma, so in 1942 Strand provided the replacement name Sidymella. It is a member of the subfamily Stephanopinae in the family Thomisidae.

== Appearance ==
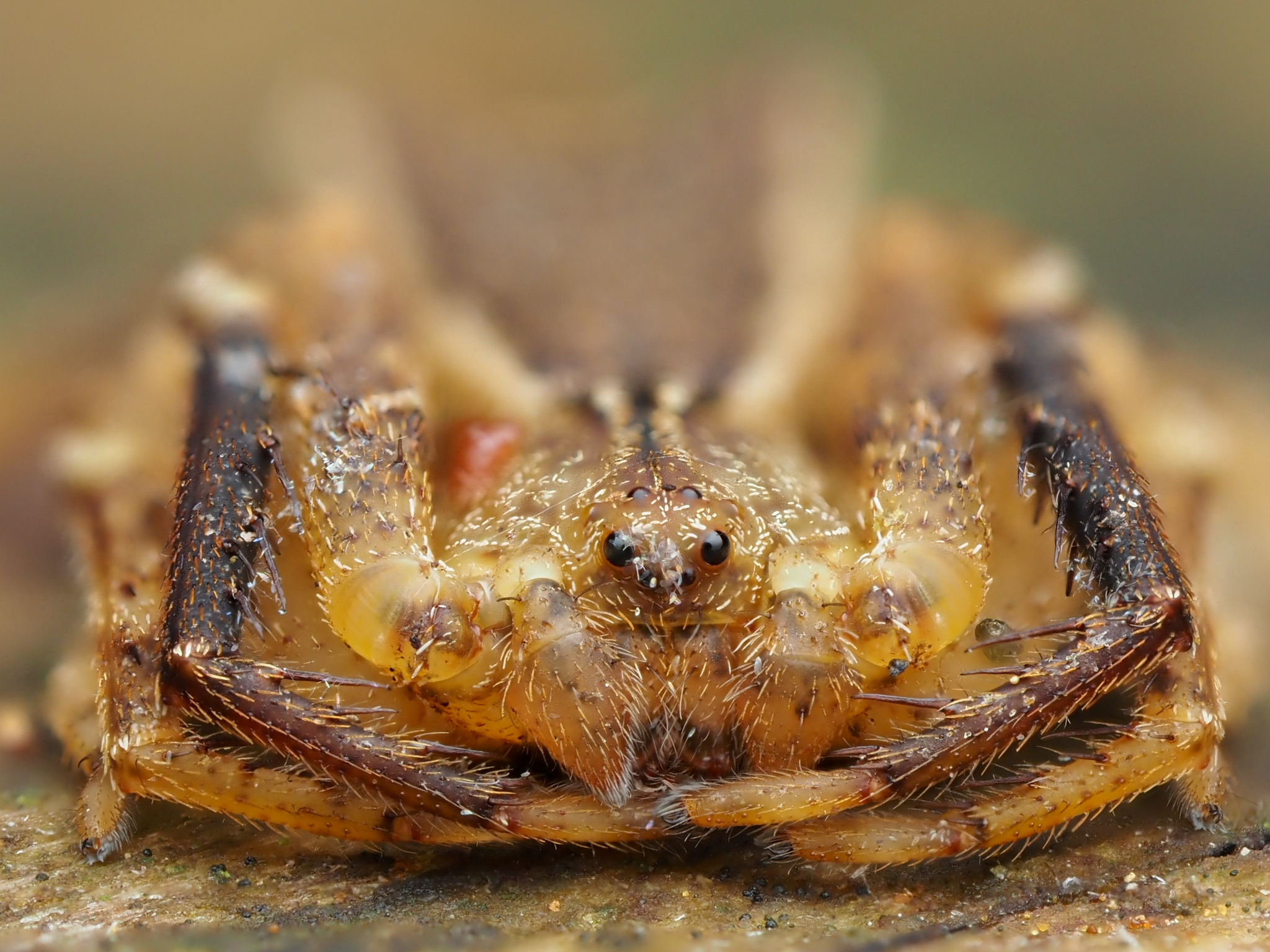
Sidymella angularis showing longitudinal ridges above the eyes

Sidymella angularis is one of the square-ended crab spiders. These spiders have a trapezoidal abdomen, giving them a truncated appearance. This species can occur in a variety of colours including shades of grey, yellow and brown, and has a gnarled body texture. It can be distinguished from the related Sidymella angulata by the presence of two longitudinal ridges on the cephalothorax. These are absent in S. angulata, which also has a large socketed forward-pointing spine on the femur of the first leg.

== Behaviour ==
Square-ended crab spiders, including S. angularis, can use thanatosis (playing dead) to avoid predators. Their colouring and texture help create the appearance of a fragment of bark or debris, but after dropping to the ground on a dragline, they often end up upside down. In New Zealand Spiders and their Worldwide Kin, husband and wife spider experts Ray and Lyn Forster describe how a square-ended crab spider can turn itself the right way up by pushing with its legs and using the square-end of the abdomen as a pivot point.

Like other New Zealand thomisids, S. angularis is an ambush predator rather than a snare builder. It lies in wait, using its powerful front legs to grab prey before delivering a bite. These legs are armed with spines that prevent prey escaping.

Their flat-looking egg sacs are often laid on the underside of dead leaves, with females frequently standing guard.

== Distribution ==
Sidymella angularis is only found in New Zealand. It is the commonest of New Zealand's square-ended crab spiders, and is found from Northland to Stewart Island. It occurs in habitat ranging from suburban gardens to native bush, and is often found on ferns, particularly on tree trunks, dead ferns, and in leaf litter.

== Phylogenetics ==
A preliminary phylogenetic analysis suggests New Zealand stephanopines including S. angularis diverged from their Australian relatives approximately five million years ago.

== Conservation status and threats ==
Sidymella angularis is listed as Not Threatened as of 2020, under the New Zealand Threat Classification System.

== Gallery ==
Variation in colour of S. angularis

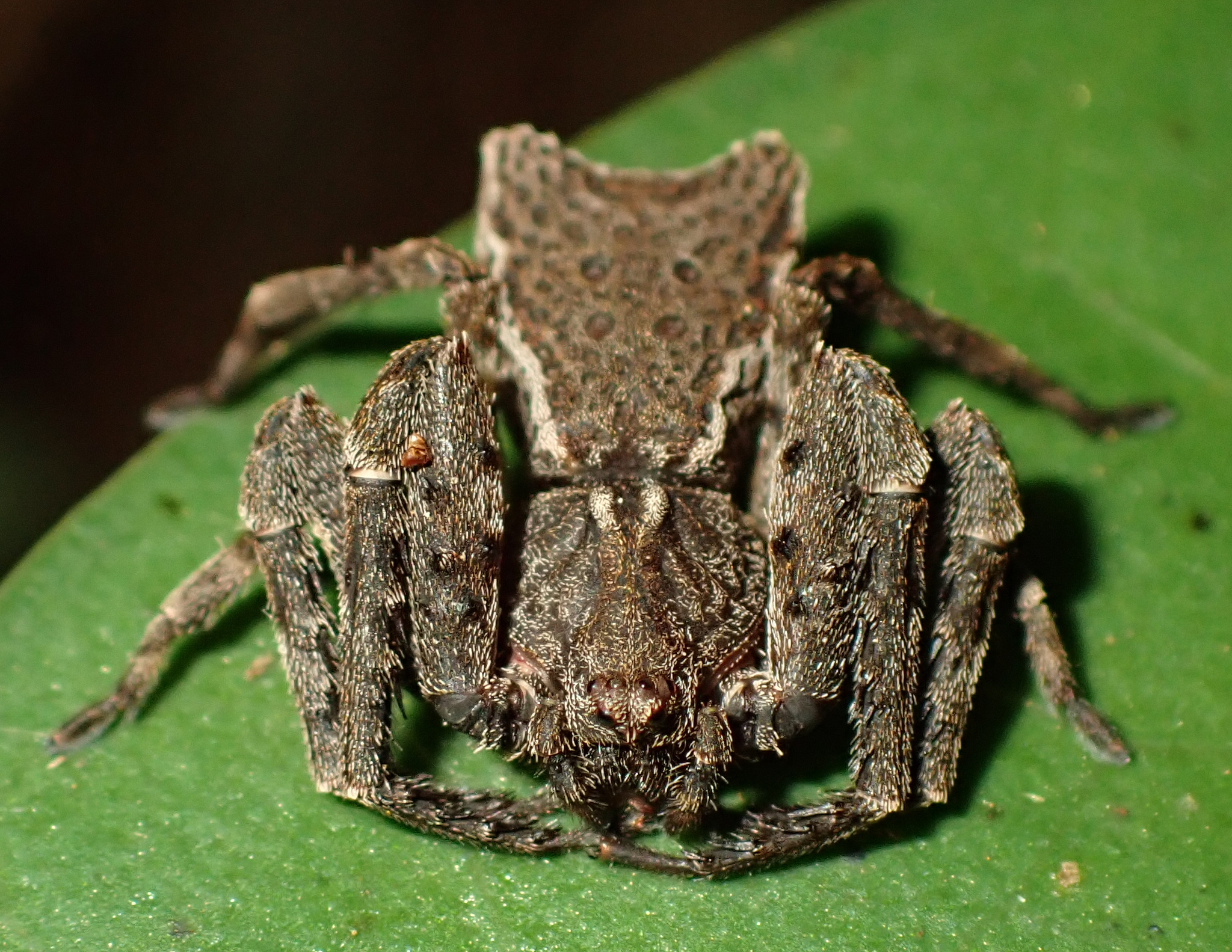

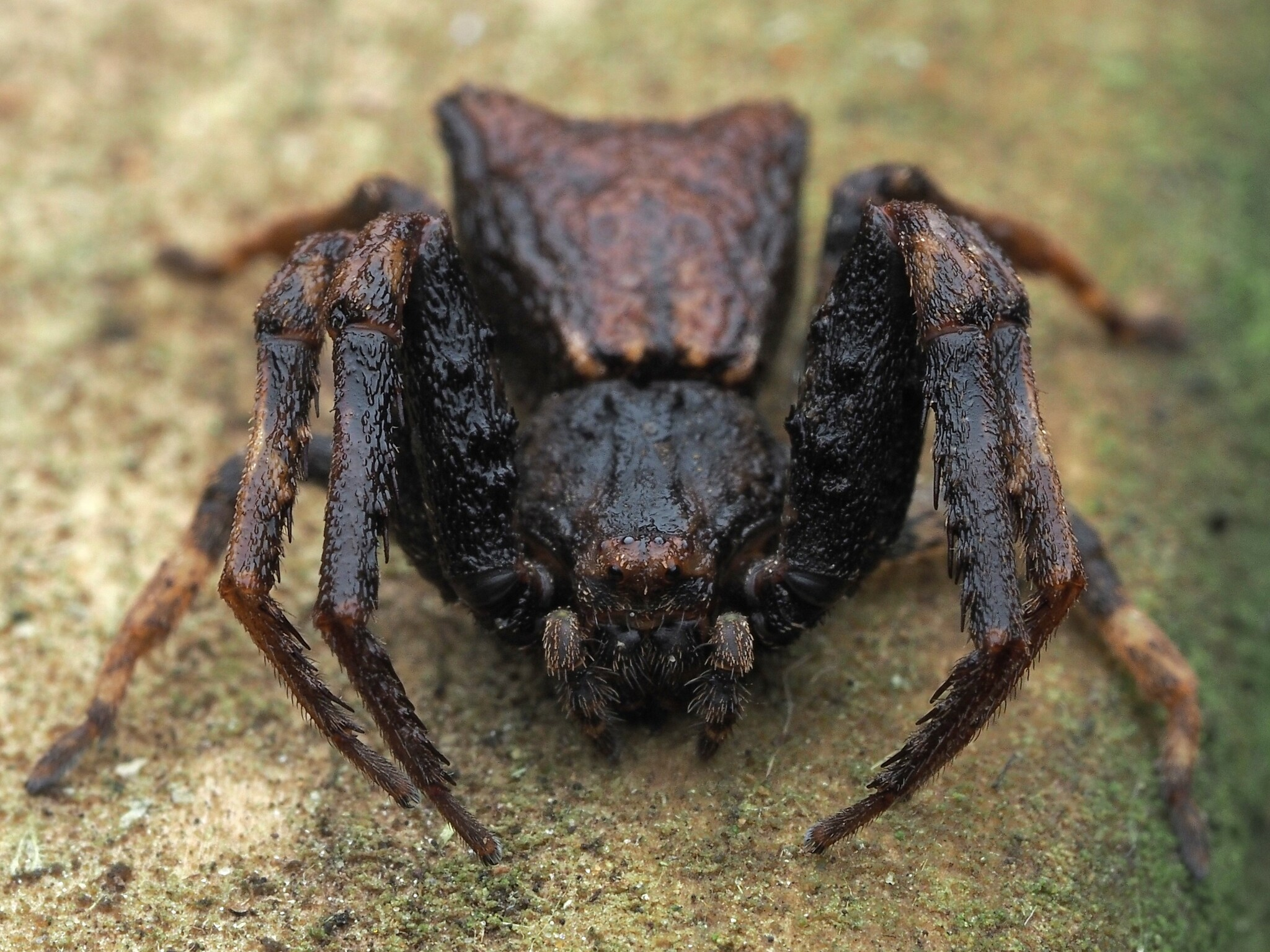

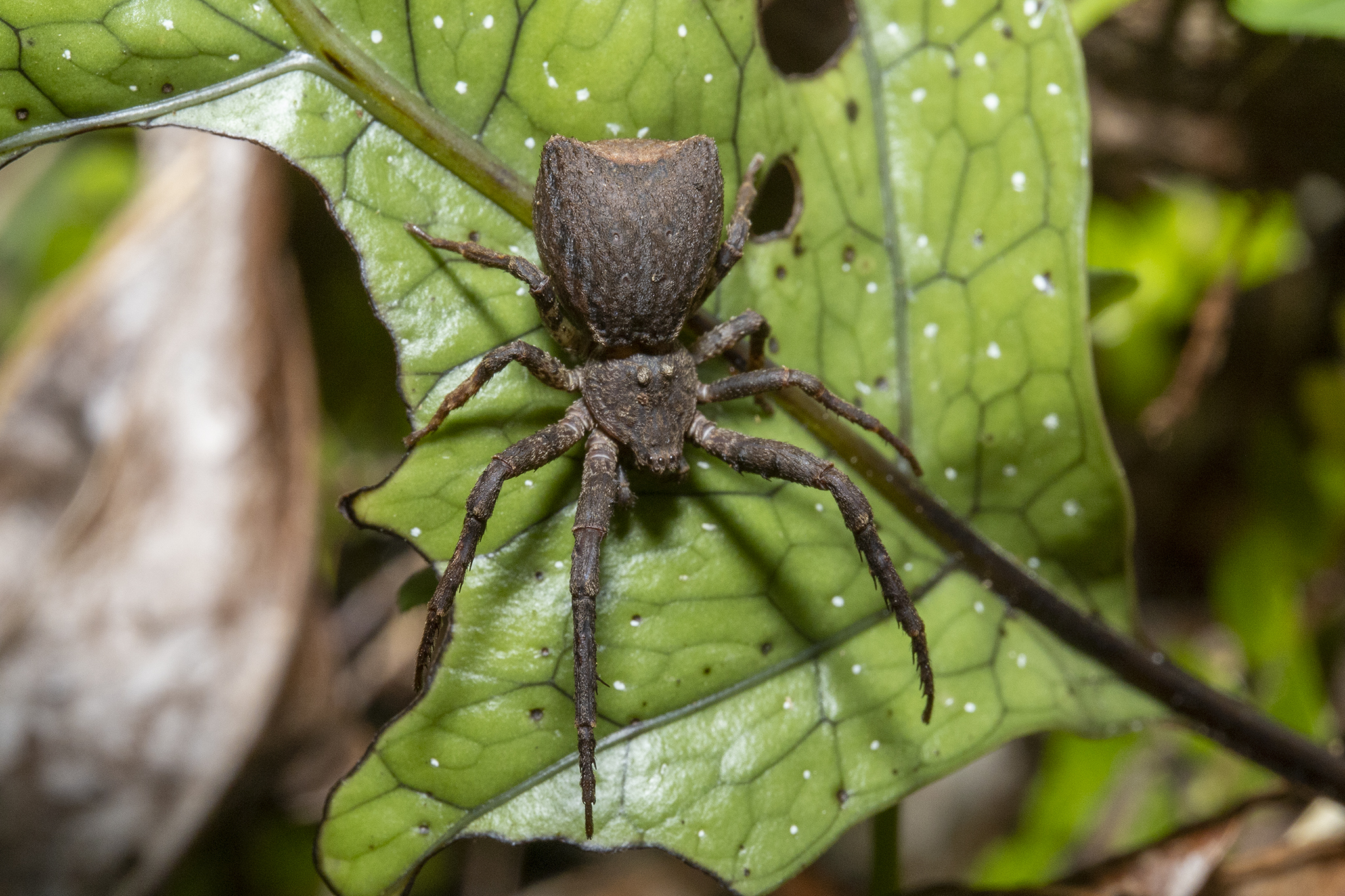
