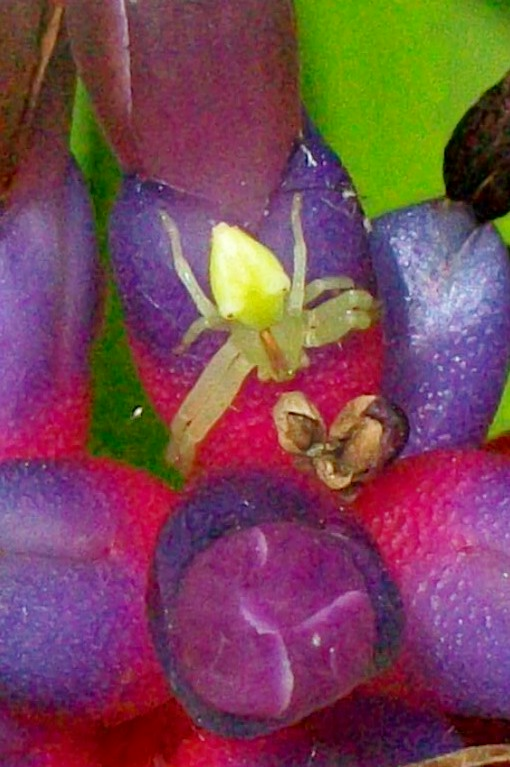
- Sidymella rubrosignata juvenile on a bromeliad at Chatswood West, Australia

Scientific classification
- Kingdom: Animalia
- Phylum: Arthropoda
- Subphylum: Chelicerata
- Class: Arachnida
- Order: Araneae
- Infraorder: Araneomorphae
- Family: Thomisidae
- Genus: Sidymella
- Species: S. rubrosignata

Binomial name
- Sidymella rubrosignata (L. Koch, 1874)

Synonyms
- Stephanopis rubrosignata L. Koch, 1874; Sidyma rubrosignata Dalmas, 1917 (preoccupied genus name)

= Sidymella rubrosignata =

Species of spider

Sidymella rubrosignata is a species of crab spiders found in Australia. It is a common spider, often seen on Dianella plants.

Like all thomisid spiders, it does not make a web, but lies in wait for prey to appear nearby. Their prey is insects, or occasionally other small spiders.

== Description ==
Often these spiders are a well camouflaged green, making their presence difficult to discern on green leaves or flowers. Occasionally they may be yellow, light brown or reddish. Males are 4.5 mm long, females 8 mm. Males are slimmer and smaller.

The front two pairs of legs are much longer than the other two pairs of legs. The abdomen is trapezium shaped, with a pair of dorsal humps, with a red patch on each of them. The cephalothorax is pear-shaped.

=== Egg sac ===
The egg sac is in a leaf, with the tip folded back to cover the eggs. The leaf edges are curled around by silk to provide protection. The eggs are 0.8 mm in diameter, nonsticky, and cream in colour. There are usually 20 to 35 eggs in each egg sac.

== Taxonomy ==
The species was first described by in 1874 by Ludwig Koch in the genus Stephanopis. It was later placed in the genus Sidyma by R. de Delmas in 1917; however, it was discovered that a genus of moths had already been called Sidyma, so in 1942, Strand provided the replacement name Sidymella.
