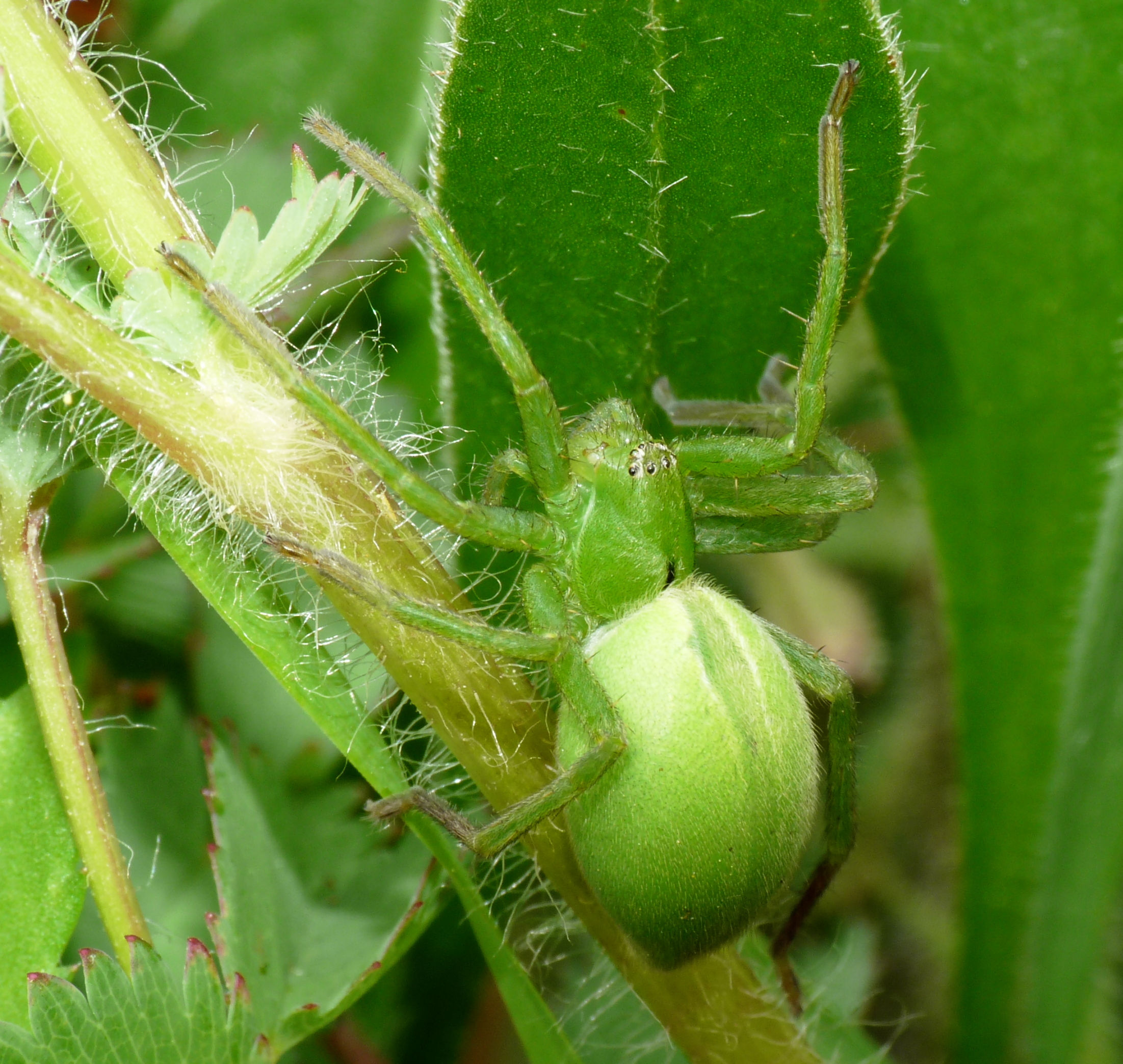
- Female M. ligurina near Livorno, Tuscany, Italy

Scientific classification
- Kingdom: Animalia
- Phylum: Arthropoda
- Subphylum: Chelicerata
- Class: Arachnida
- Order: Araneae
- Infraorder: Araneomorphae
- Family: Sparassidae
- Genus: Micrommata
- Species: M. ligurina

Binomial name
- Micrommata ligurina C. L. Koch, 1845

Synonyms
- Micrommata ligurinum; Sparassus ligurinus; Sparassus pilosus

= Micrommata ligurina =

Species of spider

Micrommata ligurina is a species of huntsman spider. It was first described by Carl Ludwig Koch in 1845.

== Description ==
In the females of Micrommata ligurina the body length can reach 9–14 millimetres (0.35–0.55 in), while in the males it is about 6–9 millimetres (0.24–0.35 in). The carapace is long and narrow and the abdomen is elongate. The cephalothorax and the long legs of the females are bright green, with a lighter green abdomen showing an almost indistinct median band.

This spider is very similar to the green huntsman spider (Micrommata virescens), but the females have a black dot on the carapace. Moreover the adult males of M. ligurina have a dark brown median band on abdomen with whitish or gray sides.

The eight eyes are arranged in two rows and surrounded by white hairs. Adults can be found in late winter and in early spring.

== Distribution ==
Micrommata ligurina occurs from the Mediterranean Basin to Central Asia. The range of this species includes Bulgaria, Croatia, France, Great Britain, Greece, Italy, Macedonia, Malta, Portugal, Romania and Spain.

== Habitat ==
These huntsman spiders live on herbaceous vegetation.

== Gallery ==
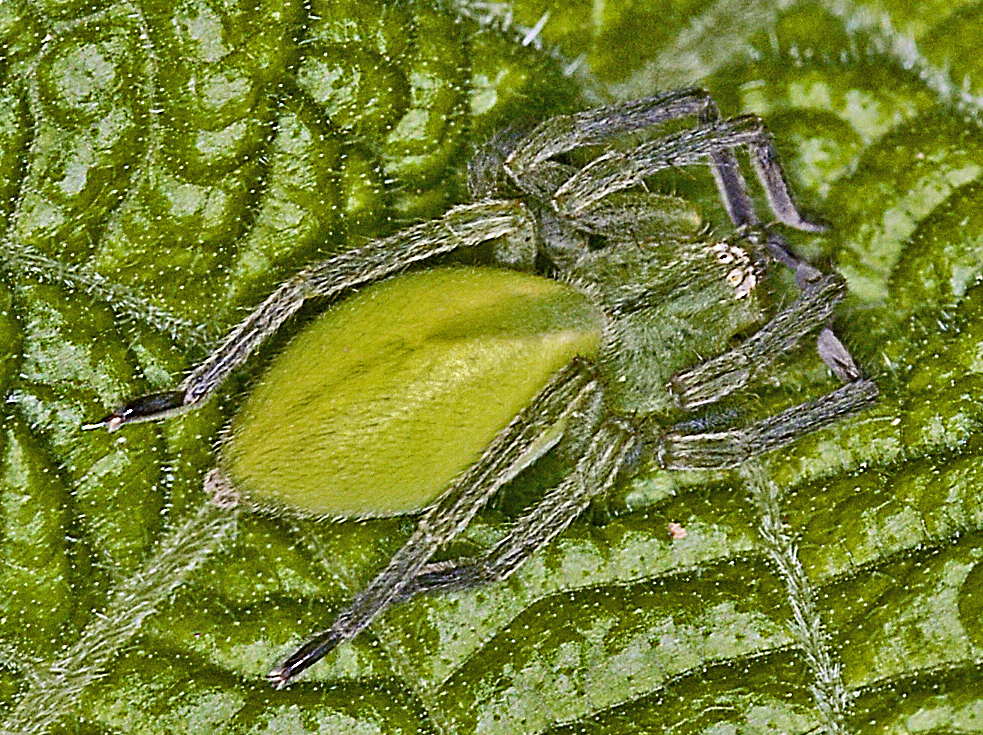
Female of Micrommata ligurina

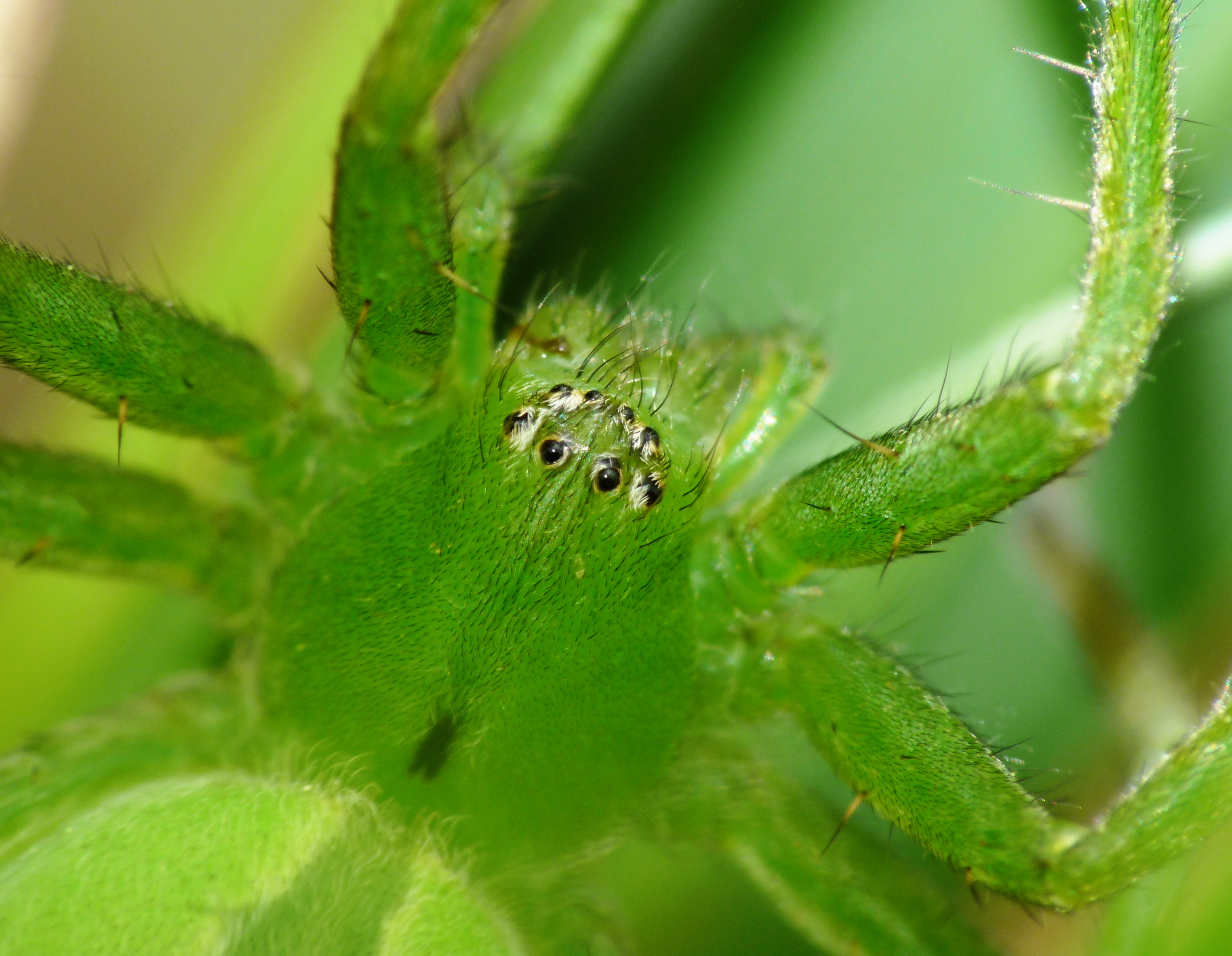
Eyes and cephalothorax of M. ligurina

== Bibliography ==
- Koch, C. L. (1845). Die Arachniden. Nürnberg, Zwolfter Band, pp. 1–166.
- Kulczyński, W. (1911a). Fragmenta Arachnologica. XVI, XVII. Bulletin International de l'Académie des Sciences de Cracovie 1911: 12-75.
- Lecigne, S. (2013). Contribution à l'inventaire aranéologique de Corfou (Grèce) (Arachnida, Araneae). Nieuwsbrief van de Belgische Arachnologische Vereniging 28: 177-191.
- Levy, G. (1989). The family of huntsman spiders in Israel with annotations on species of the Middle East (Araneae: Sparassidae). Journal of Zoology, London 217: 127-176.
- Simon, E. (1870b). Aranéides nouveaux ou peu connus du midi de l'Europe. Mémoires de la Société Royale des Sciences de Liège (2) 3: 271-358.
- Simon, E. (1874b). Etudes aracnologiques. 3e mémoire. V. Révision des espèces européennes de la famille des Sparassidae. Annales de la Société Entomologique de France (5) 4: 243-279.
- Simon, E. (1875a). Les arachnides de France. Paris 2, 1-350.
- Simon, E. (1932). Les arachnides de France. Tome VI. Synopsis générale et catalogue des espèces françaises de l'ordre des Araneae; 4e partie. Paris 6, 773-978.
- Urones, C. (2004). El género Micrommata (Araneae, Sparassidae) en la Península Ibérica, con la descripción do dos nuevas especies. Revista Ibérica de Aracnología 10: 41-52.
