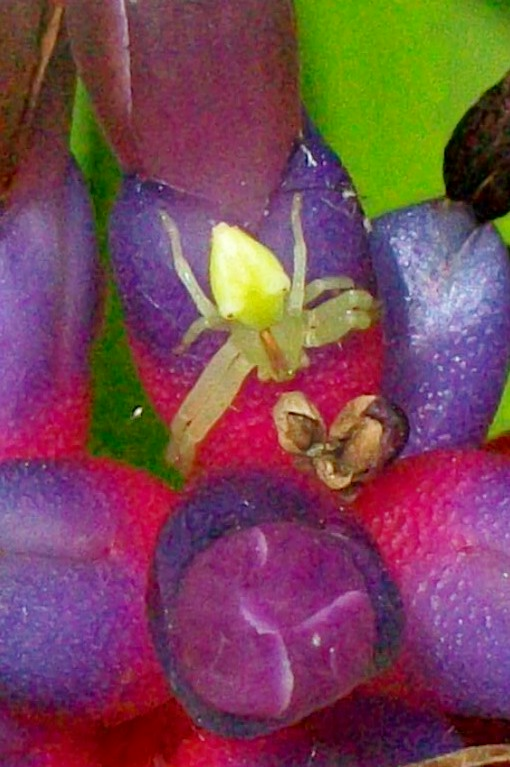
- Sidymella rubrosignata juvenile on a bromeliad at Chatswood West, Australia

Scientific classification
- Kingdom: Animalia
- Phylum: Arthropoda
- Subphylum: Chelicerata
- Class: Arachnida
- Order: Araneae
- Infraorder: Araneomorphae
- Family: Thomisidae
- Genus: Sidymella; Strand, 1942

Species
- 19, see text

Synonyms
- Sidyma Simon, 1895 (preoccupied by Sidyma Walker, 1856)

= Sidymella =

Genus of spiders

Sidymella is a genus of spider in the family Thomisidae, found in South America, Australia and New Zealand. It was originally named Sidyma, but this was later found to have been used already for a genus of moths.

== Taxonomy ==
The genus was first erected by Eugène Simon in 1895 under the name Sidyma, with the type species Sidyma lucida. However, it was later discovered that there was a moth genus Sidyma, named in 1856, so the genus name was preoccupied. The replacement name Sidymella was provided by Strand in 1942.

== Species ==
As of June 2026, the World Spider Catalog accepted 21 species:

- Sidymella angularis (Urquhart, 1885) – New Zealand
- Sidymella angulata (Urquhart, 1885) – New Zealand
- Sidymella ayahuma Díaz-Guevara & Machado, 2026 – Ecuador
- Sidymella benhami (Hogg, 1910) – New Zealand (Stewart Is.)
- Sidymella bicuspidata (L. Koch, 1874) – Australia (Queensland)
- Sidymella excavata (Machado & Guzati, 2019) – Colombia, Ecuador, Peru, Argentina
- Sidymella furcillata (Keyserling, 1880) – Brazil, Argentina
- Sidymella hirsuta (L. Koch, 1874) – Australia (Queensland)
- Sidymella jordanensis (Soares, 1944) – Brazil
- Sidymella kochi (Simon, 1908) – Australia (Western Australia)
- Sidymella kolpogaster (Lise, 1973) – Brazil
- Sidymella lampei (Strand, 1913) – Australia (Victoria)
- Sidymella longipes (L. Koch, 1874) – Australia (Queensland)
- Sidymella longispina (Mello-Leitão, 1943) – Brazil
- Sidymella lucida (Keyserling, 1880) (type species) – Colombia, Ecuador, Brazil, Uruguay, Argentina
- Sidymella malefica Díaz-Guevara & Machado, 2026 – Ecuador
- Sidymella multispinulosa (Mello-Leitão, 1944) – Brazil
- Sidymella nigripes (Mello-Leitão, 1947) – Brazil
- Sidymella rubrosignata (L. Koch, 1874) – Australia (New South Wales)
- Sidymella sigillata (Mello-Leitão, 1941) – Uruguay
- Sidymella trapezia (L. Koch, 1874) – Australia (Queensland, New South Wales)
