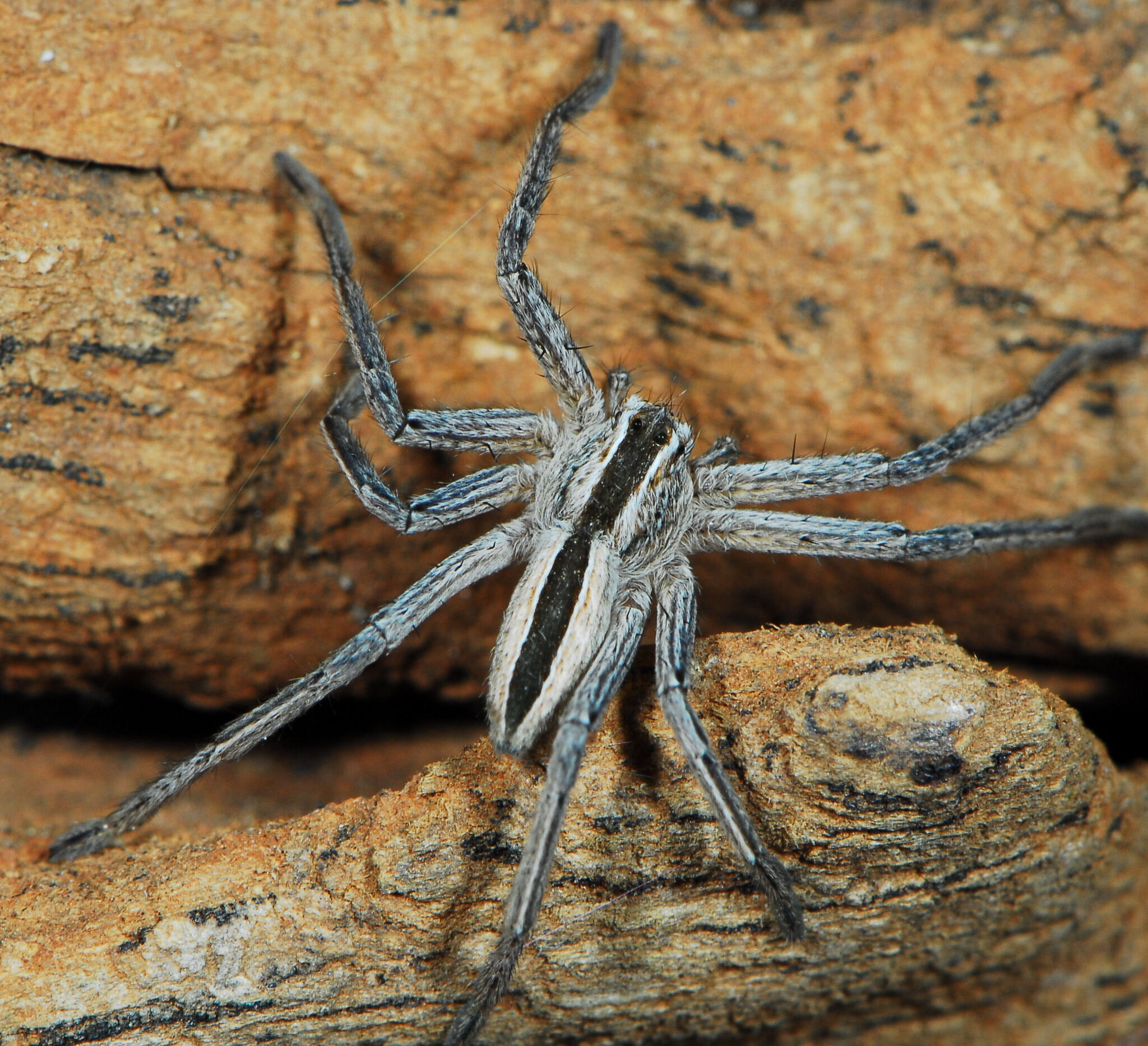
- Female
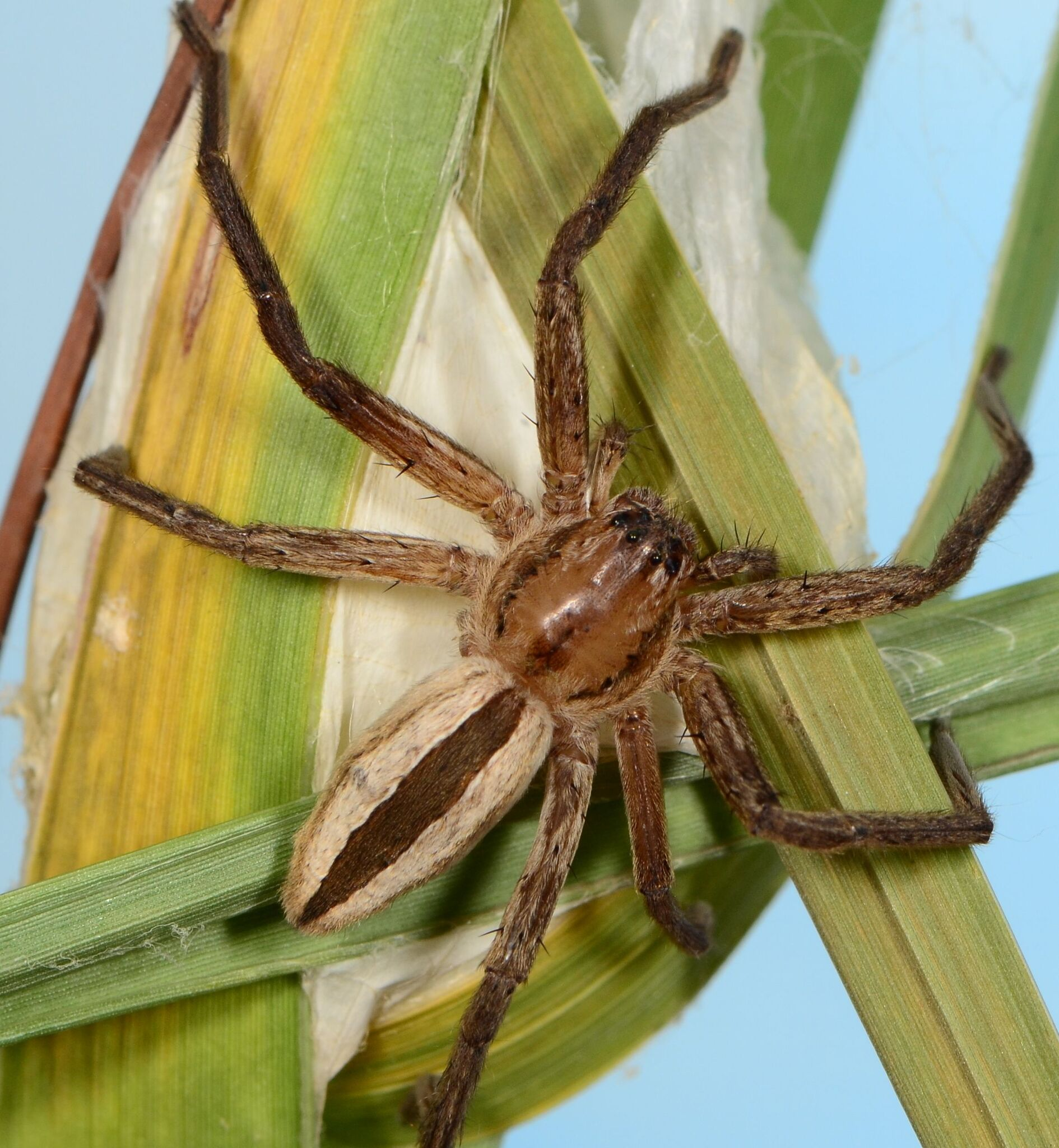
- Female

Scientific classification
- Kingdom: Animalia
- Phylum: Arthropoda
- Subphylum: Chelicerata
- Class: Arachnida
- Order: Araneae
- Infraorder: Araneomorphae
- Family: Sparassidae
- Genus: Pseudomicrommata
- Species: P. longipes

Binomial name
- Pseudomicrommata longipes (Bösenberg & Lenz, 1895)

Synonyms
- Micrommata longipes Bösenberg & Lenz, 1895; Pseudomicrommata vittigera Järvi, 1912; Micromatta longipes Lessert, 1936

= Pseudomicrommata longipes =

Grass huntsman spider

Species of spider

Pseudomicrommata longipes is an African spider species in the family Sparassidae. It is commonly known as the grass huntsman spider.

== Distribution ==
Pseudomicrommata longipes is recorded from Kenya, Tanzania, Namibia, Botswana, Mozambique, and South Africa.

In South Africa, the species is recorded from eight provinces and is well protected in numerous reserves including Kruger National Park, Ndumo Game Reserve, Polokwane Nature Reserve, De Hoop Nature Reserve, and Blouberg Nature Reserve. It occurs at altitudes ranging from 15 to 1,523 m.

== Habitat and ecology ==
Pseudomicrommata longipes is a grass dweller. Females construct a papery egg sac attached to grass leaves.

The spiders are sampled from grass but also occur in bushes, small trees, and leaf litter. The species has been recorded from the Fynbos, Grassland, Savanna, and Thicket biomes.

== Description ==
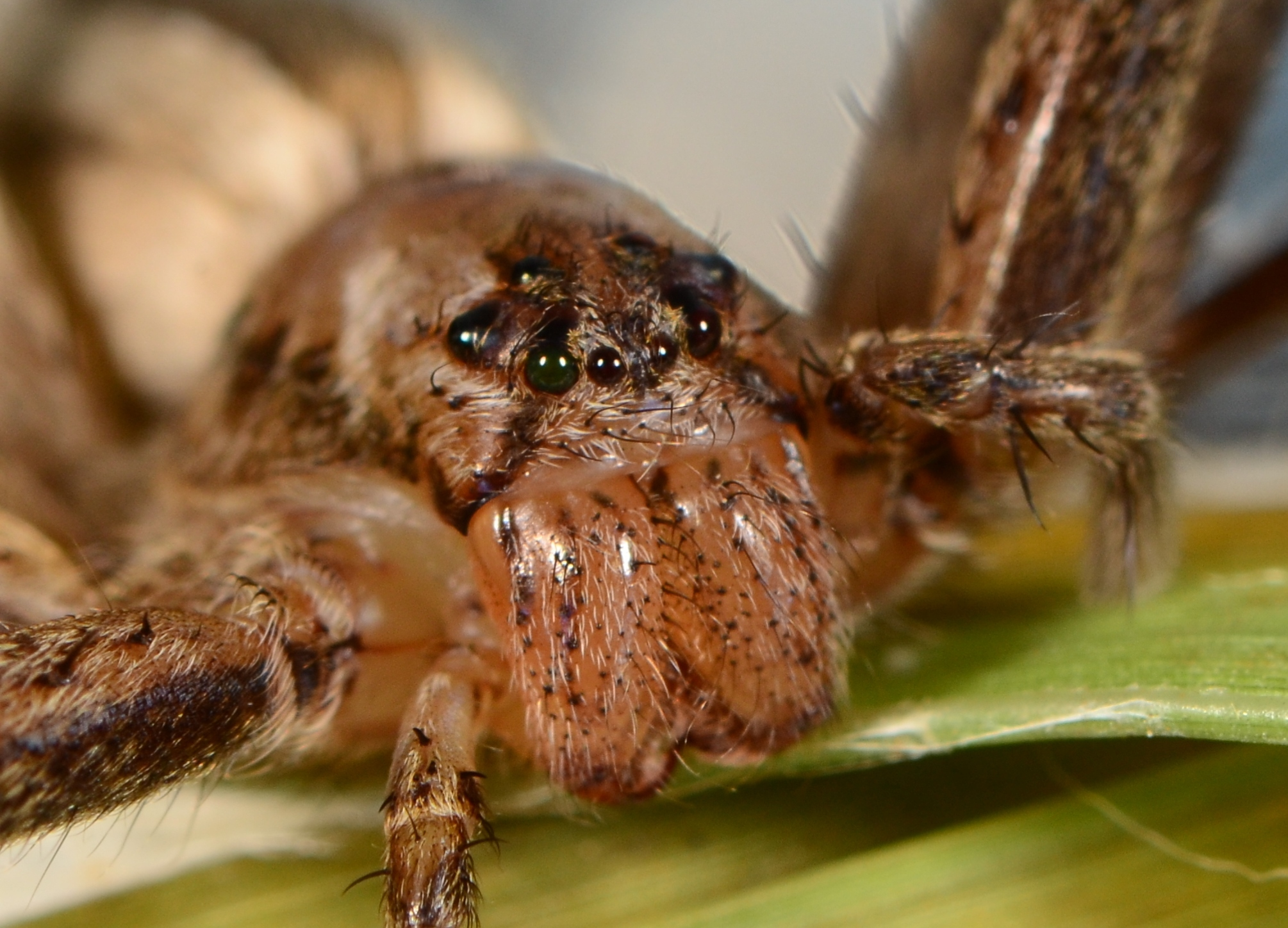
Female

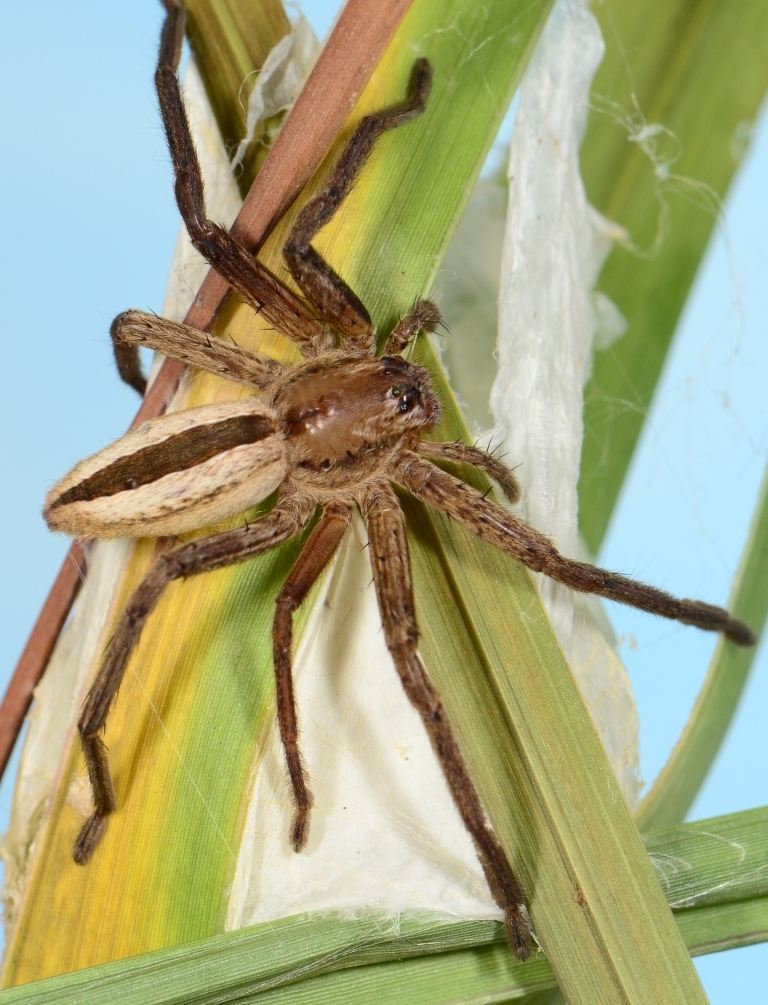
Female

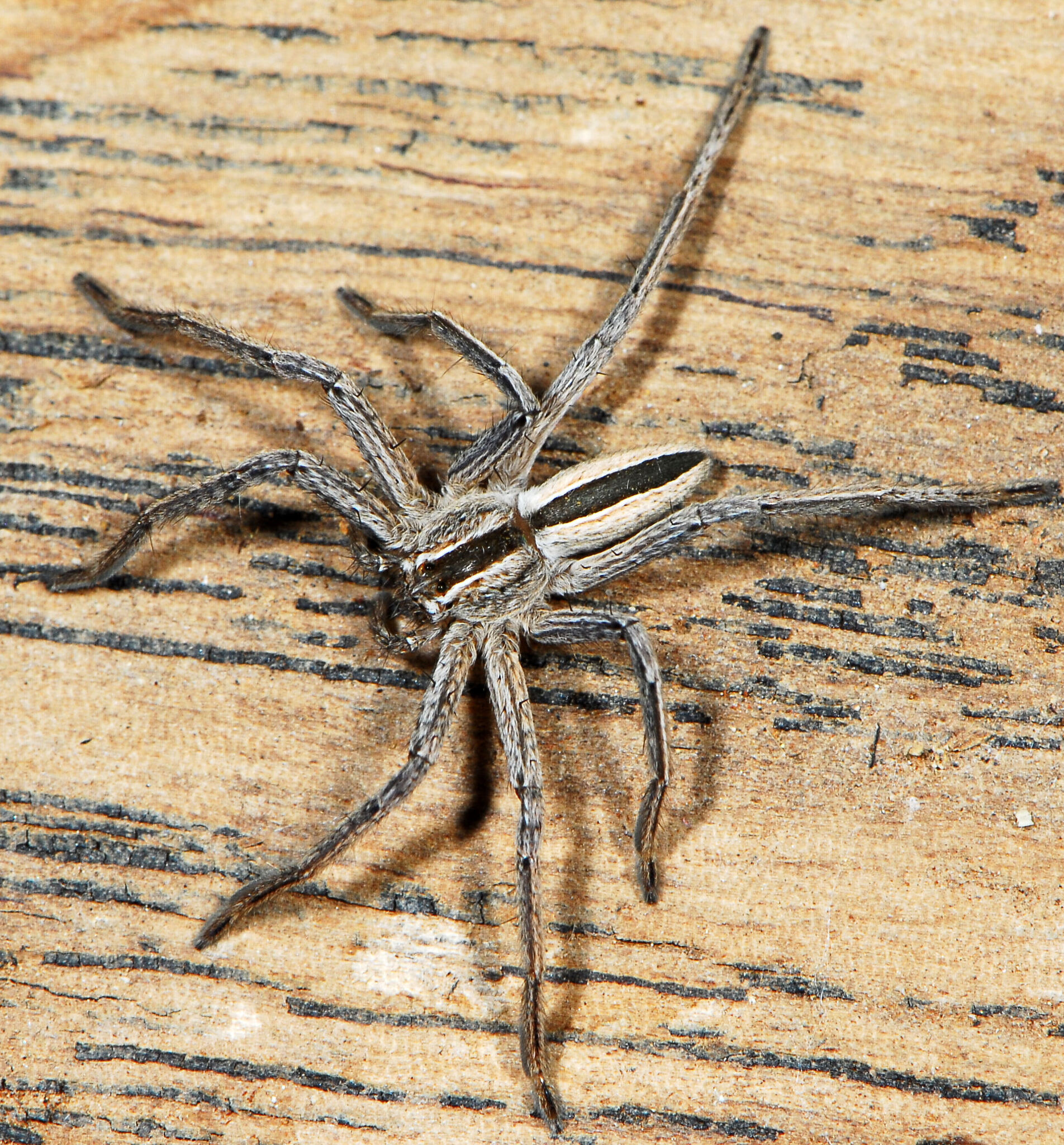
Female

== Conservation ==
Pseudomicrommata longipes is listed as Least Concern by the South African National Biodiversity Institute due to its wide geographical range. The species is protected in Kruger National Park, Ndumo Game Reserve, Polokwane Nature Reserve, De Hoop Nature Reserve, and Blouberg Nature Reserve.

== Taxonomy ==
Pseudomicrommata longipes was originally described in 1895 as Micrommata longipes from East Africa. The species was revised by Moradmand in 2015.
