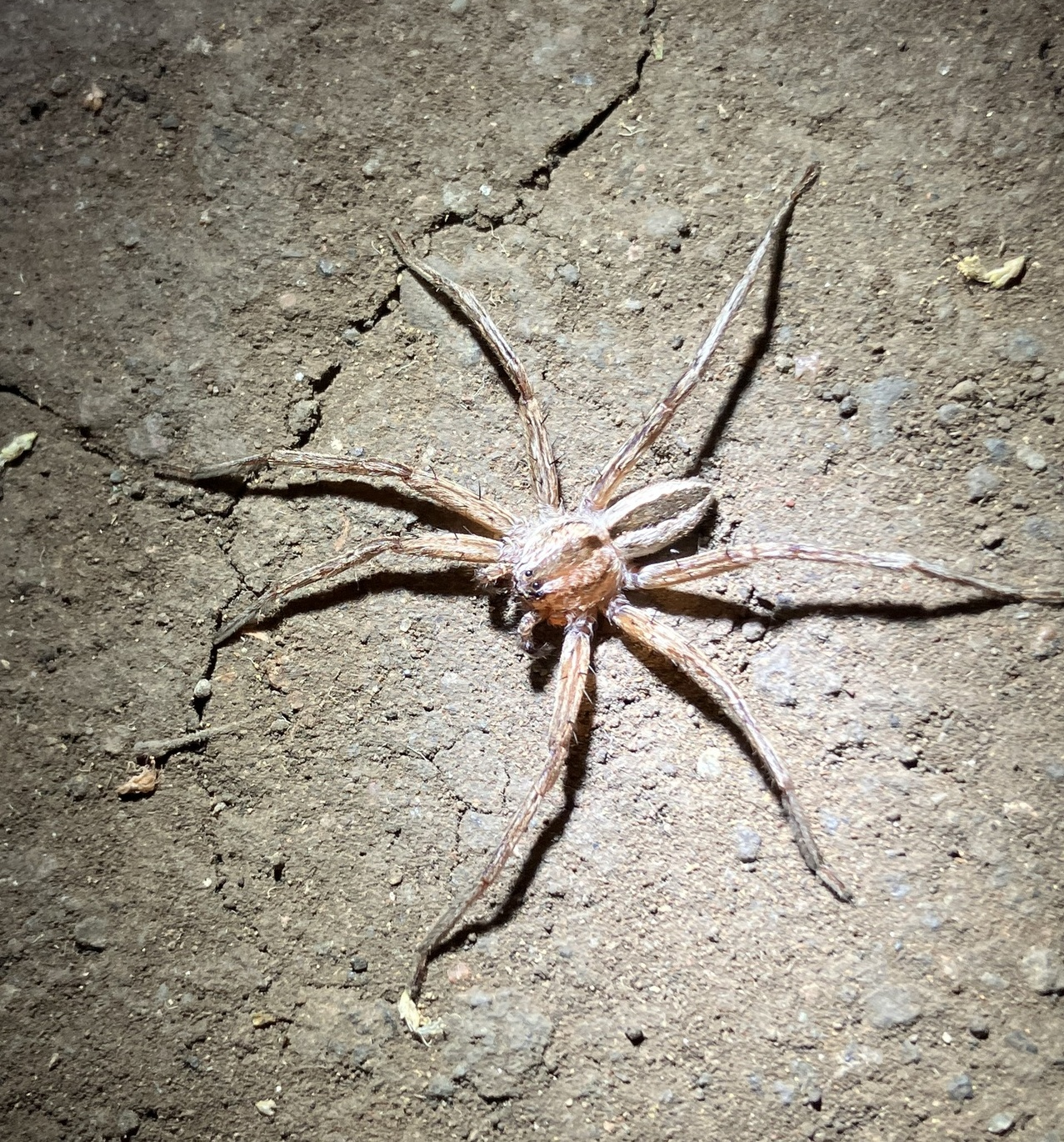

Scientific classification
- Kingdom: Animalia
- Phylum: Arthropoda
- Subphylum: Chelicerata
- Class: Arachnida
- Order: Araneae
- Infraorder: Araneomorphae
- Family: Sparassidae
- Genus: Pseudomicrommata
- Species: P. vittigera

Binomial name
- Pseudomicrommata vittigera (Simon, 1897)

Synonyms
- Micrommata vittigera Simon, 1897; Micrommata ovambica Lawrence, 1927; Pseudomicrommata longipes Jäger & Kunz, 2005

= Pseudomicrommata vittigera =

Grass huntsman spider

Species of spider

Pseudomicrommata vittigera is a spider species in the family Sparassidae. It is found in southern Africa and is commonly known as the grass huntsman spider.

== Distribution ==
Pseudomicrommata vittigera is recorded from Namibia and South Africa.

In South Africa, the species is known from three provinces: North West, Limpopo, and Mpumalanga. Notable locations include Mooi Nooi, Pafuri near Kruger National Park, Soutpansberg, and Loskop Dam Nature Reserve. It occurs at altitudes ranging from 219 to 1,346 m.

== Habitat and ecology ==
Pseudomicrommata vittigera is a free-living grass dweller. The spiders are sampled from grass but also occur in bushes, small trees, and leaf litter in the Savanna Biome.

== Conservation ==
Pseudomicrommata vittigera is listed as Least Concern by the South African National Biodiversity Institute due to its wide geographical range.

== Taxonomy ==
Pseudomicrommata vittigera was originally described by Eugène Simon in 1897 as Micrommata vittigera with the type locality given as "Transvaal". The species was revised by Moradmand in 2015, who described the male and removed the female from synonymy with P. longipes.
