= Micromatabilin =

Micromatabilin, the green pigment of the spider species Micrommata virescens, is characterized as a mixture of biliverdin conjugates. The two isolated fractions have identical absorption bands (free base: 620–630 μm, hydrochloride: 690 μm, zinc complex: 685–690 μm). Chromic acid degradation yields imides I, II, IIIa, and IIIb. Differences in the non-hydrolytic degradation and in polarity lead to the conclusion that fraction 1 is a monoconjugate and fraction 2a diconjugate of biliverdin.
