= Sidyma albifinis =

Scientific classification
- Kingdom: Animalia
- Phylum: Arthropoda
- Class: Insecta
- Order: Lepidoptera
- Superfamily: Noctuoidea
- Family: Erebidae
- Subfamily: Arctiinae
- Genus: Sidyma
- Species: S. albifinis

Binomial name
- Sidyma albifinis Walker, 1856

Species of moth

Sidyma albifinis is a moth in the subfamily Arctiinae. It was described by Francis Walker in 1856. It is found in the Himalayas.
