= Micrommata aljibica =

Scientific classification
- Kingdom: Animalia
- Phylum: Arthropoda
- Subphylum: Chelicerata
- Class: Arachnida
- Order: Araneae
- Infraorder: Araneomorphae
- Family: Sparassidae
- Genus: Micrommata
- Species: M. aljibica

Binomial name
- Micrommata aljibica Urones, 2004

Species of spider

Micrommata aljibica is a spider species found in Spain.
