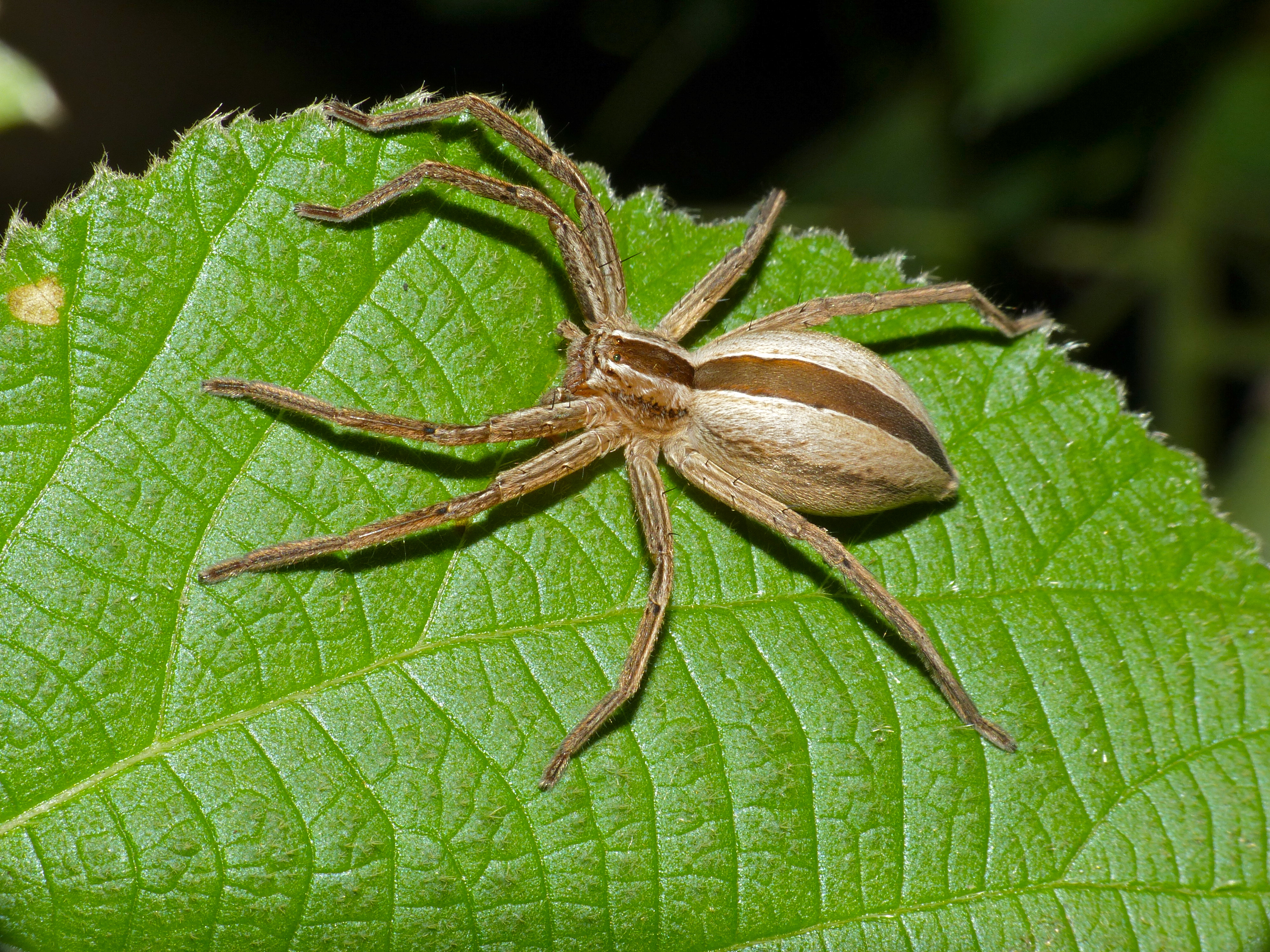
- P. longipes
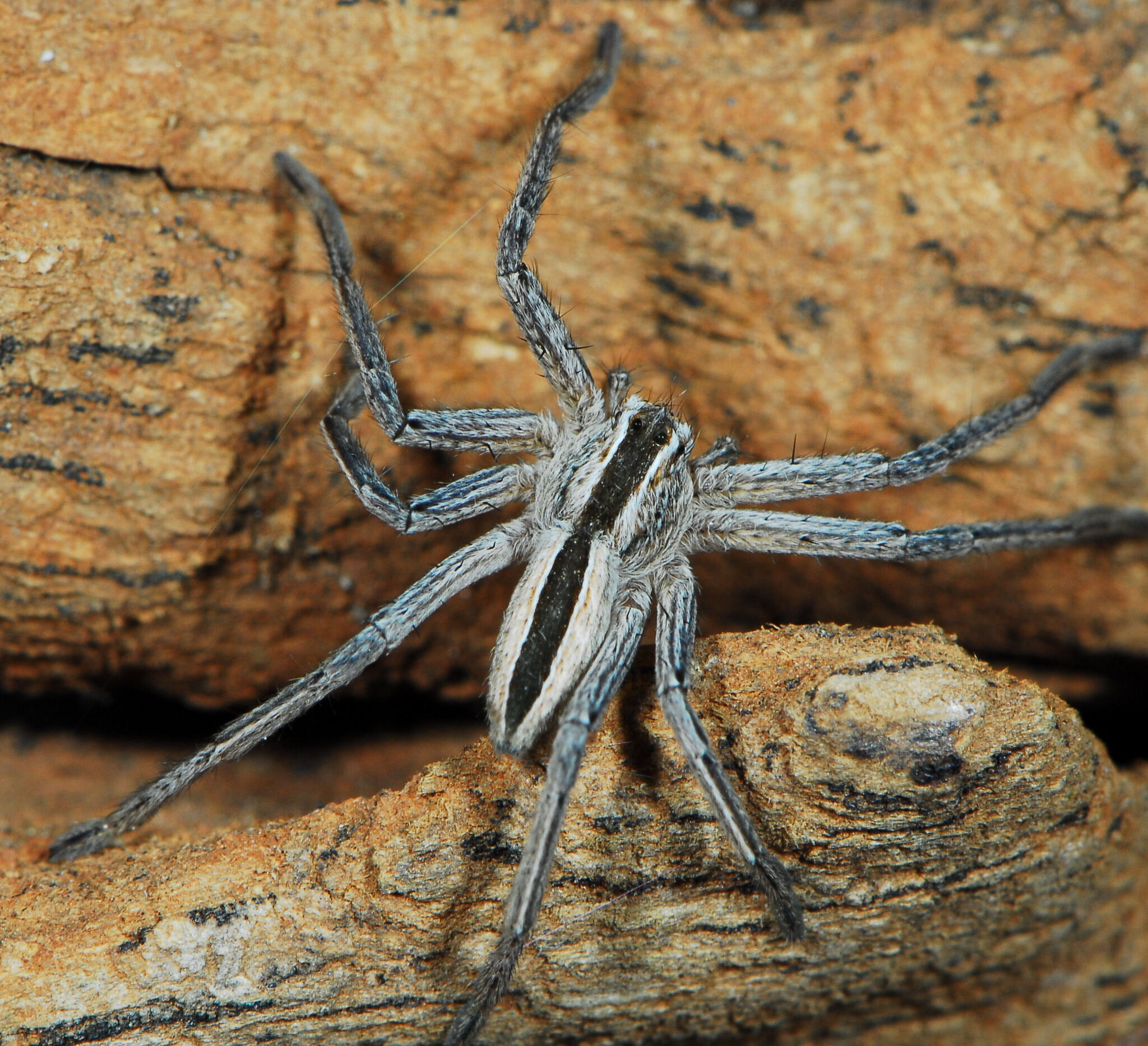
- Female P. longipes

Scientific classification
- Kingdom: Animalia
- Phylum: Arthropoda
- Subphylum: Chelicerata
- Class: Arachnida
- Order: Araneae
- Infraorder: Araneomorphae
- Family: Sparassidae
- Genus: Pseudomicrommata; Järvi, 1914

Type species
- P. longipes (Bösenberg & Lenz, 1895)

Species
- 5, see text

= Pseudomicrommata =

Genus of spiders

Pseudomicrommata (commonly known as grass huntsman spiders) is a genus of huntsman spiders that was first described by T. H. Järvi in 1914.

== Life style ==
Pseudomicrommata species build large nests in grass, frequently in the common African Eragrostis grasses. Their distribution pattern in southern Africa corresponds closely with that of Eragrostis.

Females construct a papery egg sac attached to grass leaves.

== Description ==
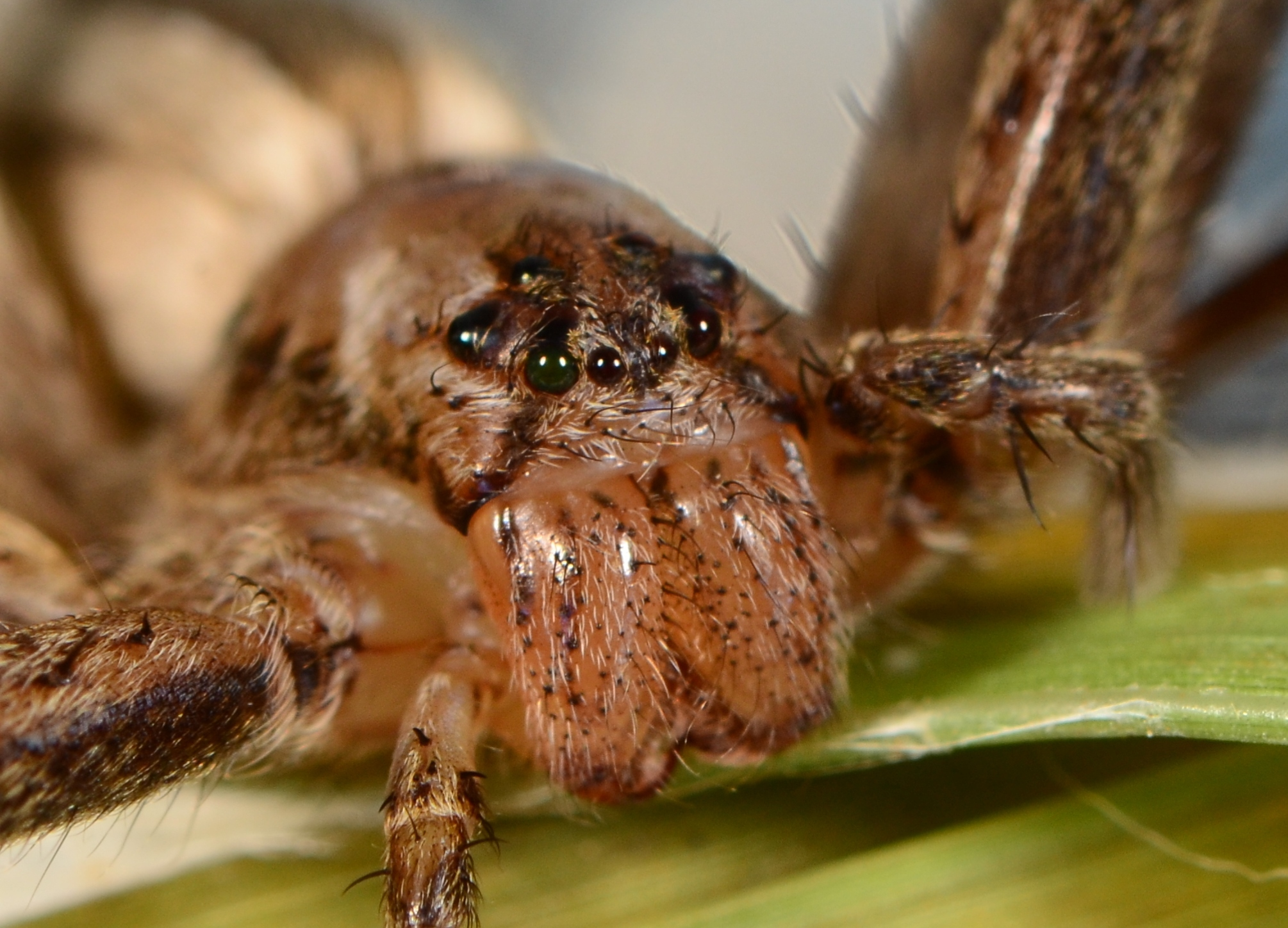
Female P. longipes

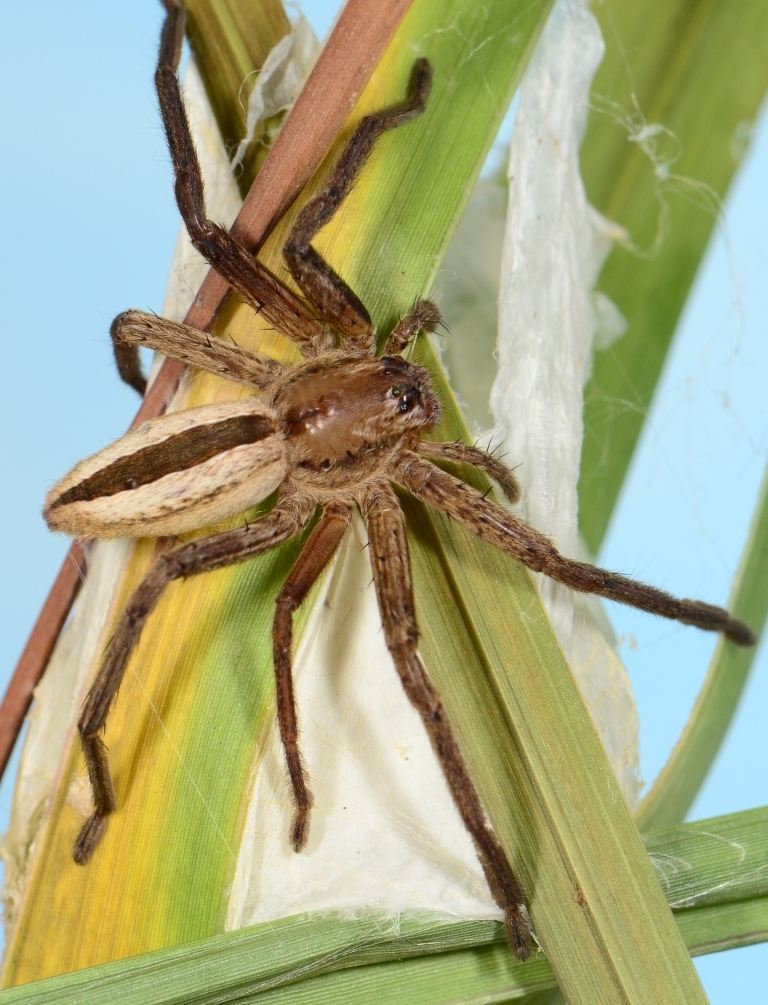
Female P. longipes

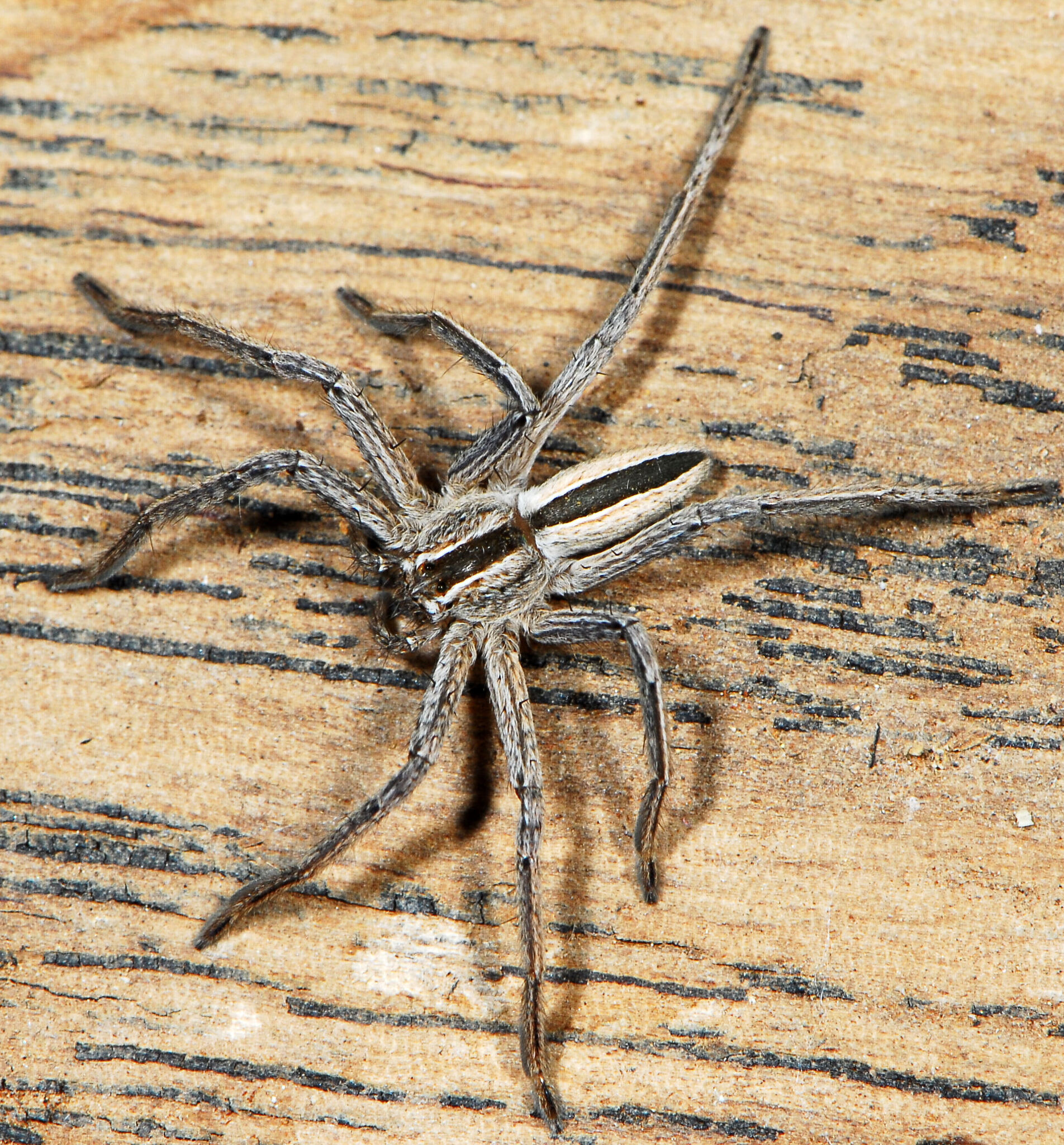
Female P. longipes

Pseudomicrommata species are small to medium-sized spiders.

The body background colour is pale grey or greenish-brown, with the prosoma and opisthosoma decorated mid-dorsally with a reddish-brown stripe. The carapace is slightly longer than wide and flat dorsally. There are two rows of eyes, with the anterior row recurved and the posterior row procurved. The anterior median eyes are smallest, with the remaining eyes subequal.

The chelicerae have two anterior and three to four posterior teeth. The posterior row has the first two teeth larger and one or two smaller teeth. The cheliceral furrow is without denticles.

The opisthosoma is elongated with a well-defined red-and-brown band along the body.

The leg formula is 4213 or 4231. There are three pairs of ventral tibial spines on legs I to IV.

== Taxonomy ==
The genus Pseudomicrommata was described by Järvi in 1912 and was revised by Moradmand in 2015. Of the five described species, four species are endemic to Africa, with one endemic to Iran.

== Species ==
As of September 2025, this genus includes five species:

- Pseudomicrommata longipes (Bösenberg & Lenz, 1895) – Kenya, Tanzania, Namibia, Botswana, Mozambique, South Africa (type species)
- Pseudomicrommata mary Moradmand, 2015 – Guinea, Ivory Coast
- Pseudomicrommata mokranica Moradmand, Zamani & Jäger, 2019 – Iran
- Pseudomicrommata schoemanae Moradmand, 2015 – Cameroon
- Pseudomicrommata vittigera (Simon, 1897) – Namibia, South Africa
