= Micrommata aragonensis =

Scientific classification
- Kingdom: Animalia
- Phylum: Arthropoda
- Subphylum: Chelicerata
- Class: Arachnida
- Order: Araneae
- Infraorder: Araneomorphae
- Family: Sparassidae
- Genus: Micrommata
- Species: M. aragonensis

Binomial name
- Micrommata aragonensis Urones, 2004

Species of spider

Micrommata aragonensis is a former (non-valid) spider species found in Spain. It was subsequently revised as a junior synonym of Micrommata formosa Pavesi, 1878
