= Sidyma apicalis =

Scientific classification
- Domain: Eukaryota
- Kingdom: Animalia
- Phylum: Arthropoda
- Class: Insecta
- Order: Lepidoptera
- Superfamily: Noctuoidea
- Family: Erebidae
- Subfamily: Arctiinae
- Genus: Sidyma
- Species: S. apicalis

Binomial name
- Sidyma apicalis Moore, 1878

Species of moth

Sidyma apicalis is a moth in the subfamily Arctiinae. It was described by Frederic Moore in 1878. It is found in Sikkim, India.
