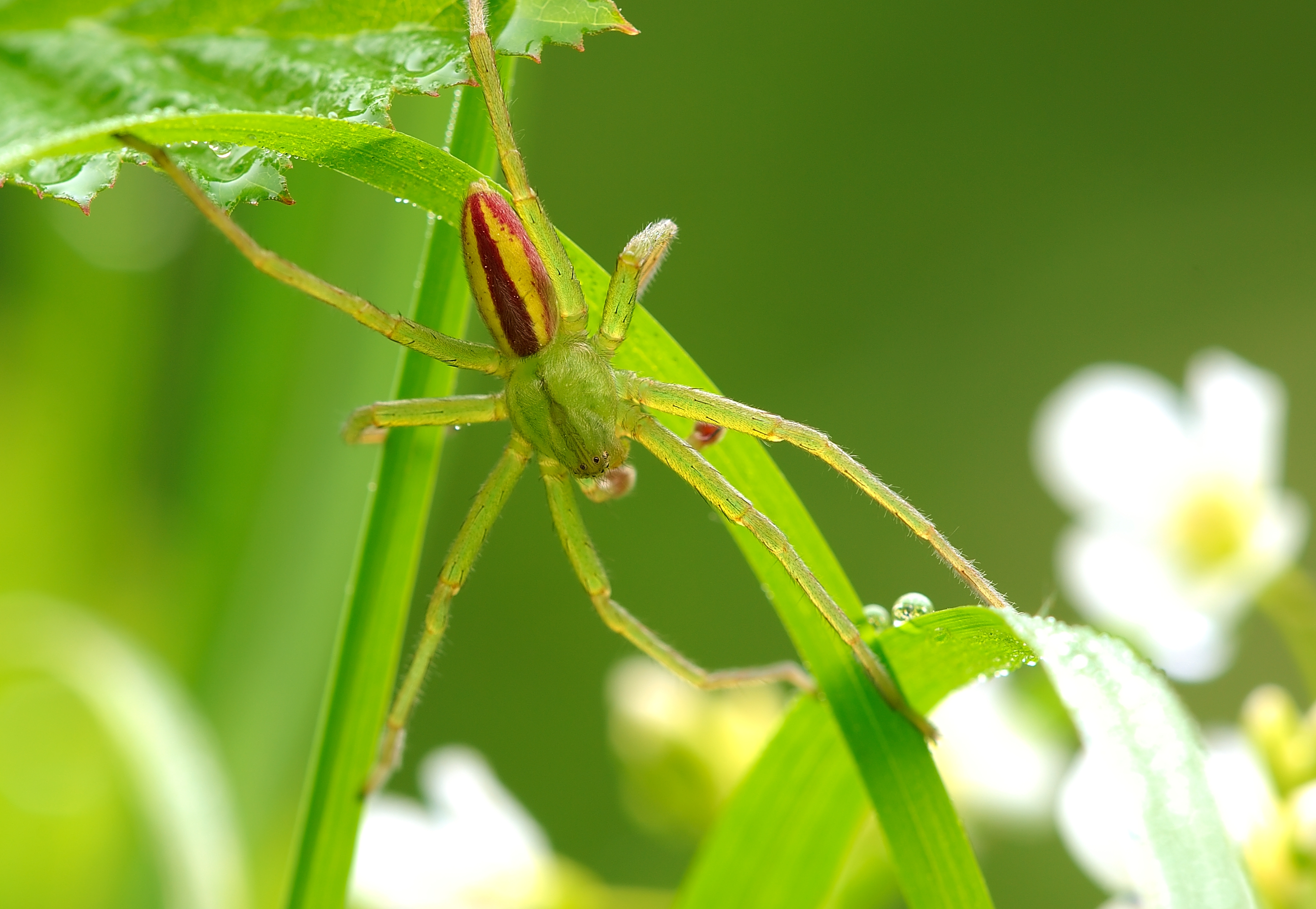
- Male of Micrommata virescens
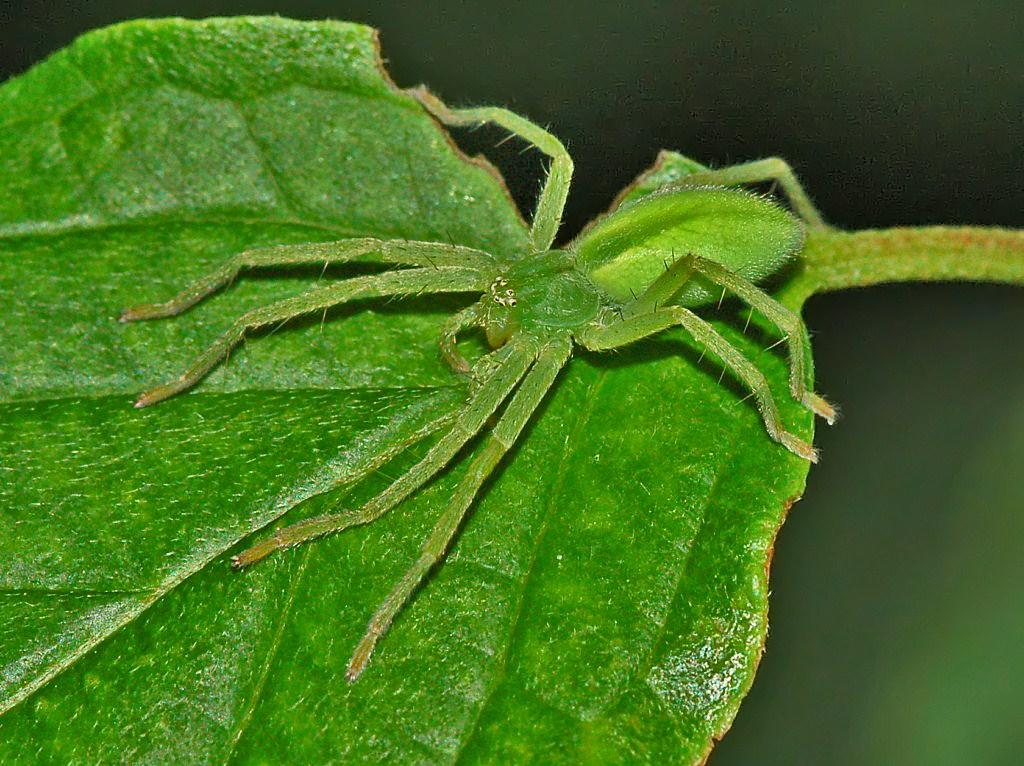
- Female of Micrommata virescens

Scientific classification
- Kingdom: Animalia
- Phylum: Arthropoda
- Subphylum: Chelicerata
- Class: Arachnida
- Order: Araneae
- Infraorder: Araneomorphae
- Family: Sparassidae
- Genus: Micrommata
- Species: M. virescens

Binomial name
- Micrommata virescens (Clerck, 1757)

Synonyms
- Aranea rosea; Aranea smaragdula; Aranea virescens; Aranea viridissima; Araneus roseus; Araneus virescens; Micrommata rosea; Micrommata roseum; Micrommata smaragdina; Micrommata viridissima; Micrommata viridissima valvulata; Sparassus smaragdulus; Sparassus roseus; Sparassus virescens

= Micrommata virescens =

Species of spider

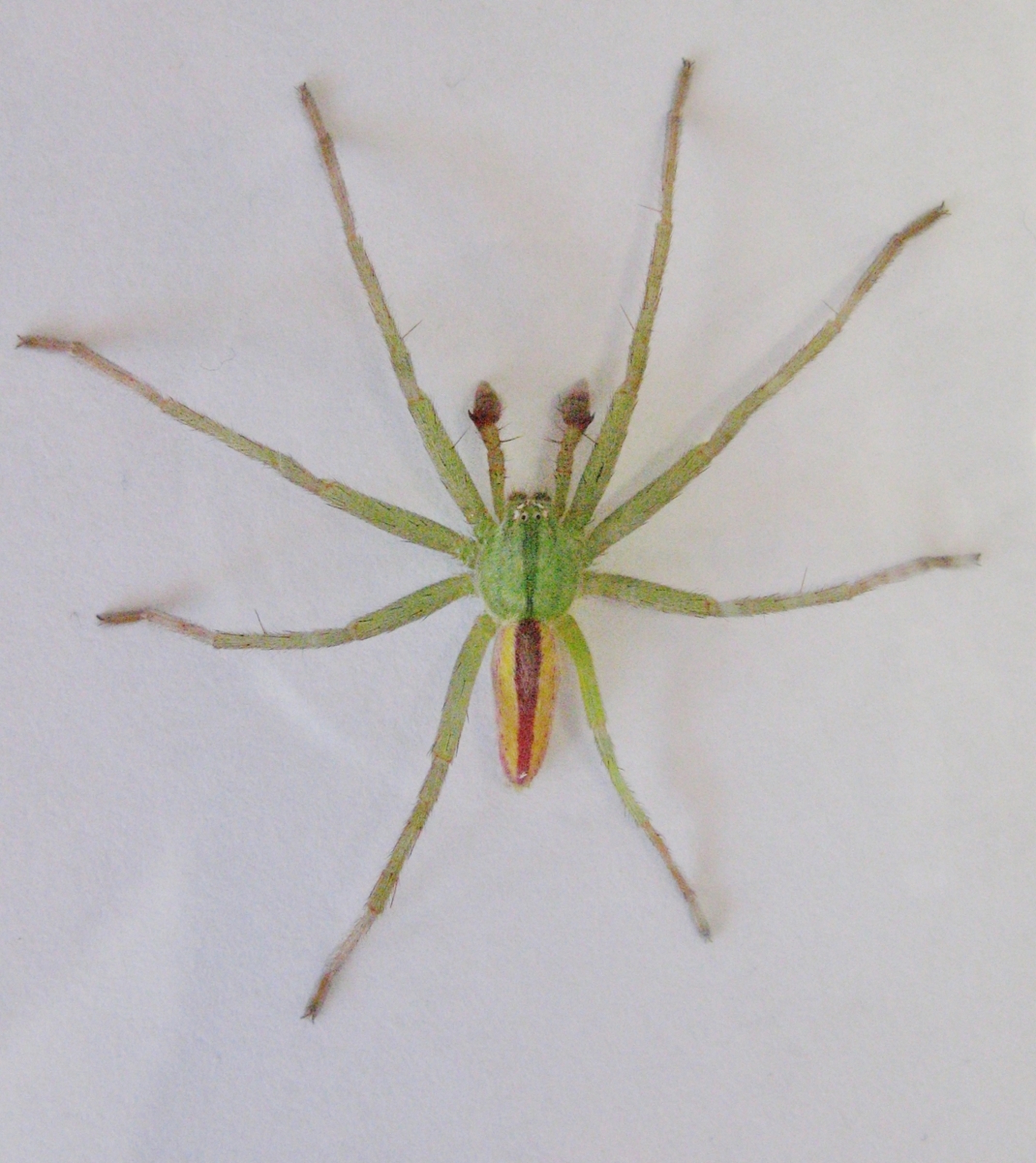
An adult male photographed from above. The red- and yellow-striped male colouration differs greatly from the cryptic green female. M. virescens is thus an example for sexual dichromatism, where strong differences in colouration are present between the sexes.

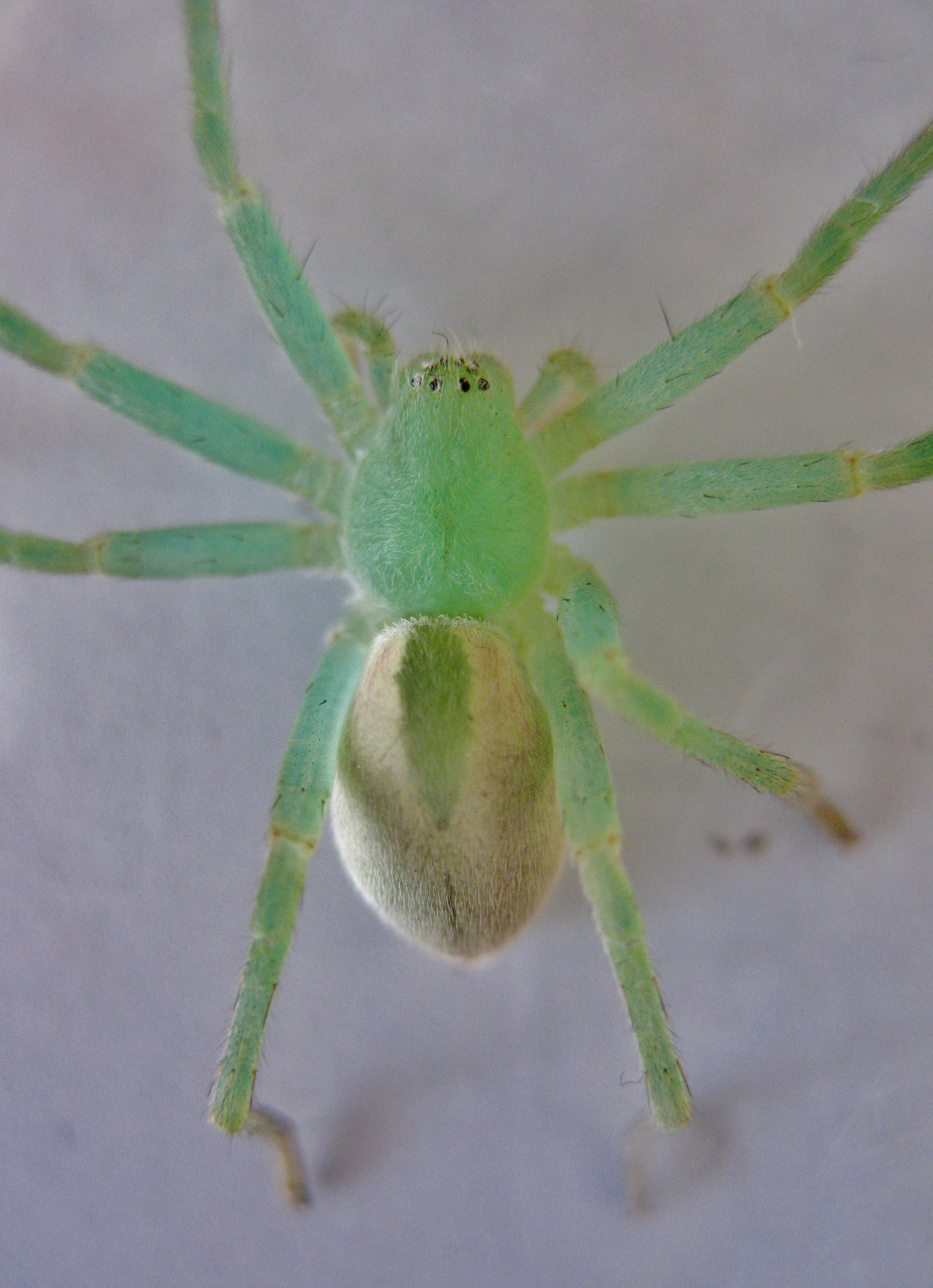
An adult female photographed from above. The central paraxial stripe may serve as a disruptive visual element.

Micrommata virescens, common name green huntsman spider, or emerald spider is a species of huntsman spiders belonging to the family Sparassidae.

== Distribution ==
This species has a Palearctic distribution. It occurs naturally in Northern and Central Europe, including Denmark and Britain.

== Description ==
In the females of Micrommata virescens, the body length can reach 12–16 millimetres (0.47–0.63 in), while in the males it is about 7–10 millimetres (0.28–0.39 in).

The cephalothorax and the long legs of the females are bright green, with a lighter green abdomen showing a darker green median stripe. The eight eyes are arranged in two rows and surrounded by white hairs. Males are dark green-olive and have a narrower abdomen, with red sides and a red to red-brown median stripe bordered yellow. Young spiders have a yellow-brown cephalothorax, with dark marginal and median stripes. Only after the last molting in the following spring the juveniles assume the typical coloration of the adults.

The green coloration is due to the bilin micromatabilin and its conjugates in haemolymph, interstitial tissues and the yolk of oocytes.

== Habitat ==
These characteristic huntsman spiders can be found at the edges of forests, in dry meadows, in damp woodland clearings and rides, where they prefer grass and the lower branches of trees.

== Biology ==
These spiders are mainly diurnal. Like many other spiders, they do not build a web, and hunt insects in green vegetation, where they rely on their camouflage. Their green color makes them very difficult to be detected by predators. They grow relatively slowly, taking 18 months to reach maturity. Females are fertile from May through to September. A few days after mating, the males die. In July, the females enclose the egg-sac into a few leaves stitched together. Cocoons are guarded by females. After about 4 weeks, eggs hatch about 40-50 young spiders.
