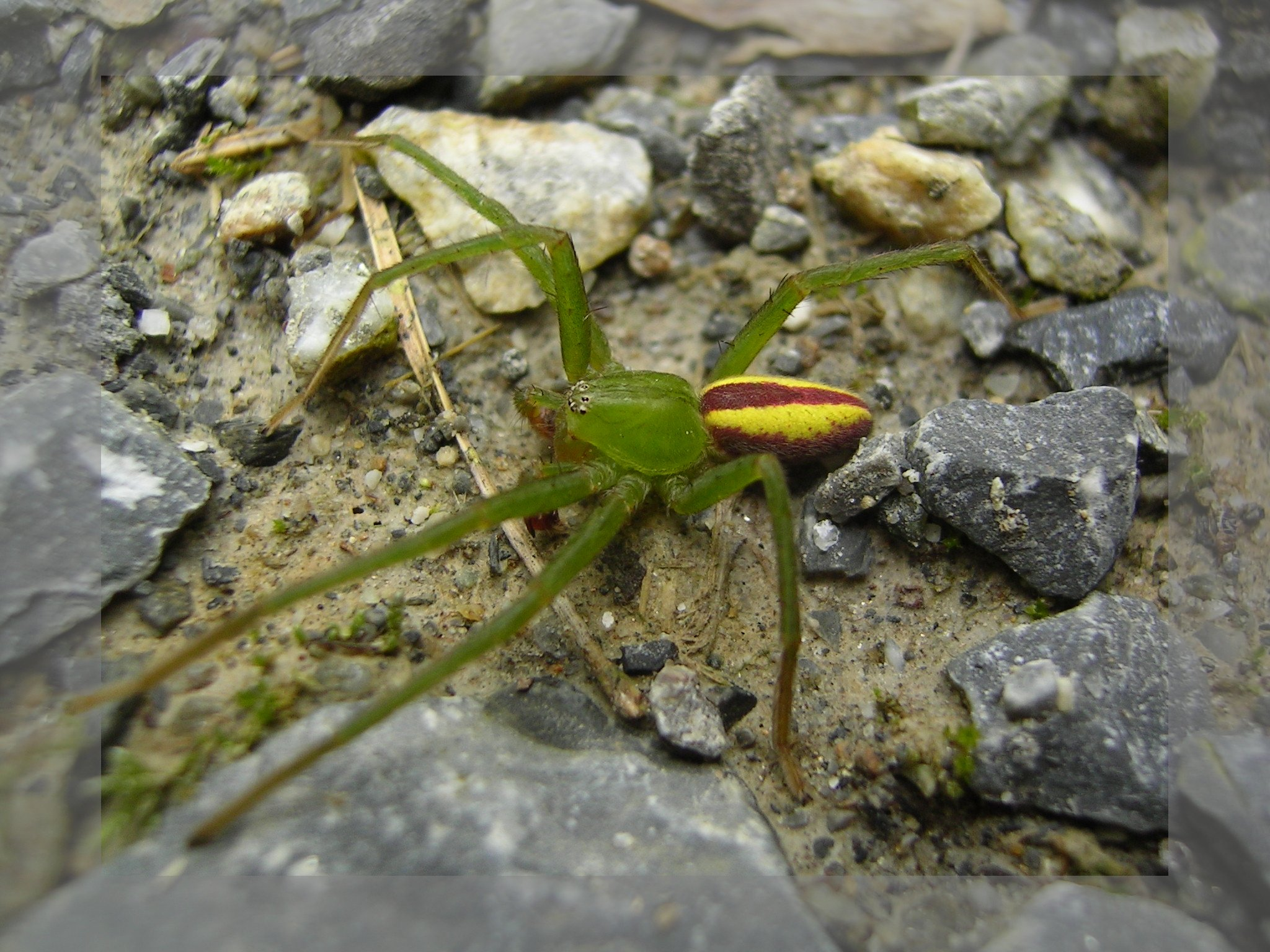
- M. virescens, male, on a gravel road in the Bernese Oberland, Switzerland

Scientific classification
- Kingdom: Animalia
- Phylum: Arthropoda
- Subphylum: Chelicerata
- Class: Arachnida
- Order: Araneae
- Infraorder: Araneomorphae
- Family: Sparassidae
- Genus: Micrommata; Latreille, 1804

Type species
- M. virescens (Clerck, 1757)

Species
- 7, see text

Synonyms
- Sparassus Walckenaer, 1805

= Micrommata =

Genus of spiders

Micrommata is a genus of huntsman spiders that was first described by Pierre André Latreille in 1804.

== Species ==
As of December 2024 it contains seven species (and one former subspecies), all with a palaearctic distribution, except for M. diesenhoff from Sierra Leone; and M. darlingi, endemic to Zimbabwe which can be misplaced:

- Micrommata aljibica Urones, 2004 – Spain
- Micrommata biggi Jäger, 2023 – Turkey, Armenia, Iraq, Iran, Turkmenistan
- Micrommata darlingi Pocock, 1901 – Zimbabwe
- Micrommata diesenhoff Jäger, 2023 – Sierra Leone
- Micrommata formosa Pavesi, 1878 – Mediterranean to Central Asia
- Micrommata ligurina (C. L. Koch, 1845) – Mediterranean to Central Asia
- Micrommata virescens (Clerck, 1757) (type) – Europe, Turkey, Caucasus, Russia (Europe Central Asia, to Far East (e.g. Korea, Japan) (including former Micrommata v. ornata (Walckenaer, 1802)).

(For Micrommata aragonensis Urones, 2004 see under Micrommata formosa).
