= Sidyma (moth) =

Scientific classification
- Domain: Eukaryota
- Kingdom: Animalia
- Phylum: Arthropoda
- Class: Insecta
- Order: Lepidoptera
- Superfamily: Noctuoidea
- Family: Erebidae
- Subfamily: Arctiinae
- Tribe: Lithosiini
- Genus: Sidyma; Walker, 1856

Genus of moths

Sidyma is a genus of moths in the subfamily Arctiinae. The genus was erected by Francis Walker in 1856.

== Species ==
- Sidyma apicalis Moore, 1878
- Sidyma albifinis Walker, 1856
