= Keilira =

Scientific classification
- Kingdom: Animalia
- Phylum: Arthropoda
- Subphylum: Chelicerata
- Class: Arachnida
- Order: Araneae
- Infraorder: Araneomorphae
- Family: Sparassidae
- Genus: Keilira; Hirst, 1989

Type species
- K. sparsomaculata Hirst, 1989

Species
- K. sokoli Hirst, 1989 – Australia (Victoria); K. sparsomaculata Hirst, 1989 – Australia (South Australia)

Genus of spiders

Keilira is a genus of Australian huntsman spiders that was first described by David B. Hirst in 1989. As of September 2019, it contains two species that are found in South Australia and Victoria: K. sokoli and K. sparsomaculata.
