= List of spiders of Sri Lanka =

The following list is of spiders recorded in Sri Lanka, a tropical island situated close to the southern tip of India.

== Spiders ==
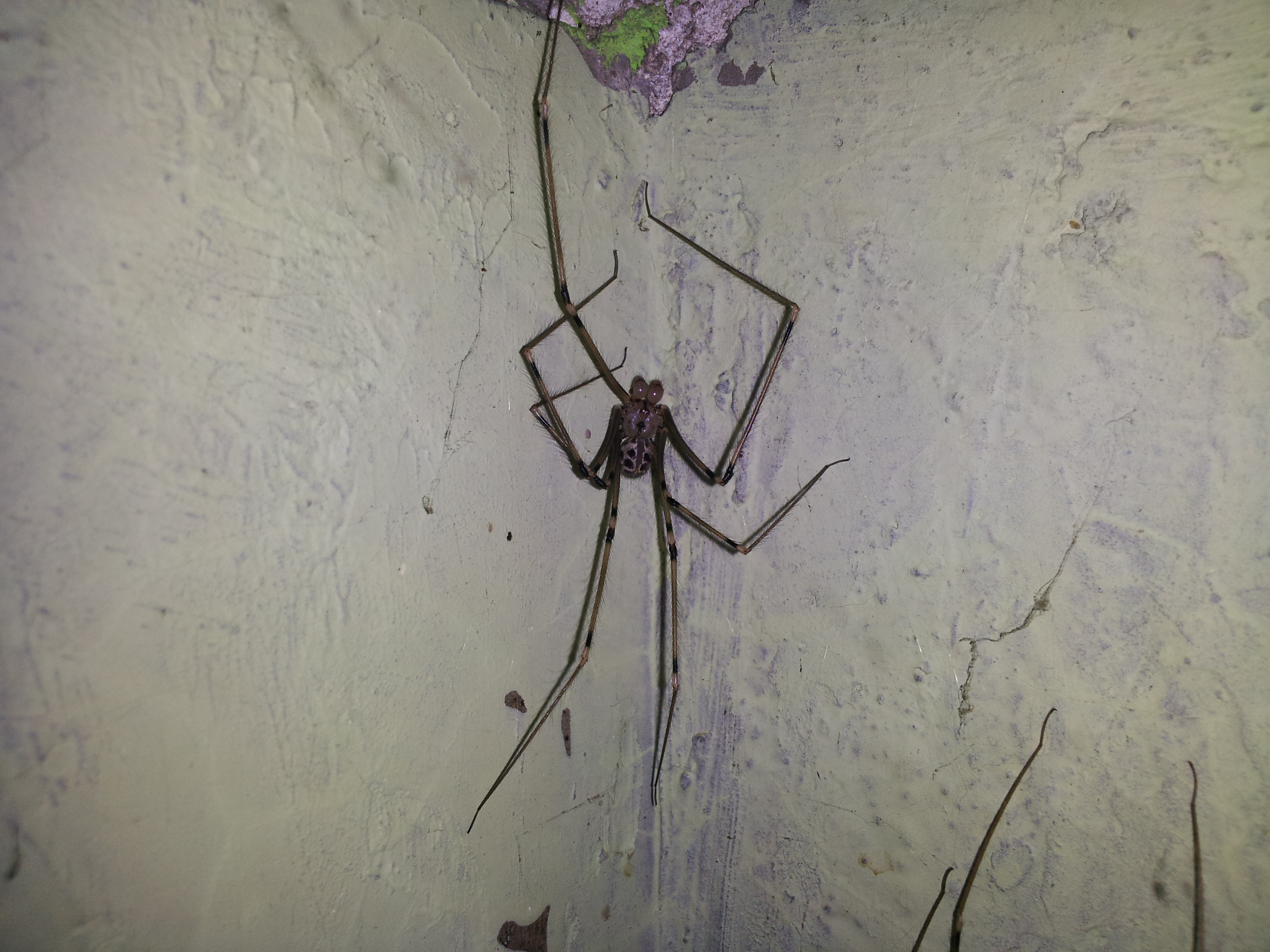
A Pholcidae species from Sri Lanka

Spiders (order Araneae) are air-breathing arthropods that have eight legs and chelicerae with fangs that inject venom. Anatomically, spiders differ from other arthropods in that the usual body segments are fused into two tagmata, the cephalothorax and abdomen, and joined by a small, cylindrical pedicel. Unlike insects, spiders do not have antennae. In all except the most primitive group, the Mesothelae, spiders have the most centralized nervous systems of all arthropods, as all their ganglia are fused into one mass in the cephalothorax. Unlike most arthropods, spiders have no extensor muscles in their limbs and instead extend them by hydraulic pressure.

As of November 2015, at least 45,700 spider species, and 114 families have been recorded by taxonomists. However, there has been dissension within the scientific community as to how all these families should be classified, as evidenced by the over 20 different classifications that have been proposed since 1900.

When considering the spider diversity in South Asia, which includes India, Pakistan, Bhutan, Bangladesh, Nepal, Maldives, and Sri Lanka, there are not much extensive spider taxonomy has revealed. Only in India, there is a precise catalogue of spiders are documented by arachnologists. All the other South Asian countries, the scientific study is much lesser than that of India. In Sri Lankan spider fauna, most of the articles and publications on spiders were done by Eugène Simon, C. L. Koch in the past and currently by Channa Bambaradeniya, K. B. Ranawana, V. A. M. P. K. Samarawickrama, Suresh P. Benjamin and Ranil P. Nanayakkara. However, most of them were interested on tiger spiders of Sri Lanka - genus Poecilotheria, not much work done in other spider categories.

In 2012 IUCN National Red List of Sri Lanka, much more comprehensive study on spiders and other local fauna had taken place. Afterwards, two books named An introduction to common Spiders of Sri Lanka and Tiger Spiders - Poecilotheria of Sri Lanka by Ranil P. Nanayakkara were published in 2014 and 2013 respectively. Numerous publications and checklists have been made up since then and curiosity about the arachnid fauna arose in the country. Three new jumping spiders were identified in 2016. In 2018, nine new goblin spiders were identified from the country. With that, Sri Lankan goblin spider diversity increased to 45 described species in 13 different genera. In 2019, the genus Phintelloides was identified. Also, a checklist by Manju Siliwal and Sanjay Molur's detailed Checklist of Spiders of South Asia including 2006 revision of Indian spider checklist was published. This checklist provided all the described spider species of South Asia and part of South-East Asia as well. However, this checklist was published in 2007, making it rather outdated. Several recent research in Sri Lanka is carried out by Prof. Suresh P. Benjamin. In 2021, eight species of jumping spiders were identified. In 2020, two cellar spiders, and seven species of jumping spiders were described. Five species belong to Mallinella were discovered in 2025. In 2024, two spiders species of the genus Meotipa were discovered. In 2025, six new species of palp footed spiders were described by Prof. Benjamin.

The following list provide the spiders currently identified in Sri Lanka. Due to being a very recent checklist, this list will be based on a checklist by Benjamin et al. (2012) among others, with the latest update being made in August 2020. This checklist was made by the Association for Conservation of Environment and Arthropods Sri Lanka, and encompasses a wide variety of referenced journals.

Currently, Sri Lanka has 595 species of spider, belonging to 50 families and 295 genera. Out of these 589 species, 324 are endemic spiders to Sri Lanka with 17 endemic genera.

Endemic species are denoted as E.

== Family: Agelenidae ==
- Funnel weavers

- Tegenaria domestica
- Tegenaria parietina

== Family: Anapidae ==
- Ground orbweavers

- Taphiasssa punctigera - E

== Family: Araneidae ==
- Orb weavers

- Acusilas coccineus
- Anepsion maritatum
- Arachnura scorpionoides
- Araneus minutalis
- Araneus mitificus
- Araneus obtusatus - E
- Argiope aemula
- Argiope aetherea
- Argiope anasuja
- Argiope catenulata
- Argiope pulchella
- Argiope taprobanica - E
- Caerostris indica
- Chorizopes frontalis
- Chorizopes mucronatus
- Clitaetra thisbe - E
- Cyclosa bifida
- Cyclosa insulana
- Cyclosa quinqueguttata
- Cyrtarachne perspicillata
- Cyrtarachne raniceps
- Cyrtophora cicatrosa
- Cyrtophora citricola
- Cyrtophora exanthematica
- Cyrtophora moluccensis
- Cyrtophora unicolor
- Eriovixia laglaizei
- Gasteracantha cancriformis
- Gasteracantha geminata
- Gasteracantha remifera
- Gea spinipes
- Gea subarmata
- Glyptogona duriuscula - E
- Herennia multipuncta
- Hypsosinga taprobanica - E
- Macracantha arcuata
- Mangora semiargentea - E
- Neogea nocticolor
- Neoscona enucleata
- Neoscona nautica
- Neoscona punctigera
- Neoscona theisi
- Neoscona vigilans
- Nephila pilipes
- Nephilengys malabarensis
- Ordgarius hobsoni
- Parawixia dehaani
- Poltys columnaris
- Poltys illepidus
- Thelacantha brevispina
- Ursa vittigera - E

== Family: Barychelidae ==
- Brushe-footed trapdoor spiders

- Diplothele halyi - E
- Plagiobothrus semilunaris - E
- Sason robustum
- Sipalolasma ellioti - E
- Sipalolasma greeni - E

== Family: Cheiracanthiidae ==
- Cheiracanth prowling spiders

- Cheiracanthium incertum - E
- Cheiracanthium indicum
- Cheiracanthium insigne
- Cheriacanthium melanostomum
- Cheiracanthium taprobanense - E

== Family: Clubionidae ==
- Sac spiders

- Clubonia drassodes
- Matidia flagellifera - E
- Matidia simplex - E
- Nusatidia bimaculata - E
- Simalio lucorum - E
- Simalio phaeocephalus - E

== Family: Corinnidae ==
- Ant-mimic and ground sac spiders

- Aetius decollatus
- Coenoptychus pulcher
- Copa annulata - E
- Copa spinosa - E
- Sphecotypus taprobanicus - E

== Family: Ctenidae ==
- Wandering spiders

- Ctenus ceylonensis - E
- Ctenus kandyensis - E
- Ctenus karschi - E
- Ctenus thorelli - E
- Diallomus fuliginosus - E
- Diallomus speciosus - E

== Family: Dictynidae ==
- Mesh web weavers

- Anaxibia nigricauda - E
- Atelolathys varia - E
- Dictyna turbida
- Ajmonia smaragdula - E
- Rhion pallidum - E

== Family: Dipluridae ==
- Diplurid funnel-web spiders

- Indothele dumicola
- Indothele lanka - E

== Family: Eresidae ==
- Velvet spiders

- Stegodyphus sarasinorum

== Family: Hahniidae ==
- Dwarf sheet spiders

- Alistra radleyi - E
- Alistra stenura - E
- Alistra taprobanica - E
- Hahnia oreophila - E
- Hahnia pusio - E

== Family: Hersiliidae ==
- Tree trunk spiders

- Hersilia pectinata
- Hersilia savignyi
- Hersilia sumatrana
- Hersilia tibialis
- Murricia crinifera - E
- Neotama variata - E
- Promurricia depressa - E

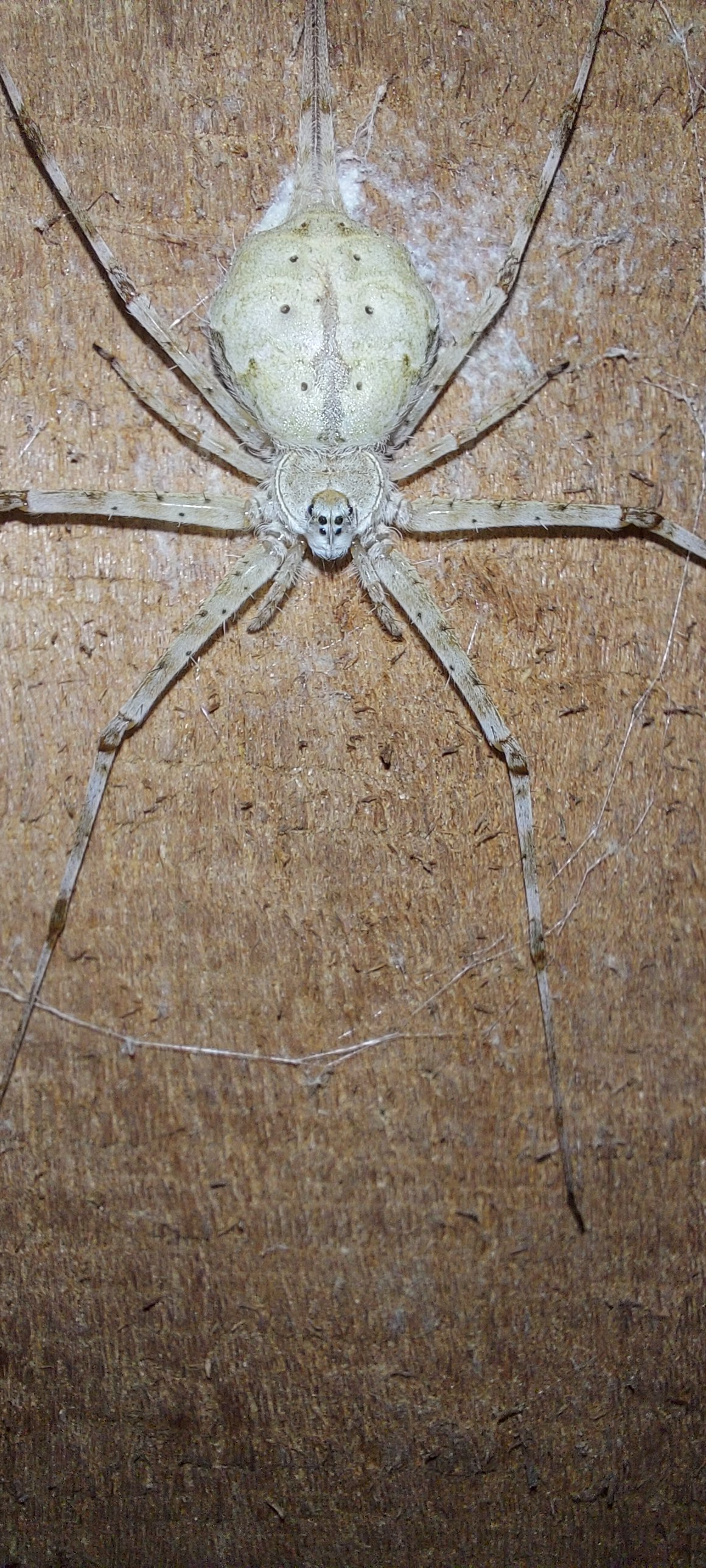
Hersilia sp.

== Family: Idiopidae ==
- Armored trapdoor spiders

- Heligmomerus taprobanicus - E
- Scalidognathus oreophilus - E
- Scalidognathus radialis - E

== Family: Linyphiidae ==
- Sheet web and dwarf spiders

- Atypena ellioti - E
- Atypena simoni - E
- Ceratinopsis monticola - E
- Helsdingenia ceylonica - E
- Labullinyphia tersa - E
- Microbathyphantes palmarius
- Nematogmus dentimanus
- Neriene katyae - E
- Nesioneta benoiti
- Obrimona tennenti - E
- Trematocephalus simplex - E
- Trematocephalus tripunctatus - E
- Typhistes antilope - E
- Typhistes comatus - E

== Family: Liocranidae ==
- Liocranid sac spiders

- Argistes seriatus - E
- Argistes velox - E
- Koppe armata - E
- Oedignatha affinis - E
- Oedignatha bicolor - E
- Oedignatha coriacea - E
- Oedignatha flavipes - E
- Oedignatha gulosa - E
- Oedignatha major - E
- Oedignatha montigena - E
- Oedignatha proboscidea - E
- Oedignatha retusa - E
- Oedignatha scrobiculata
- Oedignatha striata - E
- Paratus reticulatus - E
- Sphingius scutatus - E

== Family: Lycosidae ==
- Wolf spiders

- Draposa atropalpis
- Draposa lyrivulva
- Draposa subhadrae
- Hippasa greenalliae
- Hippasa olivacea
- Hogna lupina - E
- Lycosa indagatrix
- Lycosa nigrotibialis
- Lycosa yerburyi - E
- Ocyale lanca - E
- Ocyale pilosa
- Pardosa birmanica
- Pardosa palliclava - E
- Pardosa pseudoannulata
- Pardosa pusiola
- Pardosa semicana
- Pardosa sumatrana
- Pardosa timidula
- Wadicosa quadrifera
- Zoica parvula
- Zoica puellula

== Family: Mimetidae ==
- Pirate spiders

- Mimetus sagittifer - E
- Mimetus strinatii - E
- Phobetinus sagittifer - E

== Family: Mysmenidae ==
- Dwarf cobweb weavers

- Microdipoena saltuensis - E
- Phricotelus stelliger - E

== Family: Nemesiidae ==
- WIshbone spiders

- Atmetochilus fossor

== Family: Nesticidae ==
- Scaffold web spiders

- Nesticella aelleni - E

== Family: Ochyroceratidae ==
- Midget ground weavers

- Speocera taprobanica - E

== Family: Oecobiidae ==
- Flatmesh weavers

- Oecobius cellariorum

== Family: Oonopidae ==
- Flatmesh weavers

- Aprusia kataragama - E
- Aprusia koslandensis - E
- Aprusia rawanaellensis
- Aprusia strenuus - E
- Aprusia vankhedei - E
- Aprusia veddah - E
- Aprusia vestigator - E
- Brignolia ambigua - E
- Brignolia nigripalpis
- Brignolia ondaatjei - E
- Brignolia parumpunctata
- Brignolia ratnapura - E
- Brignolia shyami - E
- Brignolia sinharaja - E
- Brignolia trichinalis
- Camptoscaphiella simoni - E
- Cavisternum bom - E
- Gamasomorpha microps - E
- Gamasomorpha subclathrata - E
- Gamasomorpha taprobanica - E
- Grymeus dharmapriyai - E
- Ischnothyreus bipartitus - E
- Ischmothyreus chippy
- Ischnothyreus lymphaseus - E
- Opopaea mollis - E
- Opopaea spinosiscorona
- Orchestina dentifera - E
- Orchestina manicata
- Orchestina pilifera - E
- Orchestina tubifera - E
- Pelicinus marmoratus
- Pelicinus snooky - E
- Pelicinus tumpy - E
- Silhouettella saaristoi - E
- Silhouettella snippy - E
- Silhouettella tiggy - E
- Xestaspis kandy - E
- Xestaspis nuwaraeliya - E
- Xestaspis padaviya - E
- Xestaspis paulina - E
- Xestaspis pophami - E
- Xestaspis sublaevis - E
- Xyphinus baehrae

== Family: Oxyopidae ==
- Lynx spiders

- Oxyopes ceylonicus - E
- Oxyopes daksina
- Oxyopes hindostanicus
- Oxyopes javanus
- Oxyopes juvencus - E
- Oxyopes macilentus
- Oxyopes nilgiricus - E
- Oxyopes rufisternis - E
- Peucetia thalassina
- Peucetia viridana

== Family: Palpimanidae ==
- Palp-footed spiders

- Boagrius silindui - E
- Steriphopus hinnihamiae - E
- Steriphopus macleayi - E
- Steriphopus punchimenikae - E
- Steriphopus ritigalensis - E
- Steriphopus spiralus - E
- Steriphopus woolfi - E

== Family: Philodromidae ==
- Running crab spiders

- Gephyrota virescens - E
- Tibellus vitilis

== Family: Pholcidae ==
- Cellar spiders

- Artema atlanta
- Belisana badulla - E
- Belisana benjamini - E
- Belisana gowindahela
- Belisana keyti - E
- Belisana minneriya
- Belisana ratnapura - E
- Crossopriza lyoni
- Holocneminus multiguttatus
- Leptopholcus kandy
- Leptopholcus podophthalmus
- Micropholcus fauroti
- Modisimus culicinus
- Pholcus ceylonicus
- Pholcus fragillimus
- Pholcus metta - E
- Pholcus opilionoides
- Pholcus puranappui - E
- Pholcus uva - E
- Physocyclus globosus
- Smeringopus pallidus
- Tissahamia ethagala - E
- Thissahamia karuna - E
- Thissahamia kottawagamaensis - E
- Uthinia luzonica
- Wanniyala agrabopath - E
- Wanniyala badulla - E
- Wanniyala batatota - E
- Wanniyala hakgala - E
- Wanniyala labugama - E
- Wanniyala mapalena - E
- Wanniyala mudita - E
- Wanniyala ohiya - E
- Wanniyala orientalis - E
- Wanniyala upekkha - E
- Wanniyala viharakele - E

== Family: Pisauridae ==
- Nursery web spiders

- Dolomedes boiei
- Dolomedes karschi - E
- Nilus albocinctus
- Perenethis sindica
- Perenethis venusta
- Pisaura consocia

== Family: Psechridae ==
- Pseudo-orbweavers & Horizontal lace web weavers

- Fecenia macilenta
- Fecenia protensa
- Psechrus torvus

== Family: Salticidae ==
- Jumping spiders

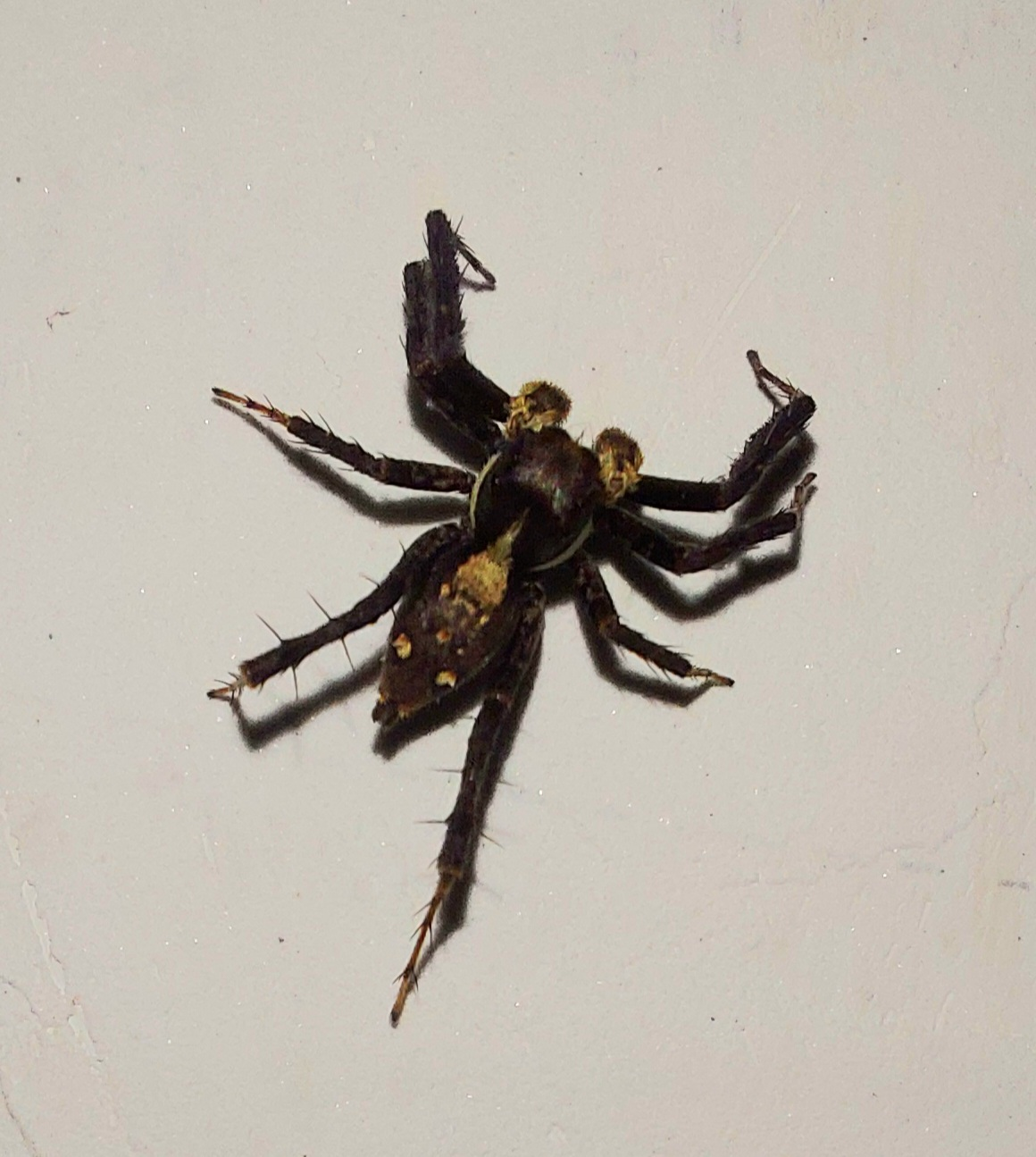
Portia sp.

- Aelurillus kronestedti
- Aelurillus quadrimaculatus
- Asemonea tenuipes
- Ballus segmentatus - E
- Ballus sellatus - E
- Bavirecta exilis - E
- Bavirecta flavopunctata - E
- Bianor angulosus
- Brancus calebi
- Brettus adonis - E
- Bristowia gandhii
- Carrhotus taprobanicus - E
- Carrhotus viduus
- Chrysilla lauta
- Chrysilla volupe
- Colaxes horton - E
- Colaxes wanlessi - E
- Cosmophasis olorina - E
- Curubis annulata - E
- Curubis erratica
- Curubis tetrica
- Epidelaxia albocruciata - E
- Epidelaxia albostellata - E
- Epidelaxia obscura - E
- Epocilla aurantiaca
- Euophrys declivis
- Euryattus bleekeri
- Euryattus breviusculus - E
- Evarcha cancellata
- Evarcha flavocincta
- Flacillula dothalugala - E
- Flacillula ellaensis - E
- Flacillula henryi - E
- Flacillula hodgsoni - E
- Flacillula johnstoni - E
- Flacillula lubrica - E
- Flacillula naipauli - E
- Flacillula piyasenai - E
- Gelotia lanka - E
- Habrocestum hantaneensis - E
- Habrocestum kodigalaensis - E
- Habrocestum ohiensis - E
- Habrocestum liptoni - E
- Harmochirus brachiatus
- Hasarius arcigerus - E
- Hasarius adansoni
- Hyllus semicupreus
- Icius disicatus - E
- Irura pulchra - E
- Jerzego bipartitus
- Macaroeris nidicolens
- Maevia roseolimbata - E
- Marengo crassipes
- Marengo inornata - E
- Marengo nitida - E
- Marengo rattotensis - E
- Marengo striatipes - E
- Menemerus bivittatus
- Menemerus fulvus
- Modunda aeneiceps
- Mogrus frontosus
- Myrmage dishani - E
- Myrmage imbellis - E
- Myrmaplata plataleoides
- Myrmarachne bicurvata - E
- Myrmarachne melanocephala
- Myrmarachne morningside - E
- Myrmarachne prava
- Myrmarachne ramunni
- Myrmarachne spissa - E
- Myrmarachne uniseriata
- Myrmarachne tristis
- Onomastus corbetensis - E
- Onomastus jamestaylori - E
- Onomastus maskeliya - E
- Onomastus nigricaudus - E
- Onomastus pethiyagodai - E
- Onomastus quinquenotatus - E
- Onomastus rattotensis - E
- Padillothorax taprobanicus - E
- Panachraesta paludosa - E
- Panysinus semiermis - E
- Phaeacius wanlessi
- Phausina bivittata - E
- Phausina flavofrenata - E
- Phausina guttipes - E
- Phintella argentea - E
- Phintella vittata
- Phintella bifurcilinia
- Phintella jaleeli - E
- Phintelloides alborea - E
- Phintelloides brunne - E
- Phintelloides flavoviri - E
- Phintelloides flavumi - E
- Phintelloides jesudasi
- Phintelloides orbisa - E
- Phintelloides multimaculata - E
- Phyaces comosus - E
- Plexippus paykulli
- Plexippus petersi
- Plexippus redimitus
- Portia albimana
- Portia fimbriata
- Portia labiata
- Proszynskia diatreta
- Ptocasius fulvonitens - E
- Rhene albigera
- Rhene flavicomans
- Rhene tamula - E
- Saitis chaperi
- Saitis kandyensis - E
- Schenkelia aurantia - E
- Sigytes paradisiacus - E
- Siler semiglaucus
- Simaetha cingulata - E
- Simaetha laminata - E
- Simaetha reducta - E
- Spartaeus spinimanus
- Stenaelurillus ilesai - E
- Stergusa aurata - E
- Stergusa aurichalcea - E
- Stergusa stelligera - E
- Synagelides hortonensis - E
- Synagelides lakmalii - E
- Synagelides orlandoi - E
- Synagelides rosalindae - E
- Tamigalesus fabus - E
- Tamigalesus munnaricus - E
- Telamonia dimidiata
- Telamonia sponsa - E
- Thiania bhamoensis
- Thiania pulcherrima
- Thyene coccinea
- Thyene imperialis
- Toxeus maxillosus
- Uroballus henicurus - E
- Uroballus octovittatus - E
- Viciria polysticta - E

== Family: Scytodidae ==
- Spitting spiders

- Scytodes fusca
- Scytodes lugubris
- Scytodes venusta

== Family: Segestriidae ==
- Tubeweb spiders

- Ariadna oreades - E
- Ariadna taprobanica - E

== Family: Selenopidae ==
- Wall crab spiders

- Selenops radiatus

== Family: Sicariidae ==
- Six-eyed brown spiders

- Loxosceles rufescens

== Family: Sparassidae ==
- Huntsman spiders

- Heteropoda eluta - E
- Heteropoda kandiana - E
- Heteropoda umbrata - E
- Heteropoda venatoria
- Olios ceylonicus - E
- Olios greeni - E
- Olios hirtus - E
- Olios lamarcki
- Olios milleti
- Olios punctipes
- Olios senilis
- Pandercetes decipiens
- Pandercetes plumipes
- Rhitymna occidentalis - E
- Spariolenus taprobanicus - E
- Stasina nalandica - E
- Stasina paripes - E
- Thelcticopis hercules - E

== Family: Stenochilidae ==
- Stecnochilid assassin spiders

- Stenochilus crocatus

== Family: Tetrablemmidae ==
- Armored spiders

- Brignoliella ratnapura - E
- Brignoliella scrobiculata - E
- Gunasekara ramboda - E
- Pahanga diyaluma - E
- Shearella lilawati - E
- Shearella selvarani - E
- Tetrablemma medioculatum - E

== Family: Tetragnathidae ==
- Long-jawed orb weavers

- Atelidea spinosa - E
- Dolichognatha albida
- Dolichognatha incanescens
- Dolichognatha nietneri - E
- Dolichognatha quinquemucronata - E
- Glenognatha dentata
- Guizygiella melanocrania
- Leucauge celesbania
- Leucauge decorata
- Leucauge ditissima
- Leucauge granulata
- Leucauge lamperti - E
- Leucauge undulata
- Mesida culta
- Opadometa fastigata
- Schenkeliella spinosa - E
- Tetragnatha armata - E
- Tetragnatha determinata - E
- Tetragnatha foveata
- Tetragnatha geniculata
- Tetragnatha gracilis
- Tetragnatha mandibulata
- Tetragnatha maxillosa
- Tetragnatha planata - E
- Tetragnatha tenera
- Tetragnatha virescens
- Tetragnatha viridorufa
- Tylorida striata
- Tylorida ventralis

== Family: Theraphosidae ==
- Tarantulas

- Chilobrachys nitelinus - E
- Plesiophrictus tenuipes - E
- Poecilotheria fasciata - E
- Poecilotheria hanumavilasumica
- Poecilotheria ornata - E
- Poecilotheria rajaei - E
- Poecilotheria smithi - E
- Poecilotheria subfusca - E
- Poecilotheria vittata - E

== Family: Theridiidae ==
- Cobweb spiders

- Argyrodes argentatus
- Argyrodes fissifrons
- Argyrodes flavescens
- Argyrodes nasutus - E
- Argyrodes scintillulanus
- Ariamnes pavesii
- Cephalobares globiceps
- Chikunia nigra
- Coleosoma blandum
- Chrysso spiniventris
- Coscinida gentilis - E
- Coscinida novemnotata - E
- Coscinida triangulifera
- Dipoena sertata - E
- Emertonella taczanowskii
- Enoplognatha oreophila - E
- Euryopis brevis
- Euryopis episinoides
- Janula taprobanica - E
- Kochiura aulica
- Latrodectus erythromelas
- Latrodectus hasselti
- Meotipa kudawaensis - E
- Meotipa spiniventris
- Meotipa sujii - E
- Molione trispinosa - E
- Moneta spinigera
- Nesticodes rufipes
- Nihonhimea mundula
- Parasteatoda tepidariorum
- Phoroncidia nasuta - E
- Phoroncidia septemaculeata
- Phoroncidia testudo
- Phoroncidia thwaitesi - E
- Phycosoma spundana
- Platnickina mneon
- Propostira quadrangulata - E
- Steatoda rufoannulata
- Theridion albomaculosum - E
- Theridion ceylonicus - E
- Theridion gabardi - E
- Theridion modestum - E
- Theridion nilgherinum
- Theridion nodiferum - E
- Theridion quadratum
- Theridion teliferum - E
- Theridula gonygaster
- Theridula opulenta
- Thwaitesia margaritifera

== Family: Theridiosomatidae ==
- Ray spiders

- Andasta semiargentea - E
- Ogulnius pullus
- Theridiosoma genevensium - E

== Family: Thomisidae ==
- Crab spiders

- Amyciaea forticeps
- Boliscus decipiens - E
- Borboropactus asper - E
- Camaricus formosus
- Cebrenninus striatipes
- Cymbacha simplex - E
- Diaea placata - E
- Epidius longipalpis
- Epidius parvati - E
- Holopelus piger - E
- Indoxysticus minutus
- Lysiteles catulus
- Monaeses attenuatus - E
- Monaeses cinerascens
- Monaeses greeni - E
- Oxytate subvirens - E
- Oxytate taprobane - E
- Pagida salticiformis - E
- Phrynarachne ceylonica
- Phrynarachne decipiens
- Phrynarachne fatalis - E
- Phrynarachne rothschildi - E
- Platythomisus sudeepi
- Runcinia bifrons
- Stiphropus sigillatus - E
- Tagulis mystacinus - E
- Talaus oblitus - E
- Tarrocanus capra - E
- Tarrocanus jaffnaensis - E
- Thomisus callidus
- Thomisus elongatus
- Thomisus granulifrons
- Thomisus pugilis
- Thomisus spectabilis
- Thomisus stoliczkai
- Tmarus fasciolatus
- Tmarus taiwanus
- Tmarus hystrix - E
- Tmarus hiyarensis - E
- Tmarus viridomaculatus - E
- Tmarus manojkaushalyai

== Family: Titanoecidae ==
- Rock weavers

- Pandava laminata

== Family: Trachelidae ==
- Trachelid ground spiders

- Orthobula impressa
- Trachelas oreophilus
- Trachelas quisquiliarum - E
- Utivarachna accentuata - E

== Family: Udubidae ==
- Udubid spiders

- Campostichomma alawala - E
- Campostichomma harasbedda - E
- Campostichomma manicatum - E
- Campostichomnma mudduk - E

== Family: Uloboridae ==
- Cribellate orb weavers

- Hyptiotes analis - E
- Miagrammopes ferdinandi - E
- Miagrammopes thwaitesi
- Uloborus bigibbosus
- Uloborus umboniger - E
- Zosis geniculata

== Family: Zodariidae ==
- Ant spider

- Cryptothele ceylonica - E
- Habronestes bradleyi
- Hermippus cruciatus
- Mallinella dhanahami - E
- Mallinella milkyway - E
- Mallinella moncheri - E
- Mallinella oreo - E
- Mallinella truffles - E
- Suffasia attidiya - E
- Suffasia mahasumana - E

== Family: Zoropsidae ==
- False wolf spiders

- Devendra amaiti - E
- Devendra pardalis - E
- Devendra pumilus - E
- Devendra saama - E
- Devendra seriatus - E
