= Obrima (disambiguation) =

The genus name Obrima has been used for moths and spiders:

- Obrima, a genus of moths in the family Erebidae
- Obrima (spider), now classified as Obrimona in the family Linyphiidae
