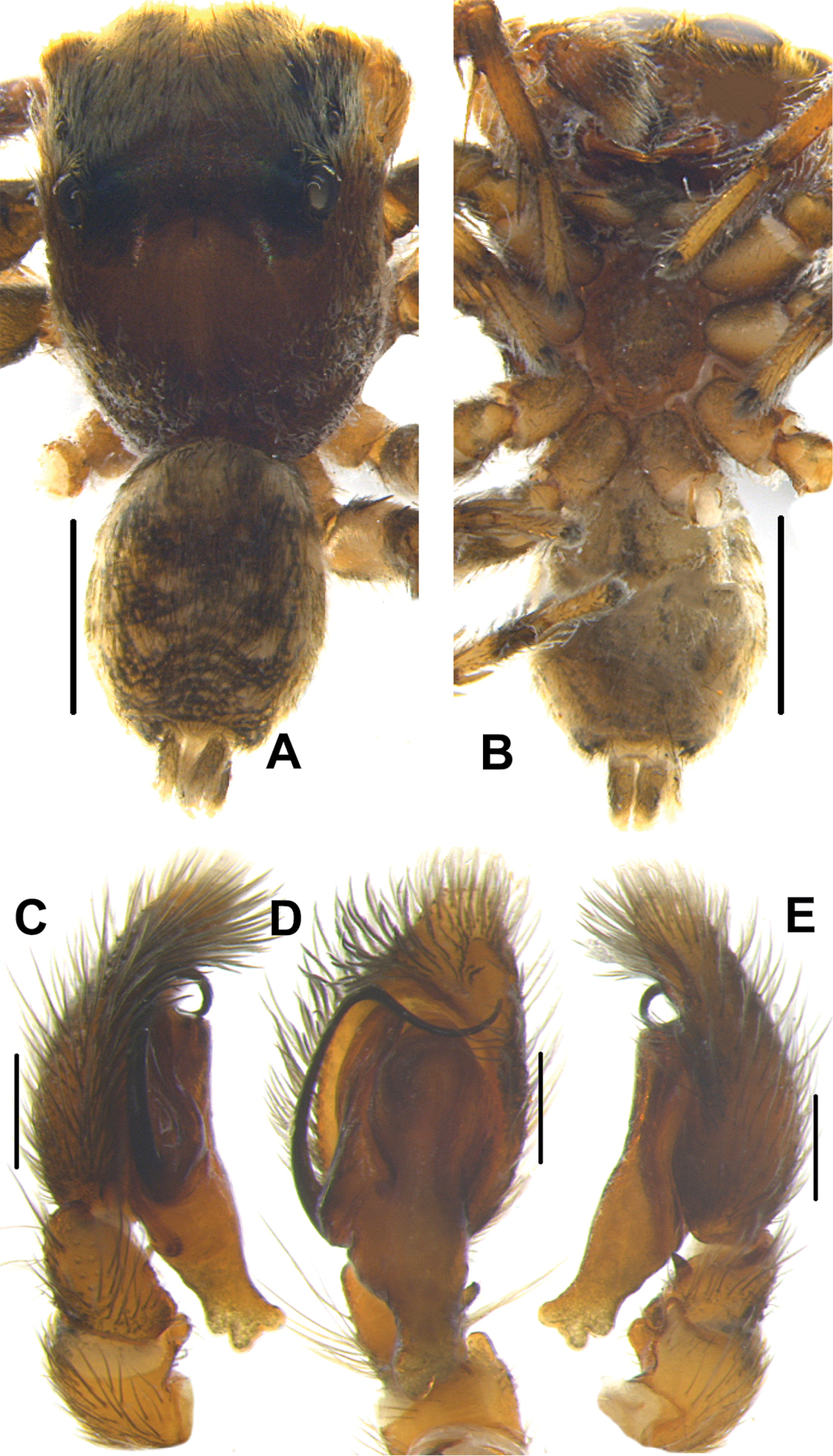
- Tamigalesus munnaricus

Scientific classification
- Kingdom: Animalia
- Phylum: Arthropoda
- Subphylum: Chelicerata
- Class: Arachnida
- Order: Araneae
- Infraorder: Araneomorphae
- Family: Salticidae
- Subfamily: Salticinae
- Genus: Tamigalesus; Żabka, 1988

= Tamigalesus =

Genus of spiders

Tamigalesus is a genus of spiders in the family Salticidae. It is found in India and Sri Lanka.

== Species ==
It contains two species:

- Tamigalesus munnaricus (Żabka, 1988) India, Sri Lanka
- Tamigalesus fabus (Kanesharatnam & Benjamin, 2020) Sri Lanka
