= Tarrocanus =

Scientific classification
- Kingdom: Animalia
- Phylum: Arthropoda
- Subphylum: Chelicerata
- Class: Arachnida
- Order: Araneae
- Infraorder: Araneomorphae
- Family: Thomisidae
- Genus: Tarrocanus; Simon, 1895

Type species
- Tarrocanus capra Simon, 1895

Species
- See text

Diversity
- 2 species

Genus of spiders

Tarrocanus is a genus of crab spiders in the family Thomisidae, containing only two species.

== Species ==
- Tarrocanus capra Simon, 1895 — Sri Lanka
- Tarrocanus viridis Dyal, 1935 — Pakistan
