= Pagida =

Scientific classification
- Kingdom: Animalia
- Phylum: Arthropoda
- Subphylum: Chelicerata
- Class: Arachnida
- Order: Araneae
- Infraorder: Araneomorphae
- Family: Thomisidae
- Genus: Pagida; Simon, 1895

Type species
- Pagida salticiformis (O. Pickard-Cambridge, 1883)

Species
- See text

Diversity
- 3 species

Genus of spiders

Pagida is a genus of crab spiders in the family Thomisidae, containing only three species.

== Species ==
- Pagida minuta Benjamin & Clayton, 2016 — Borneo
- Pagida pseudorchestes (Thorell, 1890) — Sumatra
- Pagida salticiformis (O. P.-Cambridge, 1883) — Sri Lanka
