= Epidelaxia =

Scientific classification
- Kingdom: Animalia
- Phylum: Arthropoda
- Subphylum: Chelicerata
- Class: Arachnida
- Order: Araneae
- Infraorder: Araneomorphae
- Family: Salticidae
- Subfamily: Salticinae
- Genus: Epidelaxia; Simon, 1902

Type species
- E. albostellata Simon, 1902

Species
- 4, see text

Genus of spiders

Epidelaxia is a genus of Asian jumping spiders that was first described by Eugène Louis Simon in 1902. Once considered completely endemic to Sri Lanka, additional species were discovered from Philippines in 2016 and from India in 2025

== Species ==
As of June 2019 it contains four species, found only in Asia:

- Epidelaxia albocruciata Simon, 1902 – Sri Lanka
- Epidelaxia albostellata Simon, 1902 (type) – Sri Lanka
- Epidelaxia falciformis Asima, Caleb, Prasad & Joseph, 2025 – India
- Epidelaxia maurerae Freudenschuss & Seiter, 2016 – Philippines
- Epidelaxia obscura Simon, 1902 – Sri Lanka
- Epidelaxia palustris Asima, Caleb, Prasad & Joseph, 2025 – India
