= Epidelaxia falciformis =

Scientific classification
- Kingdom: Animalia
- Phylum: Arthropoda
- Subphylum: Chelicerata
- Class: Arachnida
- Order: Araneae
- Infraorder: Araneomorphae
- Family: Salticidae
- Genus: Epidelaxia
- Species: E. falciformis

Binomial name
- Epidelaxia falciformis Asima, Caleb, Prasad & Joseph, 2025

Species of spider

Epidelaxia falciformis is a species of spider belonging to the genus Epidelaxia. It was described from the state of Kerala in India. The species name refers to the sickle shaped embolus tip of this spider.
