= Phausina =

Scientific classification
- Kingdom: Animalia
- Phylum: Arthropoda
- Subphylum: Chelicerata
- Class: Arachnida
- Order: Araneae
- Infraorder: Araneomorphae
- Family: Salticidae
- Subfamily: Salticinae
- Genus: Phausina; Simon, 1902

Type species
- P. flavofrenata Simon, 1902

Species
- 4, see text

Genus of spiders

Phausina is a genus of Asian jumping spiders that was first described by Eugène Louis Simon in 1902.

Male P. leucopogon have a black carapace, red hairs surrounding a broad band of yellow hairs on the head, and reddish hairs surrounding a narrow median stripe of whitish hairs on the thorax with a wavy whitish stripe on the side. The abdomen is black-ish with red pubescence and a median white and yellow band. The first two pairs of legs are dark, the others yellowish with rings. They are 5 millimetres (0.20 in) long

== Species ==
As of August 2019 it contains four species, found only in Asia:

- Phausina bivittata Simon, 1902 – Sri Lanka
- Phausina flavofrenata Simon, 1902 (type) – Sri Lanka
- Phausina guttipes Simon, 1902 – Sri Lanka
- Phausina leucopogon Simon, 1905 – Indonesia (Java)
