= Epidelaxia palustris =

Scientific classification
- Kingdom: Animalia
- Phylum: Arthropoda
- Subphylum: Chelicerata
- Class: Arachnida
- Order: Araneae
- Infraorder: Araneomorphae
- Family: Salticidae
- Genus: Epidelaxia
- Species: E. palustris

Binomial name
- Epidelaxia palustris Asima, Caleb, Prasad & Joseph, 2025

Species of spider

Epidelaxia palustris is a species of spider belonging to the genus Epidelaxia. It was described from a specimen collected from the Myristica swamps of Kerala in India. The species phrase palus was derived from the Latin name for swamp, the habitat type from where this spider was first collected.
