= Cephalobares =

Scientific classification
- Kingdom: Animalia
- Phylum: Arthropoda
- Subphylum: Chelicerata
- Class: Arachnida
- Order: Araneae
- Infraorder: Araneomorphae
- Family: Theridiidae
- Genus: Cephalobares; O. Pickard-Cambridge, 1871

Type species
- C. globiceps O. Pickard-Cambridge, 1871

Species
- C. globiceps O. Pickard-Cambridge, 1871 – Sri Lanka, China; C. yangdingi Gao & Li, 2010 – China

Genus of spiders

Cephalobares is a genus of Asian comb-footed spiders that was first described by Octavius Pickard-Cambridge in 1871. As of May 2020 it contains two species, found in Asia: C. globiceps and C. yangdingi.
