= Ocyale lanca =

Scientific classification
- Kingdom: Animalia
- Phylum: Arthropoda
- Subphylum: Chelicerata
- Class: Arachnida
- Order: Araneae
- Infraorder: Araneomorphae
- Family: Lycosidae
- Genus: Ocyale
- Species: O. lanca

Binomial name
- Ocyale lanca (Karsch, 1879)

Species of spider

Ocyale lanca, is a species of spider of the genus Ocyale. It is endemic to Sri Lanka.
