= Olios ceylonicus =

Scientific classification
- Kingdom: Animalia
- Phylum: Arthropoda
- Subphylum: Chelicerata
- Class: Arachnida
- Order: Araneae
- Infraorder: Araneomorphae
- Family: Sparassidae
- Genus: Olios
- Species: O. ceylonicus

Binomial name
- Olios ceylonicus (Leardi, 1902)

Species of spider

Olios ceylonicus is a species of spider of the genus Olios. It is endemic to Sri Lanka. It is part of the huntsman spider family Sparassidae.
