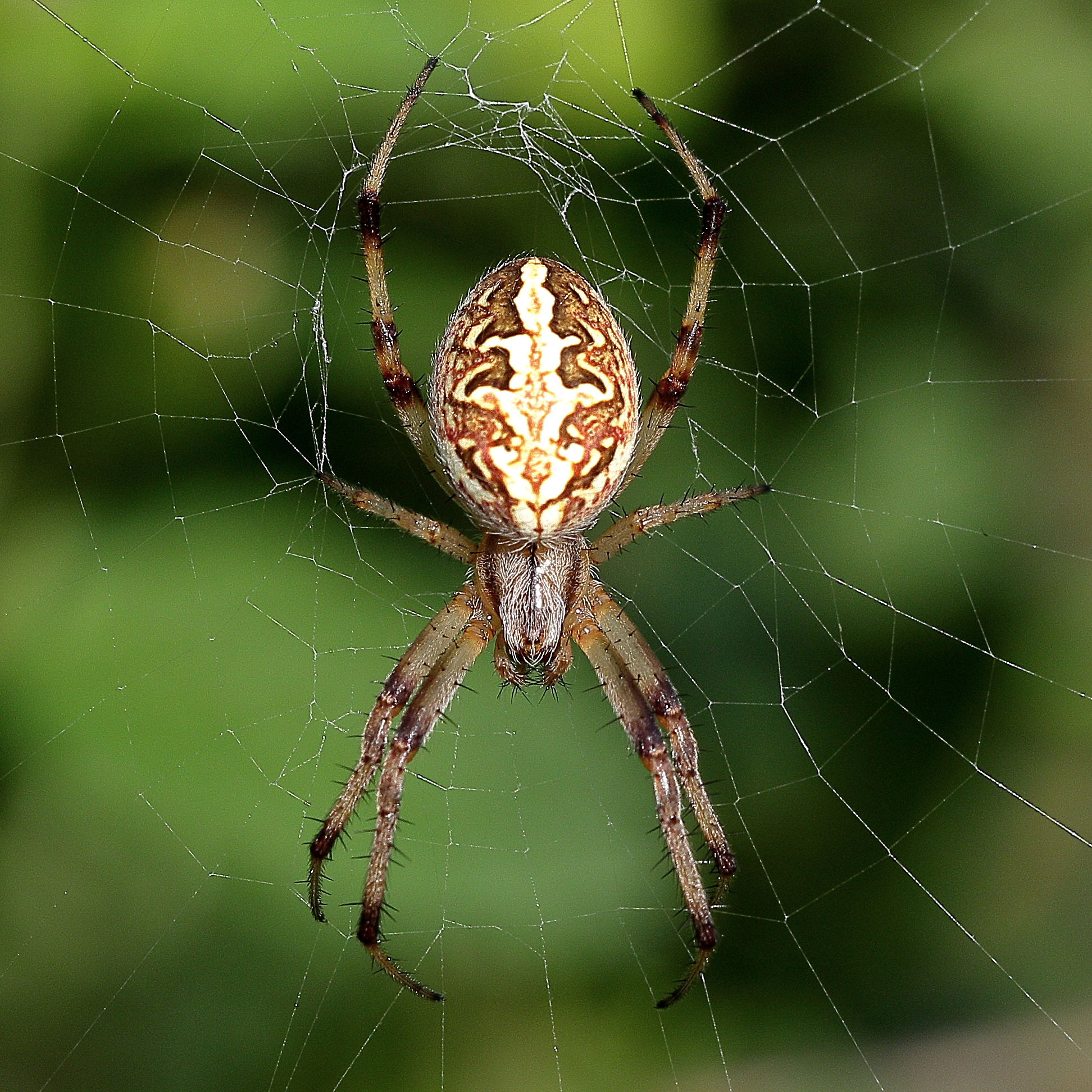
- Female in Cairns, Australia
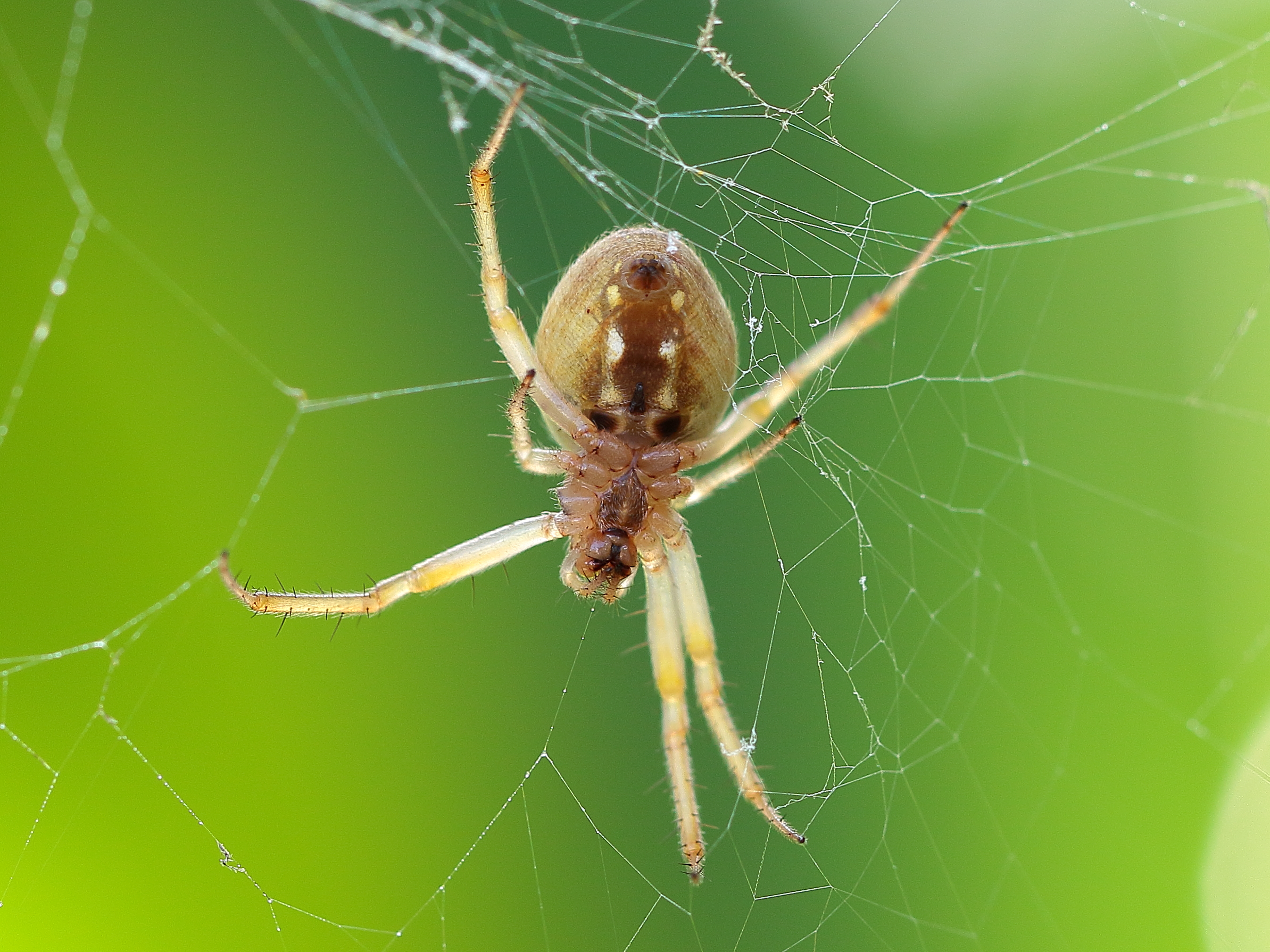
- Female ventral

Scientific classification
- Kingdom: Animalia
- Phylum: Arthropoda
- Subphylum: Chelicerata
- Class: Arachnida
- Order: Araneae
- Infraorder: Araneomorphae
- Family: Araneidae
- Genus: Neoscona
- Species: N. theisi

Binomial name
- Neoscona theisi Walckenaer, 1841

= Neoscona theisi =

Species of spider

Neoscona theisi is a species of spider in the family Araneidae. Spiders in the genus Neoscona have a mostly pantropical distribution.

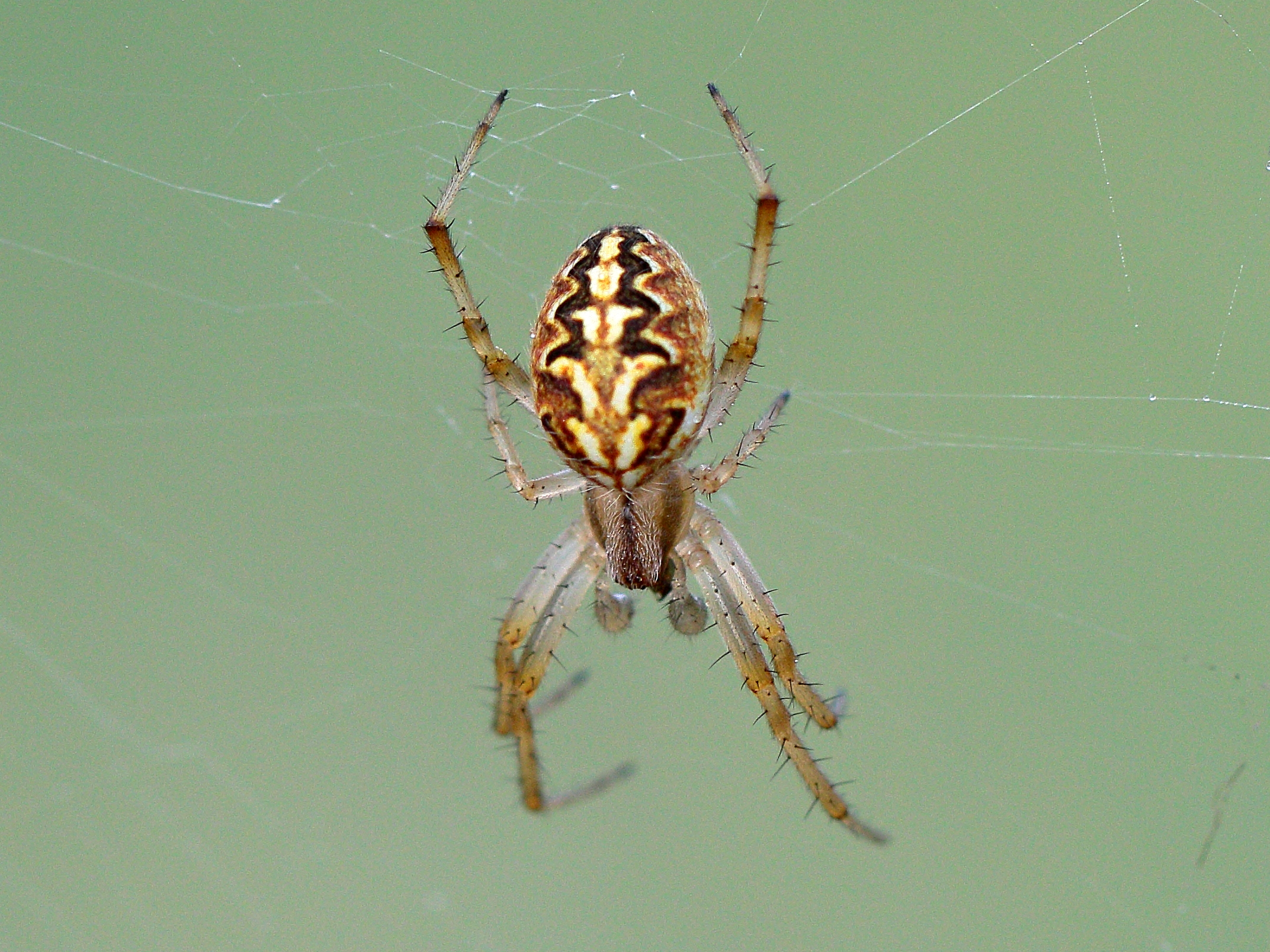
Male dorsal

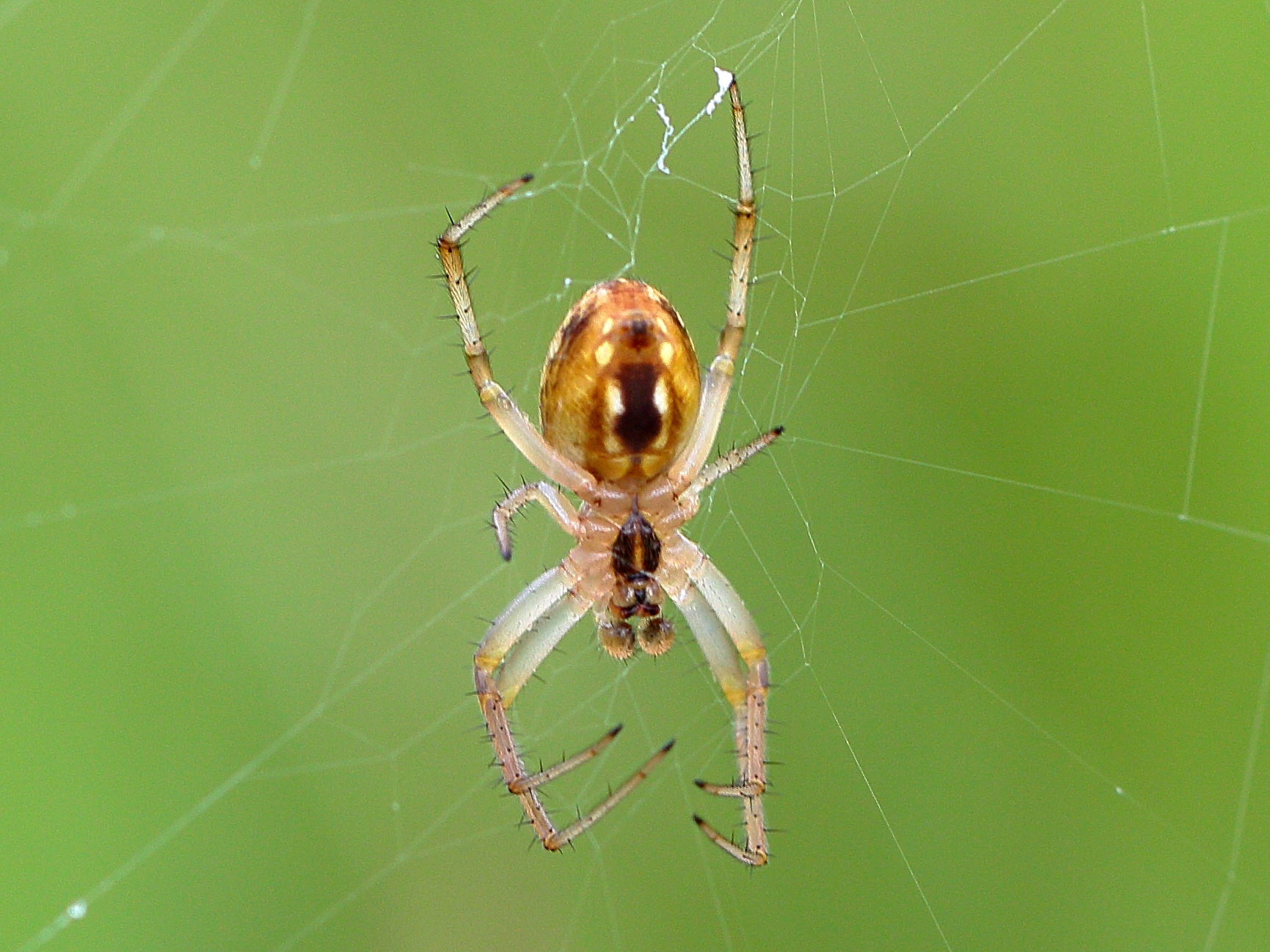
Male ventral

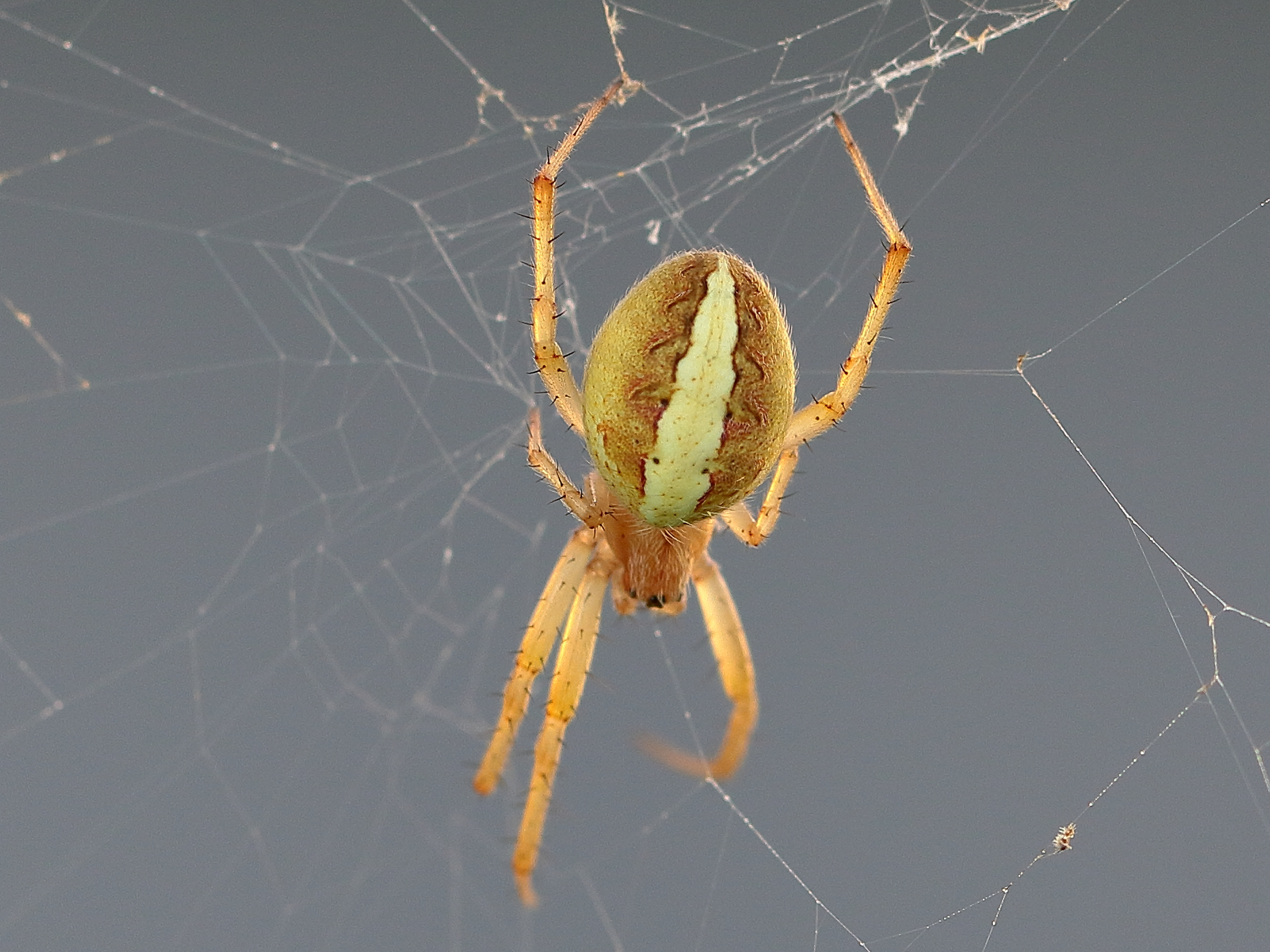
Female dorsal

== Description ==
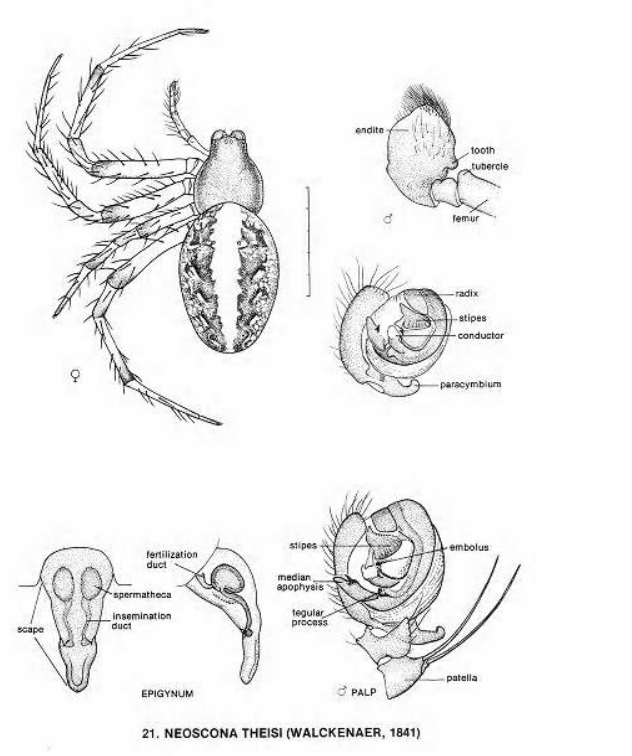
Illustration of Neoscona theisi, Walckenaer, 1841

Neoscona theisi females have a body length up to 11 mm (0.43 in). Males are slightly smaller, measuring up to 9 mm (0.35 in). They build an orb web and rest near the centre. Individuals vary in color from dark reddish-brown to pale-yellow with a distinct pattern on the upper abdomen, lighter along the centre-line and darker on the sides. The legs are light with dark patches at the joints. The sternum is a dark shield shape with a pale yellow longitudinal stripe mid-line. The sternum contrasts with the pale coxa of the nearest leg joints.

There is a characteristic longitudinal groove on the carapace which separates all species of Neoscona from species of Araneus.

== Subspecies ==
- Neoscona theisi theisiella
