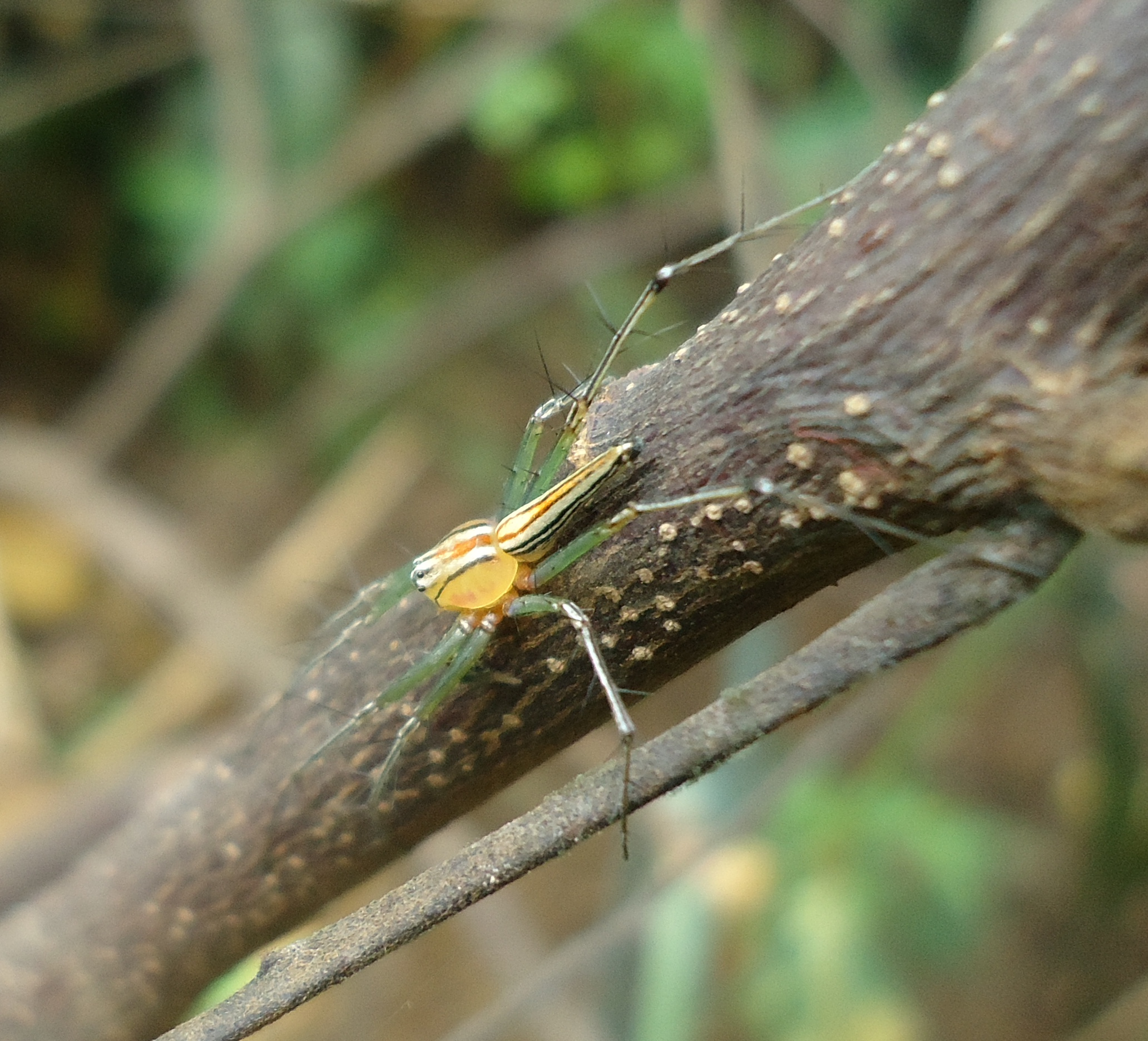
- Female O. macilentus from the Philippines
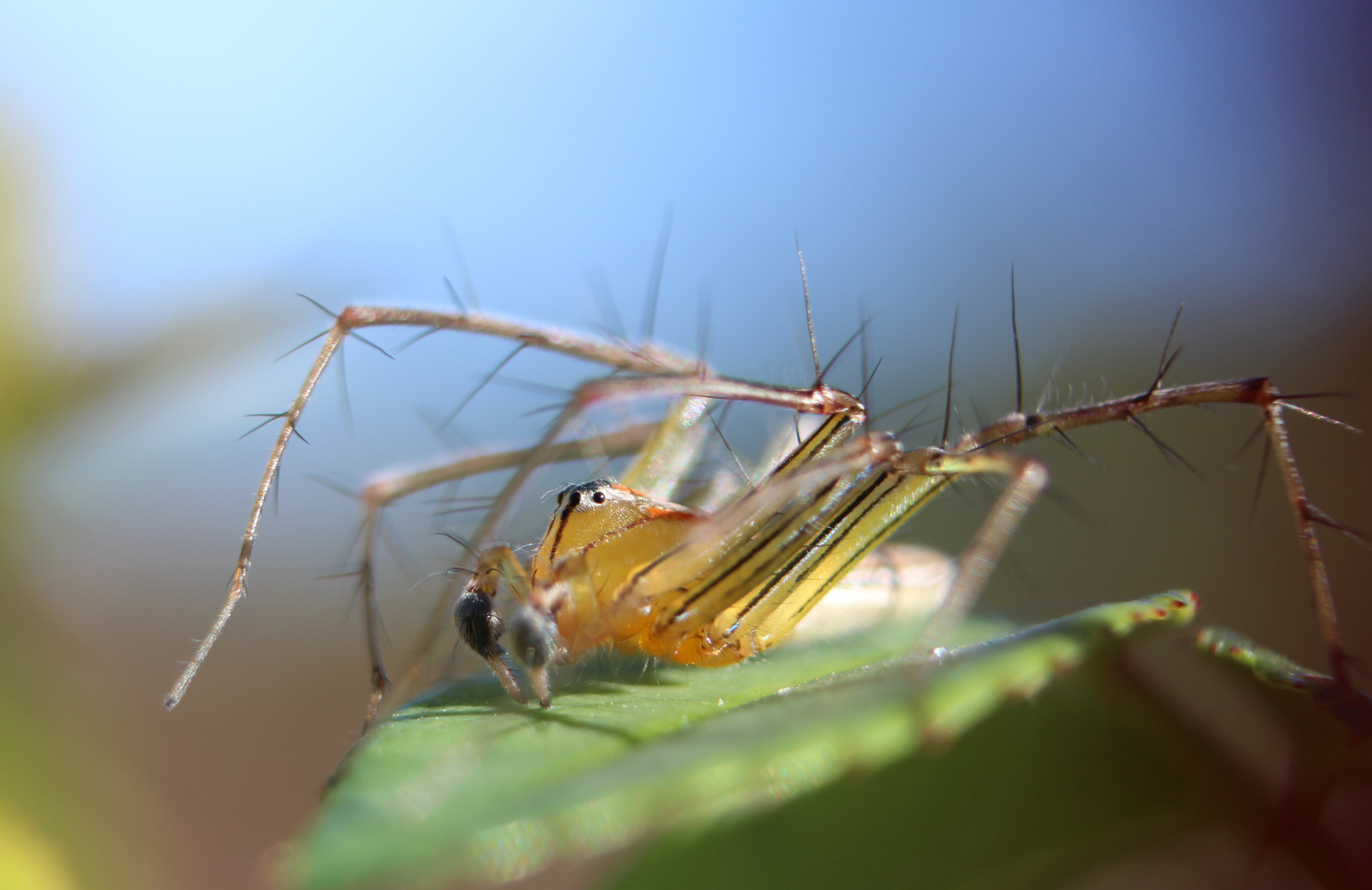
- Male O. macilentus from Brisbane, Australia

Scientific classification
- Kingdom: Animalia
- Phylum: Arthropoda
- Subphylum: Chelicerata
- Class: Arachnida
- Order: Araneae
- Infraorder: Araneomorphae
- Family: Oxyopidae
- Genus: Oxyopes
- Species: O. macilentus

Binomial name
- Oxyopes macilentus L. Koch, 1878

= Oxyopes macilentus =

Species of spider

Oxyopes macilentus, sometimes known as the lean lynx spider, is a species of lynx spiders from East Asia, South Asia, Southeast Asia, and northern Australia. They are active predators, hunting invertebrates (including other spiders) among vegetation. They are especially common in grassy areas and rice fields. Their bodies are characteristically long and thin, about four times as long as it is wide. Their body color ranges from pale white to yellow, orange, or green; with a pattern of black, orange, and white longitudinal lines. Females have a maximum body length of 10 mm (0.39 in), while males grow to 9 mm (0.35 in).

The species was first described in 1878 by the German arachnologist Ludwig Carl Christian Koch. The specific name is from Latin macilentus ("lean" or "thin"), in reference to the spider's body. It is classified under the genus Oxyopes.
