= Oxyopes juvencus =

Scientific classification
- Kingdom: Animalia
- Phylum: Arthropoda
- Subphylum: Chelicerata
- Class: Arachnida
- Order: Araneae
- Infraorder: Araneomorphae
- Family: Oxyopidae
- Genus: Oxyopes
- Species: O. juvencus

Binomial name
- Oxyopes juvencus Strand, 1907

Species of spider

Oxyopes juvencus is a species of spider of the genus Oxyopes. It is endemic to Sri Lanka.
