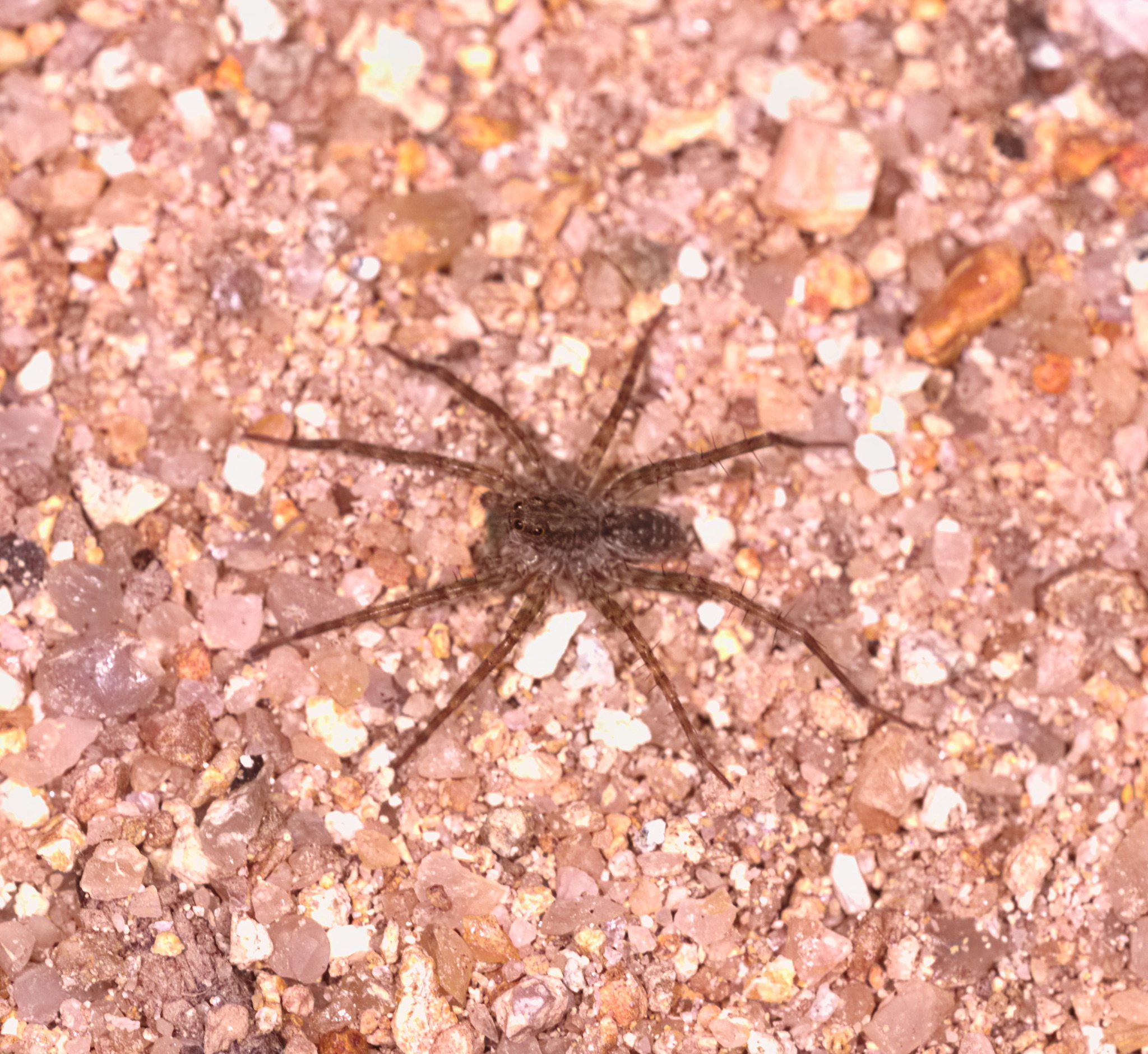
- P. sumatrana from Hong Kong

Scientific classification
- Kingdom: Animalia
- Phylum: Arthropoda
- Subphylum: Chelicerata
- Class: Arachnida
- Order: Araneae
- Infraorder: Araneomorphae
- Family: Lycosidae
- Genus: Pardosa
- Species: P. sumatrana

Binomial name
- Pardosa sumatrana (Thorell, 1890)

Synonyms
- Lycosa sumatrana Thorell, 1890; Lycosa chengta Fox, 1935; Lycosa arorai Dyal, 1935; Pardosa davidi Schenkel, 1963; Lycosa mysorensis Tikader & Mukerji, 1971; Pardosa tieshinglii Barrion et al., 2013; Pardosa villarealae Barrion et al., 2013

= Pardosa sumatrana =

Species of wolf spider

Pardosa sumatrana is a species of wolf spider in the family Lycosidae. It was first described by Tamerlan Thorell in 1890 from specimens collected in Sumatra.

== Taxonomy ==
The species was originally described as Lycosa sumatrana by Thorell in 1890. It was transferred to the genus Pardosa by Hogg in 1919.

Several species have been synonymized with P. sumatrana over the years. Chen & Gao (1990) synonymized Arctosa chengta and Pardosa davidi with P. sumatrana. Barrion & Litsinger (1995) synonymized Chorilycosa arorai. More recently, Abhijith et al. (2021) synonymized Pardosa mysorensis, and Wang et al. (2021) synonymized both Pardosa tieshinglii and P. villarealae.

== Distribution ==
P. sumatrana has a wide distribution across South and Southeast Asia. It has been recorded from India, Sri Lanka, Nepal, Bhutan, Bangladesh, Myanmar, Thailand, China, the Philippines, and Indonesia (specifically Sulawesi).

== Habitat ==
The species is commonly found in agricultural habitats, particularly rice fields, where it serves as a predator of agricultural pests. It has also been found in forest floor litter and various ground-dwelling habitats.

== Description ==
According to Thorell's original description, P. sumatrana has a dark cephalothorax marked with three longitudinal pale bands covered in grayish-white pubescence. The central band is the widest and uniform, while the lateral bands are narrow and irregular. The sternum is black, often with a longitudinal testaceous line at the front.

The legs are olive-testaceous with dark annulations. The dorsal abdomen is covered with dense grayish pubescence and shows a pale or yellowish thick chevron mark at the front, followed by a thin black V-shaped mark, and usually pale spots arranged in four or two longitudinal series behind it.

In females, the vulva consists of two very shiny black tubercles with a narrow septum between them and a narrow procurved ridge behind them forming a pale ∩-shaped structure. Adult males measure approximately 5.75 mm in length, while females reach 6.5–8 mm.
