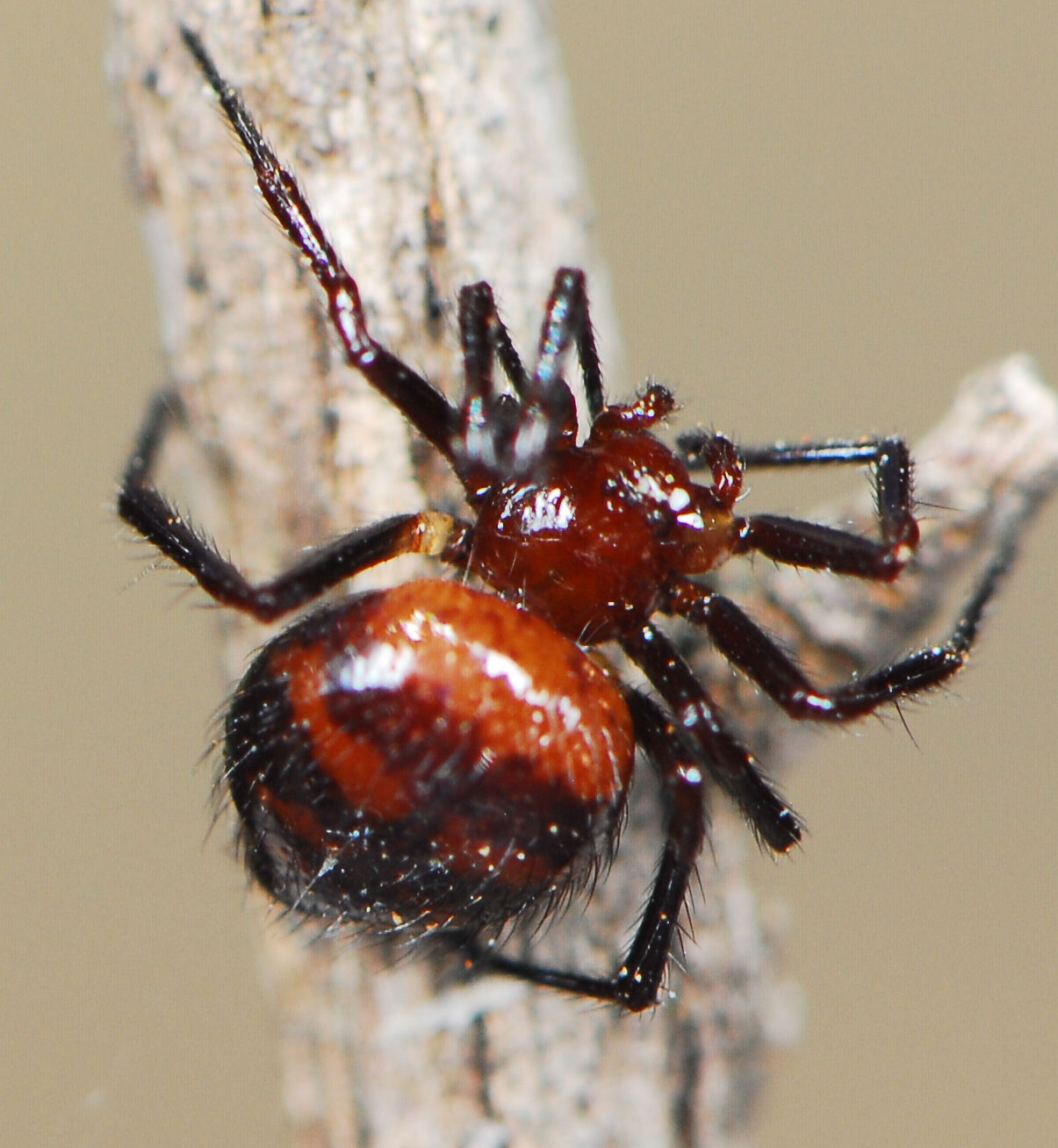
- Female
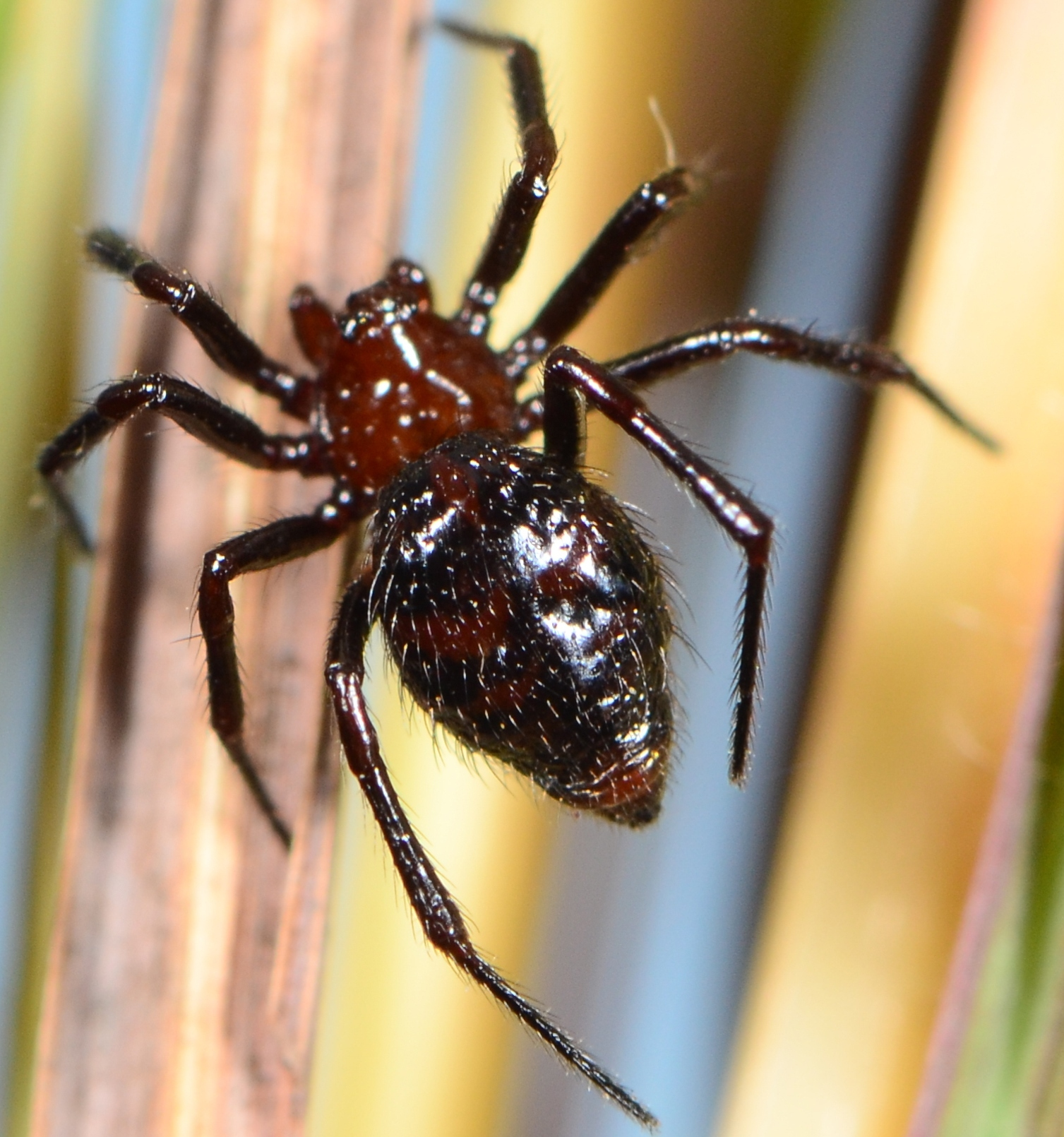

Scientific classification
- Kingdom: Animalia
- Phylum: Arthropoda
- Subphylum: Chelicerata
- Class: Arachnida
- Order: Araneae
- Infraorder: Araneomorphae
- Family: Theridiidae
- Genus: Euryopis
- Species: E. episinoides

Binomial name
- Euryopis episinoides (Walckenaer, 1847)

Synonyms
- Theridion acuminatum Lucas, 1846; Argus episinoides Walckenaer, 1847; Theridion scriptum O. Pickard-Cambridge, 1872; Euryopis tarsalis Pavesi, 1875; Theridium acuminatum Canestrini, 1876; Euryopis quadrimaculata O. Pickard-Cambridge, 1876; Euryopis acuminata Simon, 1881; Euryopis scripta Simon, 1881

= Euryopis episinoides =

Black Ant Eating Comb-Foot Spider

Species of spider

Euryopis episinoides is a species of spider in the family Theridiidae. It is native to the Mediterranean region and has been introduced to South Africa, where it is commonly known as the black ant eating comb-foot spider.

== Distribution ==
Euryopis episinoides is found in Cape Verde, the Mediterranean region to Turkey, Georgia, and Israel. It has been introduced to South Africa, Réunion, India, and China.

In South Africa, the species is known from the provinces Eastern Cape, Free State, Gauteng, KwaZulu-Natal, Limpopo, Mpumalanga, Northern Cape, and Western Cape. Notable locations include Addo Elephant National Park, Table Mountain National Park, and Kruger National Park.

== Habitat and ecology ==
Euryopis episinoides inhabits a large range at altitudes from 37 to 1909 m above sea level. Ground-dwelling spiders associated with ants, they are sampled in high numbers from crops including cotton, minneola, maize, vineyards, and pear orchards. This species is common in the Mediterranean region.

== Description ==
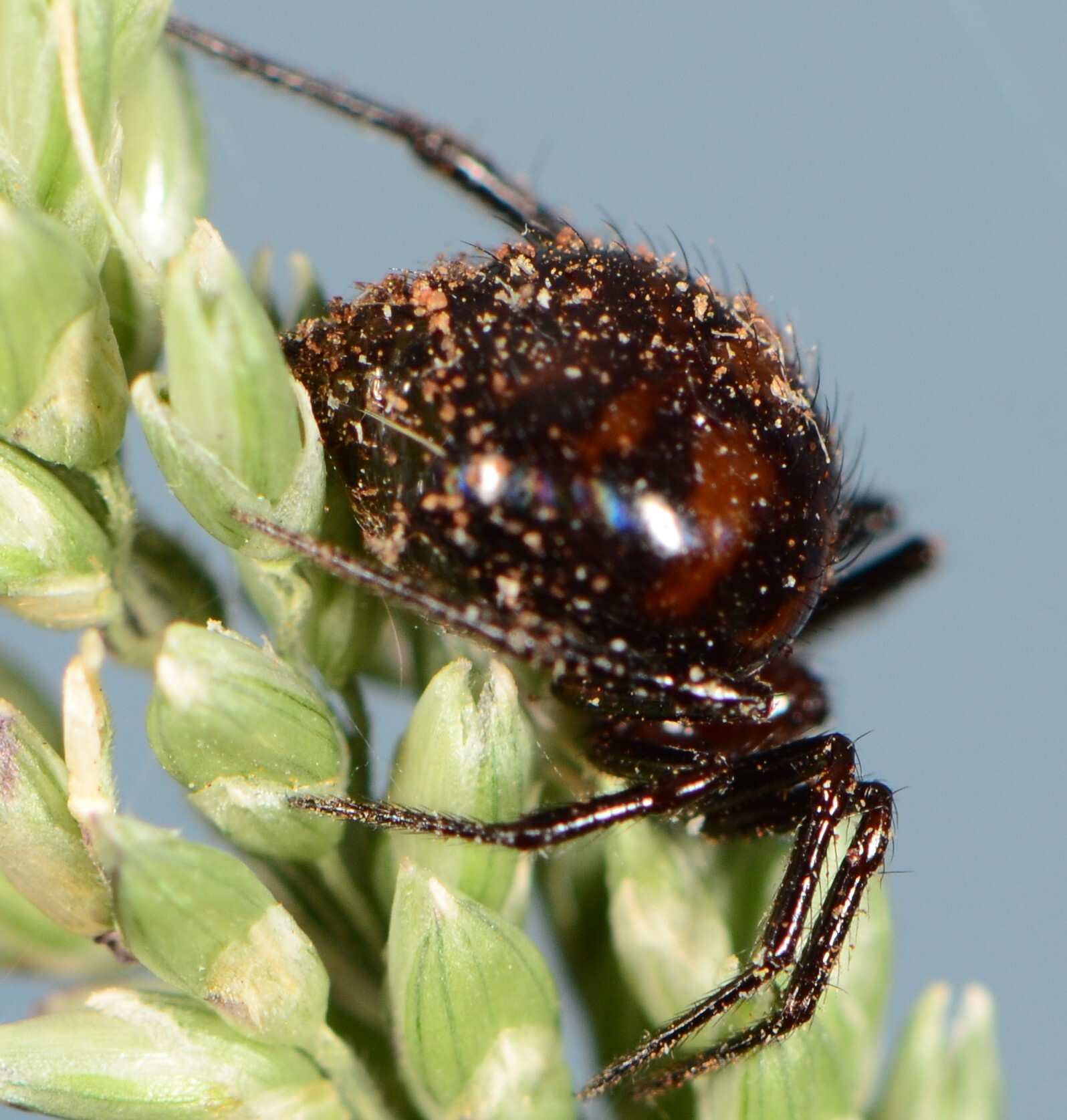

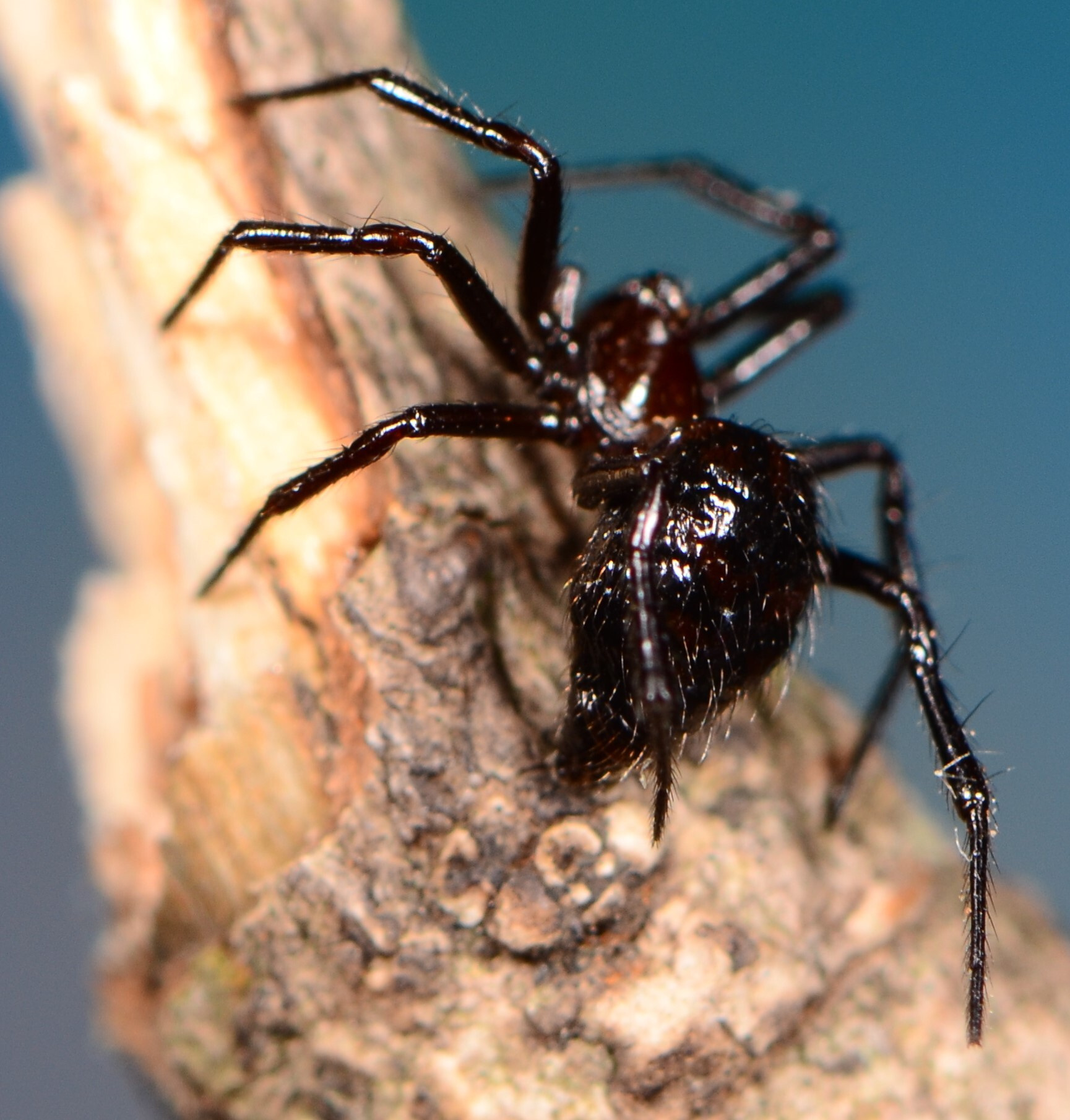

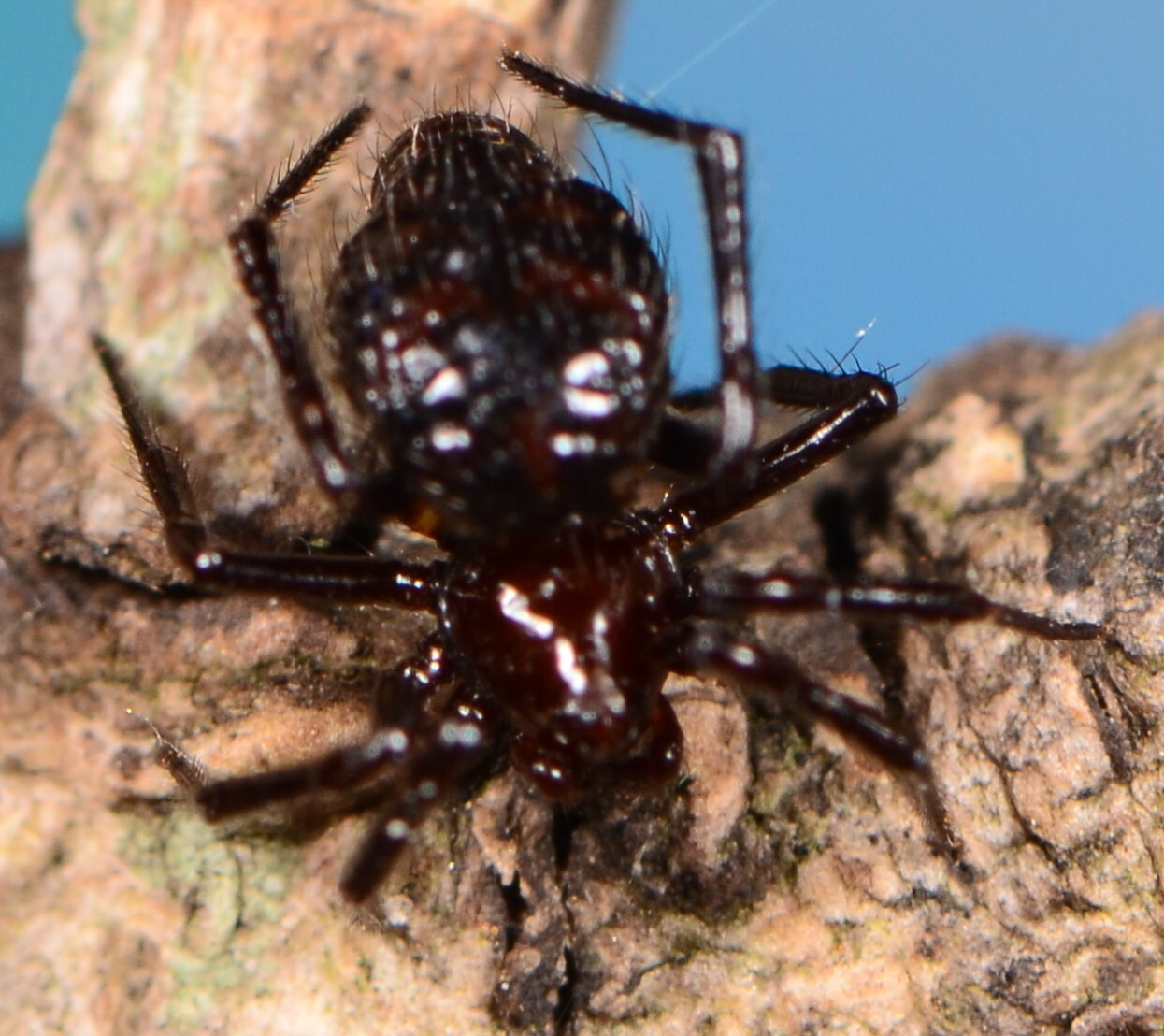

== Conservation ==
Euryopis episinoides is listed as Least Concern by the South African National Biodiversity Institute due to its wide geographical range. The species has been sampled from more than ten protected areas in South Africa.
