= Ocyale pilosa =

Scientific classification
- Kingdom: Animalia
- Phylum: Arthropoda
- Subphylum: Chelicerata
- Class: Arachnida
- Order: Araneae
- Infraorder: Araneomorphae
- Family: Lycosidae
- Genus: Ocyale
- Species: O. pilosa

Binomial name
- Ocyale pilosa (Roewer, 1960)

Species of spider

Ocyale pilosa, is a species of spider of the genus Ocyale. It is a cosmopolitan species found from areas located between West Africa to Myanmar.
