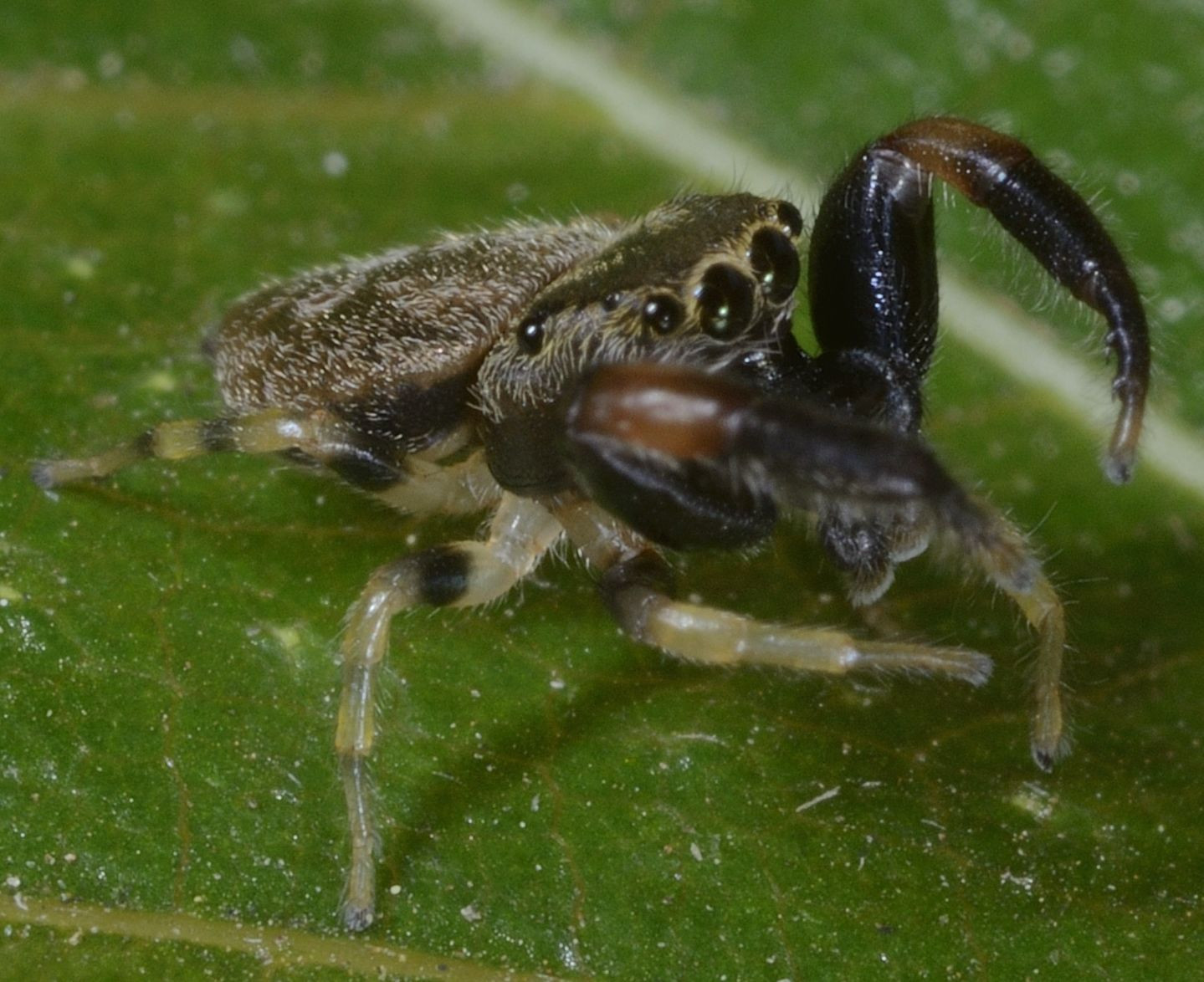
- Female
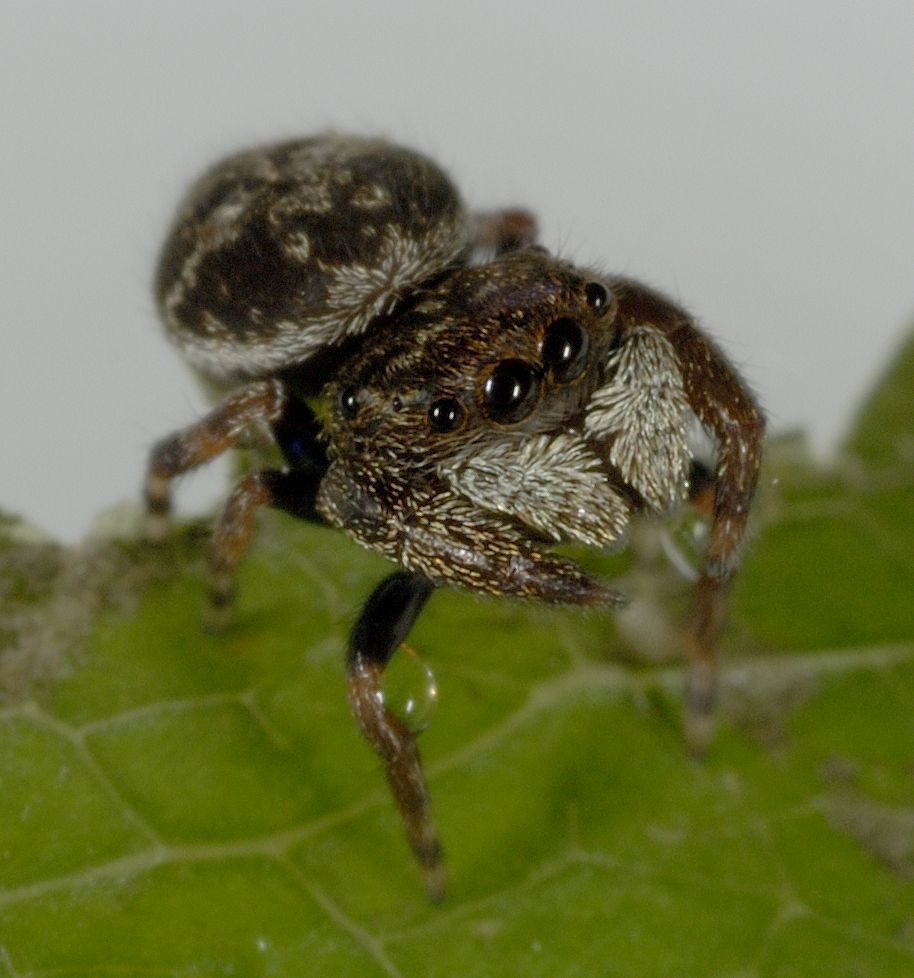
- Male

Scientific classification
- Kingdom: Animalia
- Phylum: Arthropoda
- Subphylum: Chelicerata
- Class: Arachnida
- Order: Araneae
- Infraorder: Araneomorphae
- Family: Salticidae
- Genus: Ballus
- Species: B. segmentatus

Binomial name
- Ballus segmentatus Simon, 1900

Synonyms
- Ballus sellatus Simon, 1900

= Ballus segmentatus =

Species of spider

Ballus segmentatus is a species of spider of the genus Ballus. It is endemic to Sri Lanka.

== Taxonomy ==
Ballus segmentatus was described by Eugène Simon in 1900 from specimens collected in Sri Lanka. In the same publication, Simon also described Ballus sellatus from Sri Lanka, based on a female specimen while B. segmentatus was described from males.

A molecular and morphological study published in 2022 by Bopearachchi, Eberle, and Benjamin suggested that the two species are conspecific. Their analysis of specimens from multiple localities across Sri Lanka revealed that although there is some variation in color pattern, markings, and size, this variation does not support the recognition of two distinct species. Consequently, B. sellatus is now considered a junior synonym of B. segmentatus.

== Distribution and habitat ==
B. segmentatus has been recorded from the Central and Uva Provinces of Sri Lanka.

The species inhabits sub-montane wet evergreen cloud forests and high-elevation montane cloud forests, occurring at elevations ranging from approximately 1,600 to 2,100 meters above sea level. Specimens have been collected by beating foliage up to a height of two meters, with one specimen also found in leaf litter.

== Description ==
Ballus segmentatus is a small spider with a total body length of approximately 3.4-3.6 mm.

Females have a rounded cephalothorax that is dark brown in color. The opisthosoma is also rounded and displays reticulate (net-like) markings. The cephalothorax measures approximately 1.1 mm in length and 1.2 mm in width, while the opisthosoma is about 1.9 mm long and 1.6 mm wide. The eyes are surrounded by dark rings. The legs are light yellow and lack dark markings laterally.

Males are similar in overall appearance to females but slightly larger, with a total length of about 3.6 mm. The cephalothorax measures approximately 1.4 mm in length and 1.3 mm in width, while the opisthosoma is about 1.5 mm long and 1.4 mm wide. Males can be distinguished by the presence of a pseudo-conductor, reticulate markings on the opisthosoma, and a tapering retrolateral tibial apophysis on the pedipalp.

== Conservation ==
Ballus segmentatus is known from relatively few individuals and is restricted to mid and high-altitude cloud forests (900-1800m) in the Central and Uva Provinces of Sri Lanka. Most known localities are within protected areas. A conservation status assessment using IUCN criteria suggests a status of Vulnerable (VU B1), based on an estimated geographic range of less than 20,000 km², fragmented habitat, and no more than 10 known locations.
