= Evarcha cancellata =

Scientific classification
- Kingdom: Animalia
- Phylum: Arthropoda
- Subphylum: Chelicerata
- Class: Arachnida
- Order: Araneae
- Infraorder: Araneomorphae
- Family: Salticidae
- Genus: Evarcha
- Species: E. cancellata

Binomial name
- Evarcha cancellata (Simon, 1902)

Synonyms
- Colopsus cancellatus Simon, 1902

Species of spider

Evarcha cancellata is a species of spider of the genus Evarcha. It is native to Sri Lanka and Java.
