= Pagida salticiformis =

Scientific classification
- Kingdom: Animalia
- Phylum: Arthropoda
- Subphylum: Chelicerata
- Class: Arachnida
- Order: Araneae
- Infraorder: Araneomorphae
- Family: Thomisidae
- Genus: Pagida
- Species: P. salticiformis

Binomial name
- Pagida salticiformis (O. Pickard-Cambridge, 1883)

Synonyms
- Palaephatus salticiformis O. Pickard-Cambridge, 1883

Species of spider

Pagida salticiformis, is a species of spider of the genus Pagida. It is endemic to Sri Lanka.
