= Phyaces =

Scientific classification
- Kingdom: Animalia
- Phylum: Arthropoda
- Subphylum: Chelicerata
- Class: Arachnida
- Order: Araneae
- Infraorder: Araneomorphae
- Family: Salticidae
- Genus: Phyaces; Simon, 1902
- Species: P. comosus

Binomial name
- Phyaces comosus Simon, 1902

Genus of spiders

Phyaces is a monotypic genus of Sri Lankan jumping spiders containing the single species, Phyaces comosus. It was first described by Eugène Louis Simon in 1902, and is only found in Sri Lanka.
