= Argyrodes nasutus =

Scientific classification
- Kingdom: Animalia
- Phylum: Arthropoda
- Subphylum: Chelicerata
- Class: Arachnida
- Order: Araneae
- Infraorder: Araneomorphae
- Family: Theridiidae
- Genus: Argyrodes
- Species: A. nasutus

Binomial name
- Argyrodes nasutus O. Pickard-Cambridge, 1880

Species of spider

Argyrodes nasutus, is a species of spider of the genus Argyrodes. It is endemic to Sri Lanka.
