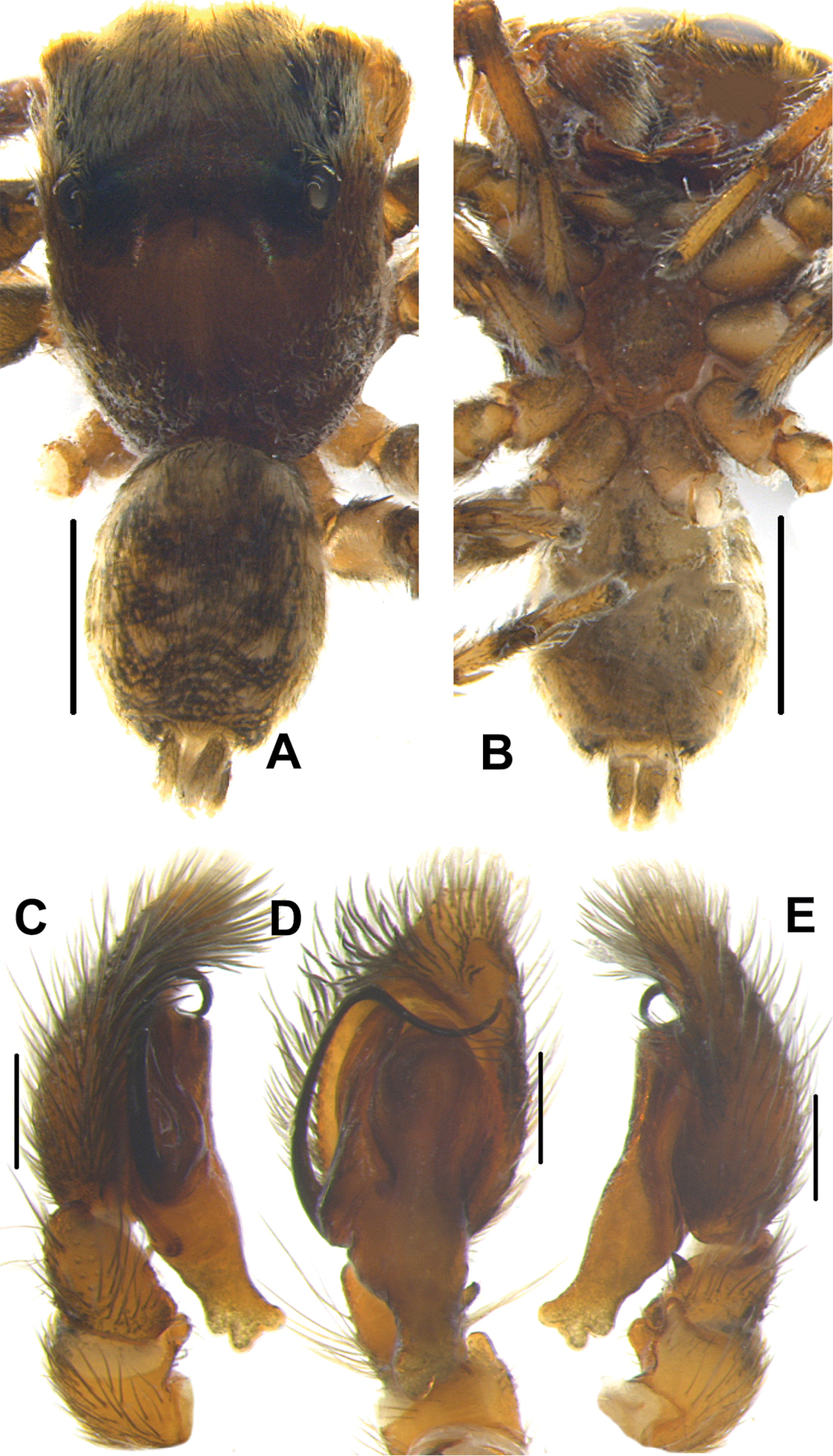
- Different sections of a specimen

Scientific classification
- Kingdom: Animalia
- Phylum: Arthropoda
- Subphylum: Chelicerata
- Class: Arachnida
- Order: Araneae
- Infraorder: Araneomorphae
- Family: Salticidae
- Genus: Tamigalesus
- Species: T. munnaricus

Binomial name
- Tamigalesus munnaricus Zabka, 1988

= Tamigalesus munnaricus =

Species of spider

Tamigalesus munnaricus is a species of spider in the family Salticidae. It is found in India and Sri Lanka.
