= Epidelaxia albostellata =

Scientific classification
- Kingdom: Animalia
- Phylum: Arthropoda
- Subphylum: Chelicerata
- Class: Arachnida
- Order: Araneae
- Infraorder: Araneomorphae
- Family: Salticidae
- Genus: Epidelaxia
- Species: E. albostellata

Binomial name
- Epidelaxia albostellata Simon, 1902

Species of spider

Epidelaxia albostellata, is a species of spider of the genus Epidelaxia. It is endemic to Sri Lanka.
