= Theridion ceylonicus =

Scientific classification
- Kingdom: Animalia
- Phylum: Arthropoda
- Subphylum: Chelicerata
- Class: Arachnida
- Order: Araneae
- Infraorder: Araneomorphae
- Family: Theridiidae
- Genus: Theridion
- Species: T. ceylonicus

Binomial name
- Theridion ceylonicus Dunlop & Jekel, 2009

Species of spider

Theridion ceylonicus, is a species of spider of the genus Theridion. It is endemic to Sri Lanka.

== Homonym ==
- Theridion annulipes O. Pickard-Cambridge, 1869
