= Labullinyphia =

Scientific classification
- Kingdom: Animalia
- Phylum: Arthropoda
- Subphylum: Chelicerata
- Class: Arachnida
- Order: Araneae
- Infraorder: Araneomorphae
- Family: Linyphiidae
- Genus: Labullinyphia van Helsdingen, 1985

Species
- L. furcata Irfan & Peng, 2019 – China; L. tersa (Simon, 1894) – Sri Lanka

Genus of spiders

Labullinyphia is a genus of Asian dwarf spiders containing the species Labullinyphia furcata and Labullinyphia tersa. It was first described by P. J. van Helsdingen in 1985,. The former species is found in China and the latter species in Sri Lanka.
