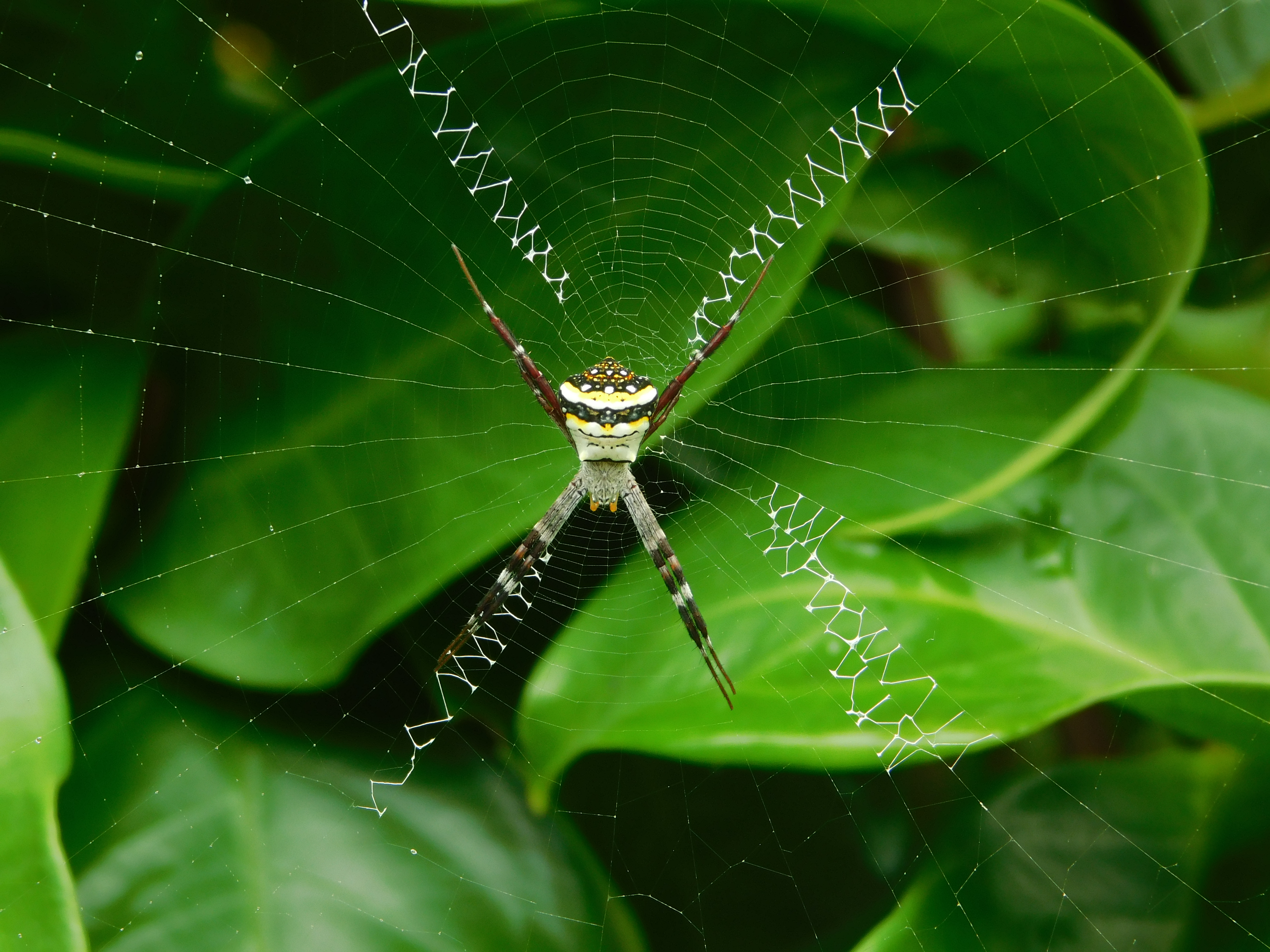
- In Chennai, India

Scientific classification
- Kingdom: Animalia
- Phylum: Arthropoda
- Subphylum: Chelicerata
- Class: Arachnida
- Order: Araneae
- Infraorder: Araneomorphae
- Family: Araneidae
- Genus: Argiope
- Species: A. anasuja

Binomial name
- Argiope anasuja Thorell, 1887

Synonyms
- Argiope plagiata Karsch, 1892

= Argiope anasuja =

Species of spider

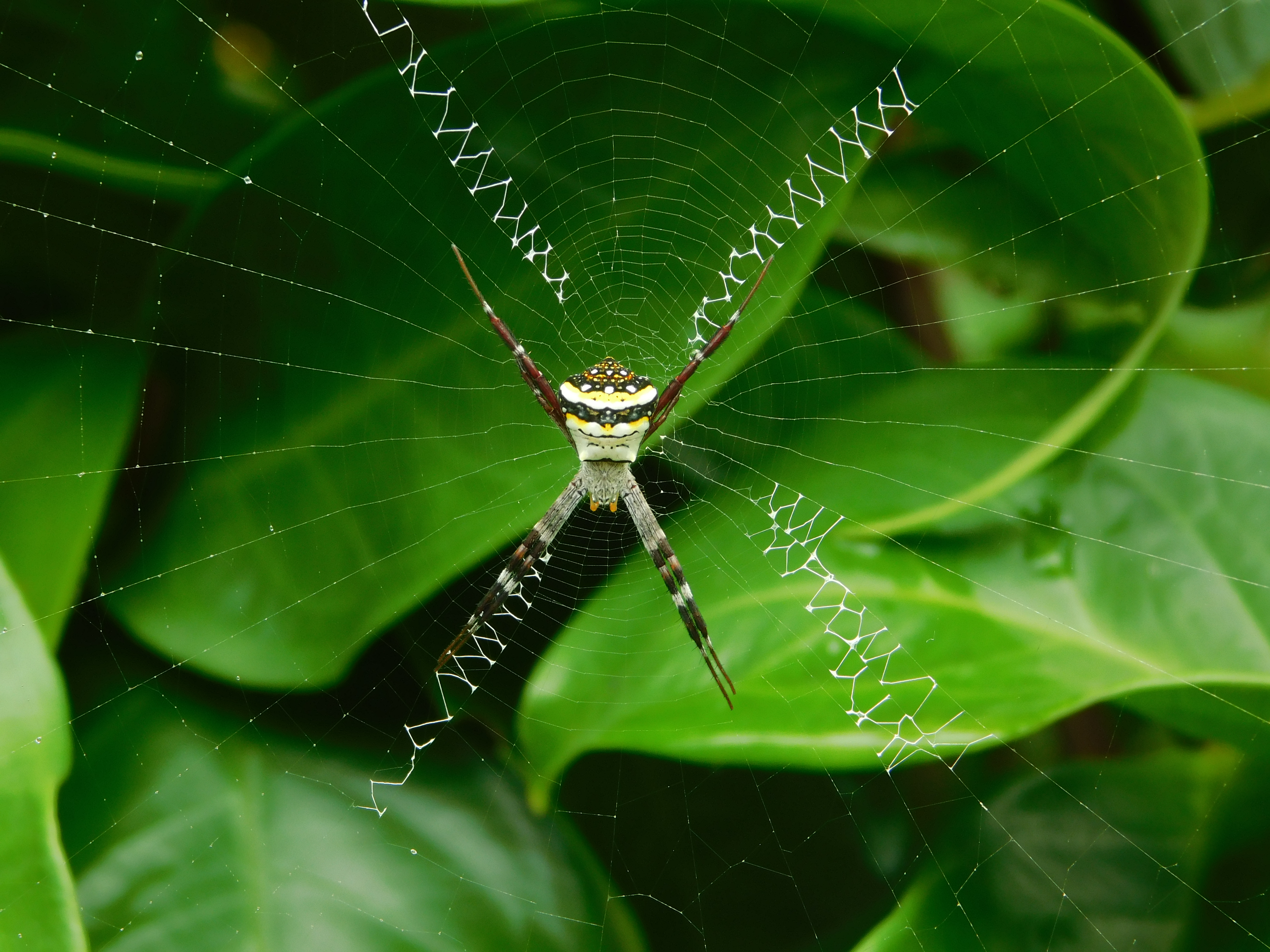
Argiope anasuja Female Spider in Kerala, India

Argiope anasuja, is a species of harmless orb-weaver spider (family Araneidae) found from the Seychelles to India, Pakistan, Nepal, Sri Lanka, Maldives and in Brazil.

== Description ==
Female is about 8–12 mm long and male is 3.5-4.5 mm. After Cephalothorax greyish brown with hairs. Sternum heart shaped with hairy pubescent white patch. Palps bear spines. Legs greyish brown and hairy. Femora dorsally yellowish. Abdomen pentagonal and hairy. Dorsum yellowish with brown transverse bands. Three sigilla pairs distinct. Ventrum dark brownish with two longitudinal white patches.

== Ecology ==
Like other species of the same genus, it is known as a "signature spider"; it builds a web with a zig-zag stabilimentum somewhat resembling letters. The mature female of A. anasuja always rests at the centre of the orb with her head facing downwards. The orb has an opening at the centre and when disturbed she goes through the hole and exits on the other side of the plane of the web.

They are commonly found on flora of Mimosaceae family. They prefer to make the web in a plane of shadow in the daylight.

== Reproduction ==
Males are typically smaller than females. Males spin a web known as a companion web around the female's web. After mating, as in other common spiders, the female kills the male. The female lays eggs on the companion web and wraps them up into a sac. After hatching, the spiderlings cannibalise each other until the strongest spiderling can break the sac wall. The sac can hold from 400 to 1,400 eggs.
