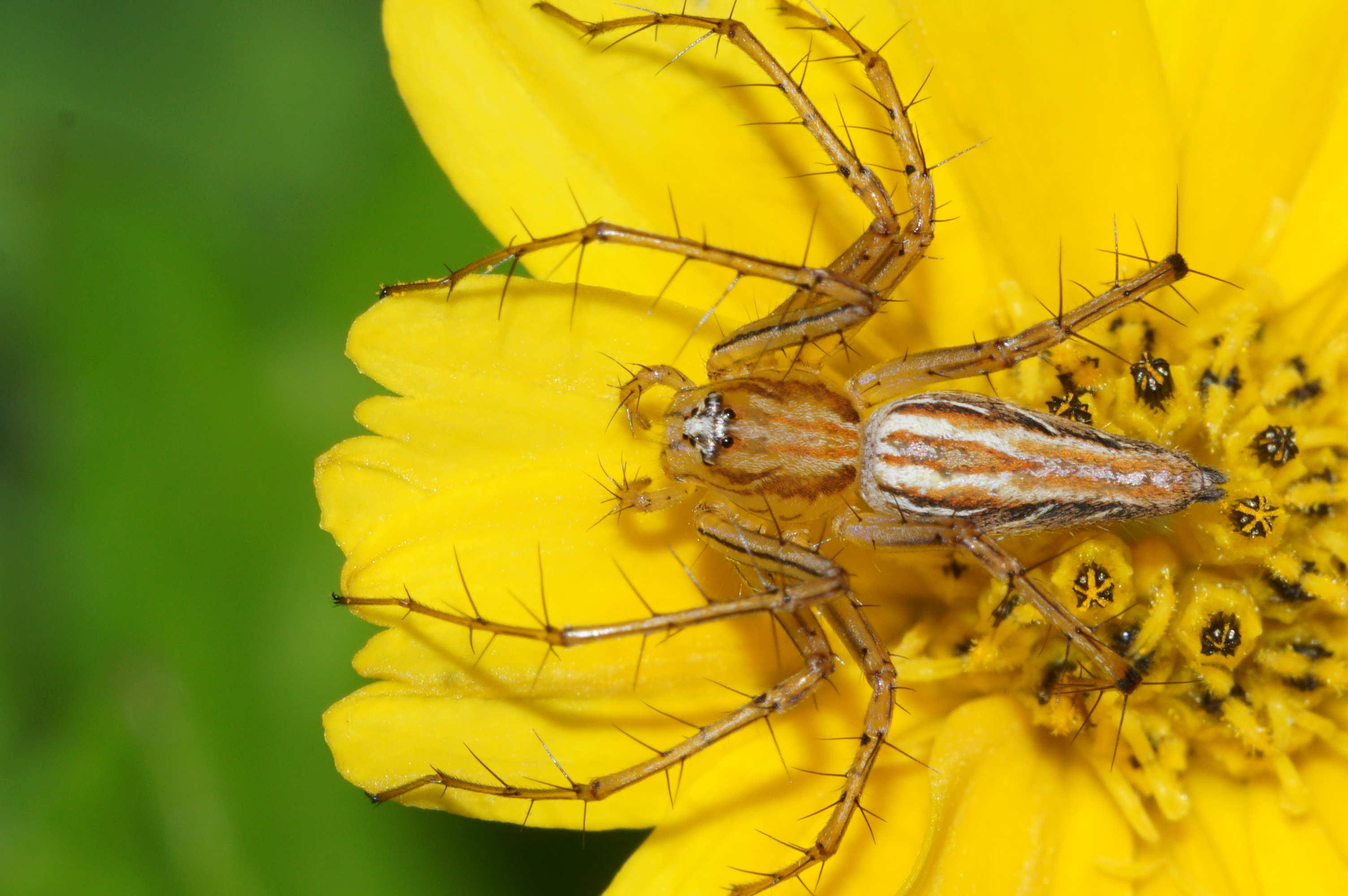
- female from Kerala, India
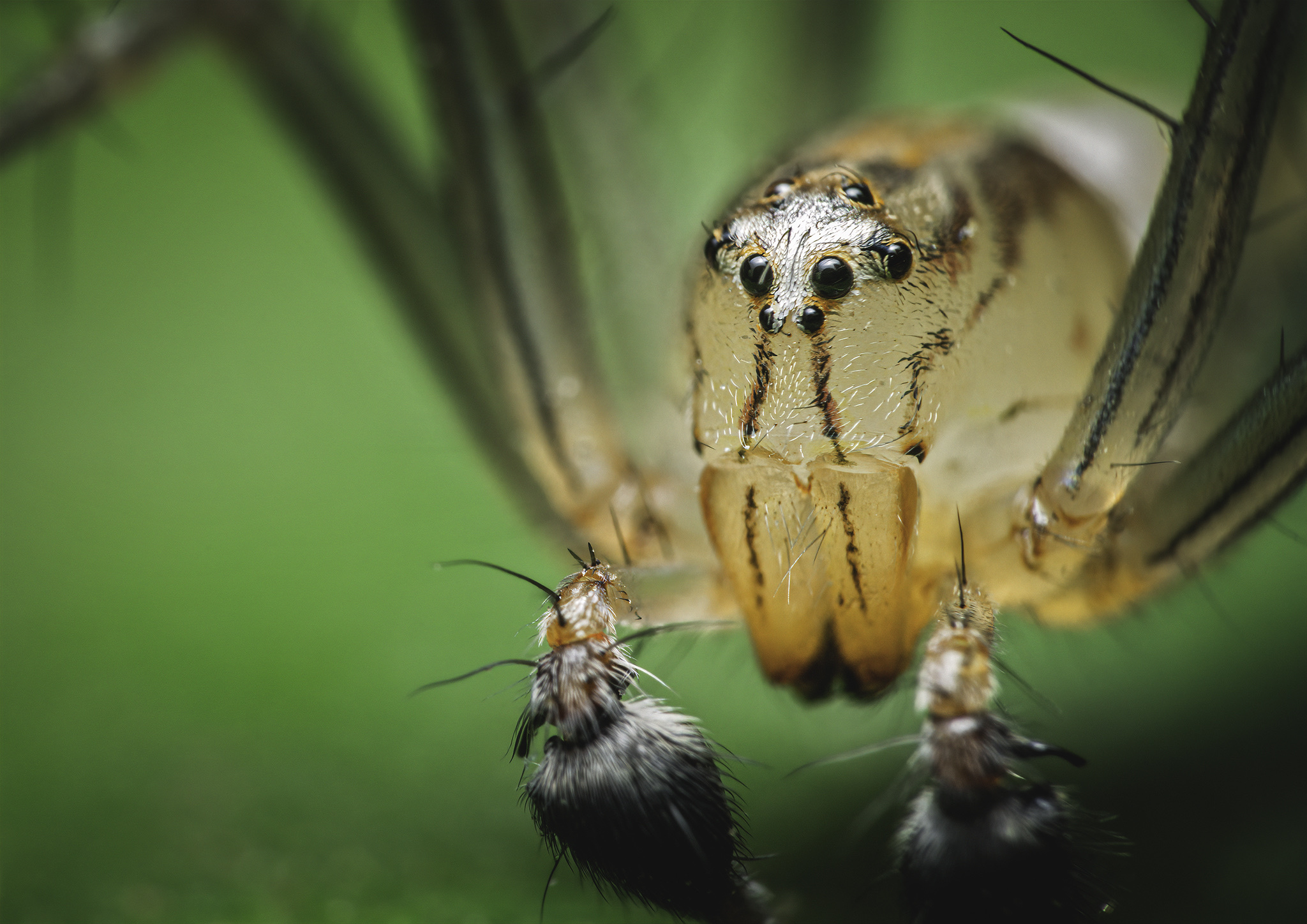
- male from the Philippines

Scientific classification
- Kingdom: Animalia
- Phylum: Arthropoda
- Subphylum: Chelicerata
- Class: Arachnida
- Order: Araneae
- Infraorder: Araneomorphae
- Family: Oxyopidae
- Genus: Oxyopes
- Species: O. javanus

Binomial name
- Oxyopes javanus Thorell, 1887

Synonyms
- Oxyopes lineatipes Simon, 1886; Oxyopes javanus nicobaricus Strand, 1907; Oxyopes hotingchiehi Hu, 1980

= Oxyopes javanus =

Species of lynx spider

Oxyopes javanus is a species of lynx spider in the family Oxyopidae. It was first described by Tamerlan Thorell in 1887 and is widely distributed across South and Southeast Asia.

== Distribution ==
O. javanus has a broad distribution across Asia, having been recorded from India, Nepal, Bangladesh, Thailand, Indonesia (Java), the Philippines, and China. The species is commonly found in agricultural environments, particularly in rice fields and corn plantations where it serves as an important predator of pest insects.

== Habitat and ecology ==
Oxyopes javanus is primarily found in agricultural ecosystems, where it plays a significant role as a biological control agent. The species is particularly abundant in corn and rice fields, where it serves as the numerically dominant predator of economically important pest species. As a diurnal hunter, it actively runs over the vegetational canopy of crop plants and demonstrates remarkable agility by leaping from stem to stem with precision.

The species has been identified as an effective predator of corn borer larvae and other lepidopteran pests, making it valuable for natural pest control in agricultural systems.

== Description ==
O. javanus shows clear sexual dimorphism, with females being distinguishable from males in both size and morphological features.

=== Female ===
The female has a high, yellow-orange cephalothorax marked with four black longitudinal bands, with the two lateral bands extending to the lateral edges. The cervical groove and radial furrow are weakly developed, while the thoracic groove is deep and vertical. The species has eight dark, circular eyes arranged in a compact hexagonal pattern. The anterior median eyes are the smallest and positioned close together, while the anterior lateral eyes are the largest.

A distinctive black line runs along the center of the cephalothorax from the anterior median eyes down to the cream-yellow chelicerae. The chelicerae bear two promarginal teeth of unequal size and one medium-sized retromarginal tooth.

The abdomen is elongated and tapers posteriorly, brown in color with a white longitudinal band on the upper surface. Three diagonal gray bands are present on each side, and one gray band appears on the ventral portion. The entire abdomen is covered with short white bristles.

The legs are long, slender, and yellowish with gray longitudinal lines on the underside of the first three pairs. They are covered with brown spines and short bristles on both sides and terminate in three tarsal claws with small teeth.

=== Male ===
Males share most characteristics with females but are distinguished by their modified pedipalps, which bear the reproductive structures. The cymbium (the outermost part of the male palp) is 1.50 mm long with a round base and pointed tip, covered in dense brown hairs.

== Reproduction ==
The species has an XX-XO sex-determination system, where females have 24 chromosomes (22 autosomes + XX) and males have 23 chromosomes (22 autosomes + XO). This makes the male heterogametic and the female homogametic for sex determination.

== Taxonomy ==
The species was originally described by Thorell in 1887 from specimens collected in Java, Indonesia. Several names have been placed in synonymy with O. javanus, including Oxyopes lineatipes Simon, 1886, which was later determined to be a misidentification. The subspecies Oxyopes javanus nicobaricus Strand, 1907 was synonymized with the nominate form in 2019.
