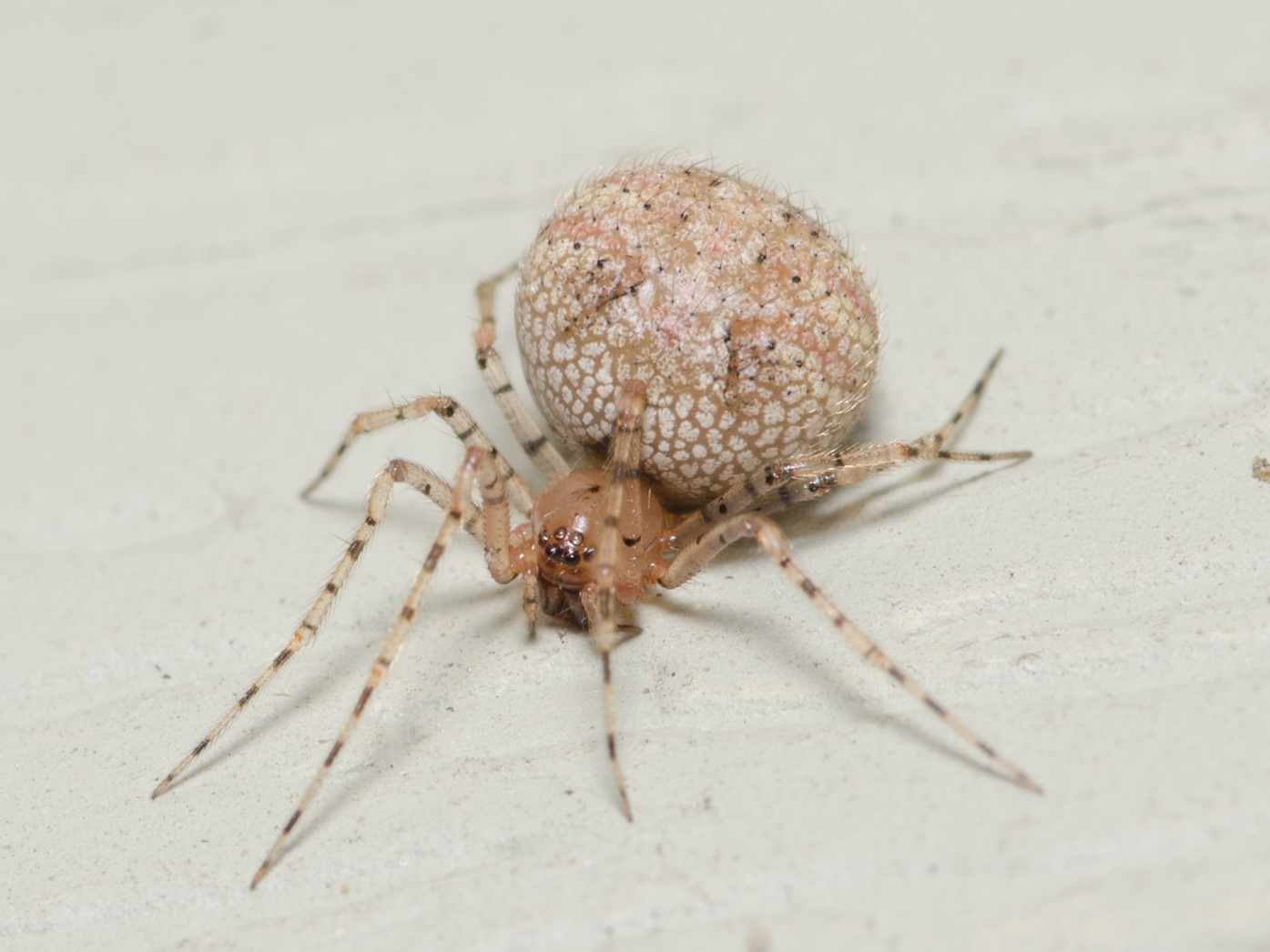
- female

Scientific classification
- Kingdom: Animalia
- Phylum: Arthropoda
- Subphylum: Chelicerata
- Class: Arachnida
- Order: Araneae
- Infraorder: Araneomorphae
- Family: Theridiidae
- Genus: Yunohamella
- Species: Y. mneon

Binomial name
- Yunohamella mneon (Bösenberg & Strand, 1906)

Synonyms
- Theridion mneon Bösenberg & Strand, 1906; Keijia mneon Yoshida, 2001; Coleosoma adamsoni Koçak & Kemal, 2008; Platnickina mneon Koçak & Kemal, 2008; Yunohamella varietas Lee & Kim, 2021; Platnickina adamsoni Iwanaga & Kawai, 2025; Yunohamella lyrica Iwanaga & Kawai, 2025

= Yuhonamella mneon =

Species of spider

Yunohamella mneon is a species of spider in the family Theridiidae. Described from Korea and Japan, it has been observed from South Africa, with many observations from North America.

== Distribution ==
Yunohamella mneon is known from Korea and Japan.

In South Africa, the species has been recorded from five provinces. Notable locations include Potchefstroom, Lhuvhondo Nature Reserve, Turfloop, and Lowveld National Botanical Garden.

== Habitat and ecology ==
Yunohamella mneon constructs typical cobwebs in different habitats. The species has been sampled from the Savanna and Grassland biomes.

== Description ==
Adults of Yunohamella mneon are small cobweb spiders with a rounded abdomen and distinct dark markings. Females are typically larger than males. As in other Yunohamella species, the genital morphology is the primary diagnostic feature, with the epigynum and palpal organ differing from related taxa such as Y. lyrica and Y. varietas.

== Conservation ==
Yunohamella mneon is listed as Least Concern due to its wide geographical range.

== Taxonomy ==
Yunohamella mneon was originally described by Bösenberg and Strand in 1906 as Theridion mneon based on material from Japan and Korea. The species has been introduced to several countries including Ghana, Seychelles, China, Japan, and the Pacific Islands. It was transferred to Keijia by Yoshida in 2001, then to Platnickina by Koçak and Kemal in 2008, and most recently to Yunohamella in 2025. The species Yunohamella varietas was synonymized with Y. mneon in 2025.
