= Epidelaxia albocruciata =

Scientific classification
- Kingdom: Animalia
- Phylum: Arthropoda
- Subphylum: Chelicerata
- Class: Arachnida
- Order: Araneae
- Infraorder: Araneomorphae
- Family: Salticidae
- Genus: Epidelaxia
- Species: E. albocruciata

Binomial name
- Epidelaxia albocruciata Simon, 1902

Species of spider

Epidelaxia albocruciata, is a species of spider of the genus Epidelaxia. It is endemic to Sri Lanka.
