= Tarrocanus capra =

Scientific classification
- Kingdom: Animalia
- Phylum: Arthropoda
- Subphylum: Chelicerata
- Class: Arachnida
- Order: Araneae
- Infraorder: Araneomorphae
- Family: Thomisidae
- Genus: Tarrocanus
- Species: T. capra

Binomial name
- Tarrocanus capra Simon, 1895

Species of spider

Tarrocanus capra, is a species of spider of the genus Tarrocanus. It is endemic to Sri Lanka.

== See also ==
- List of Thomisidae species
