= Phausina bivittata =

Scientific classification
- Kingdom: Animalia
- Phylum: Arthropoda
- Subphylum: Chelicerata
- Class: Arachnida
- Order: Araneae
- Infraorder: Araneomorphae
- Family: Salticidae
- Genus: Phausina
- Species: P. bivittata

Binomial name
- Phausina bivittata Simon, 1902

Species of spider

Phausina bivittata is a species of spider of the genus Phausina. It is endemic to Sri Lanka.
