= Cephalobares globiceps =

Scientific classification
- Kingdom: Animalia
- Phylum: Arthropoda
- Subphylum: Chelicerata
- Class: Arachnida
- Order: Araneae
- Infraorder: Araneomorphae
- Family: Theridiidae
- Genus: Cephalobares
- Species: C. globiceps

Binomial name
- Cephalobares globiceps O. Pickard-Cambridge, 1870

Species of spider

Cephalobares globiceps, is a species of spider of the genus Cephalobares. It is found in China and Sri Lanka.
