= Obrimona =

Scientific classification
- Kingdom: Animalia
- Phylum: Arthropoda
- Subphylum: Chelicerata
- Class: Arachnida
- Order: Araneae
- Infraorder: Araneomorphae
- Family: Linyphiidae
- Genus: Obrimona; Strand, 1934
- Species: O. tennenti

Binomial name
- Obrimona tennenti (Simon, 1894)

Genus of spiders

Obrimona is a monotypic genus of Asian dwarf spiders containing the single species, Obrimona tennenti. It was first described by Embrik Strand in 1934, and has only been found in Sri Lanka.
