= O. lepidus =

O. lepidus may refer to:

- Olios lepidus, a huntsman spider species
- Opilio lepidus, a harvestman species
- Oxyopes lepidus, a hunting spider species

== See also ==
- Lepidus (disambiguation)
