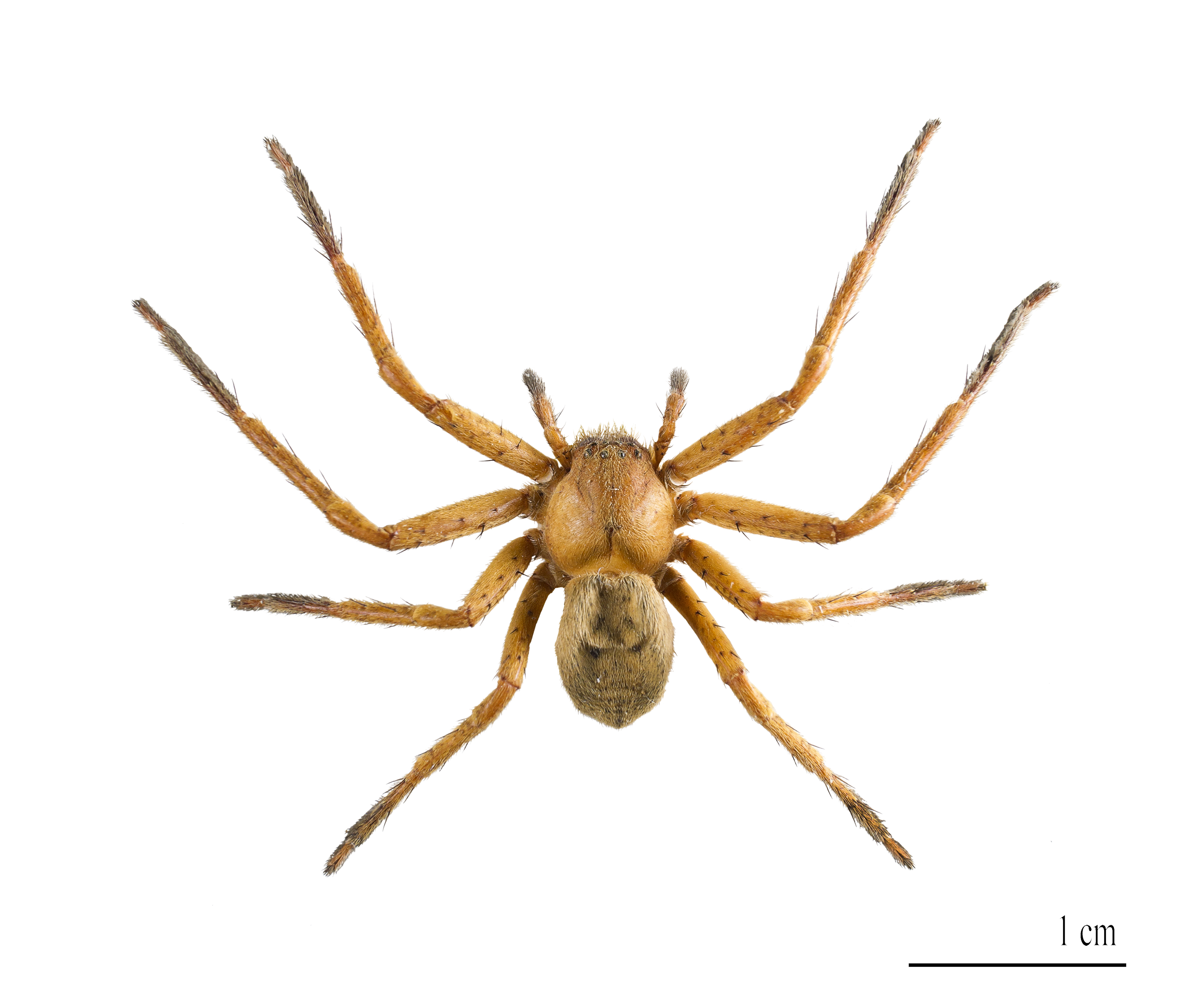
- Male Olios argelasius, Verfeil, Haute-Garonne, France

Scientific classification
- Kingdom: Animalia
- Phylum: Arthropoda
- Subphylum: Chelicerata
- Class: Arachnida
- Order: Araneae
- Infraorder: Araneomorphae
- Family: Sparassidae
- Genus: Olios
- Species: O. argelasius

Binomial name
- Olios argelasius Walckenaer, 1805

Synonyms
- Micrommata spongitarsis; Ocypete algeriana; Ocypete nigritarsis; Ocypete vulpina; Olios algerianus; Olios spongitarsi; Olios spongitarsis; Sparassus argelasius; Sparassus spongitarsis

= Olios argelasius =

Species of spider

Olios argelasius is a species of huntsman spider found in the Mediterranean Basin. It was first described by Charles Athanase Walckenaer in 1805.
