= Olios chubbi =

Chubb's Olios Huntsman Spider

Scientific classification
- Kingdom: Animalia
- Phylum: Arthropoda
- Subphylum: Chelicerata
- Class: Arachnida
- Order: Araneae
- Infraorder: Araneomorphae
- Family: Sparassidae
- Genus: Olios
- Species: O. chubbi

Binomial name
- Olios chubbi Lessert, 1923

Species of spider

Olios chubbi is a species of spider in the family Sparassidae. It occurs in southern Africa and is commonly known as Chubb's Olios huntsman spider.

== Distribution ==
Olios chubbi is found in Mozambique and South Africa. In South Africa, it is recorded from two provinces, KwaZulu-Natal and Limpopo. The species has been collected at altitudes ranging from 47 to 894 m above sea level.

== Habitat and ecology ==
The species consists of nocturnal plant dwellers that wander around in search of prey on the vegetation. Olios chubbi has been sampled from the Indian Ocean Coastal Belt and Savanna biomes, including beating shrubs in dune forest.

== Conservation ==
Olios chubbi is listed as least concern by the South African National Biodiversity Institute. Although the species is presently known only from the male sex, it has a wide geographical range and is therefore listed as Least Concern. The species is protected in Ndumo Game Reserve, uMkhuze Game Reserve, Enseleni Nature Reserve and Blouberg Nature Reserve.

== Taxonomy ==
Olios chubbi was described by Lessert in 1923 with the type locality given only as Zululand. The species is known only from male specimens. According to Jäger (2020), this species is misplaced in Olios and may require generic reassignment in future taxonomic work.
