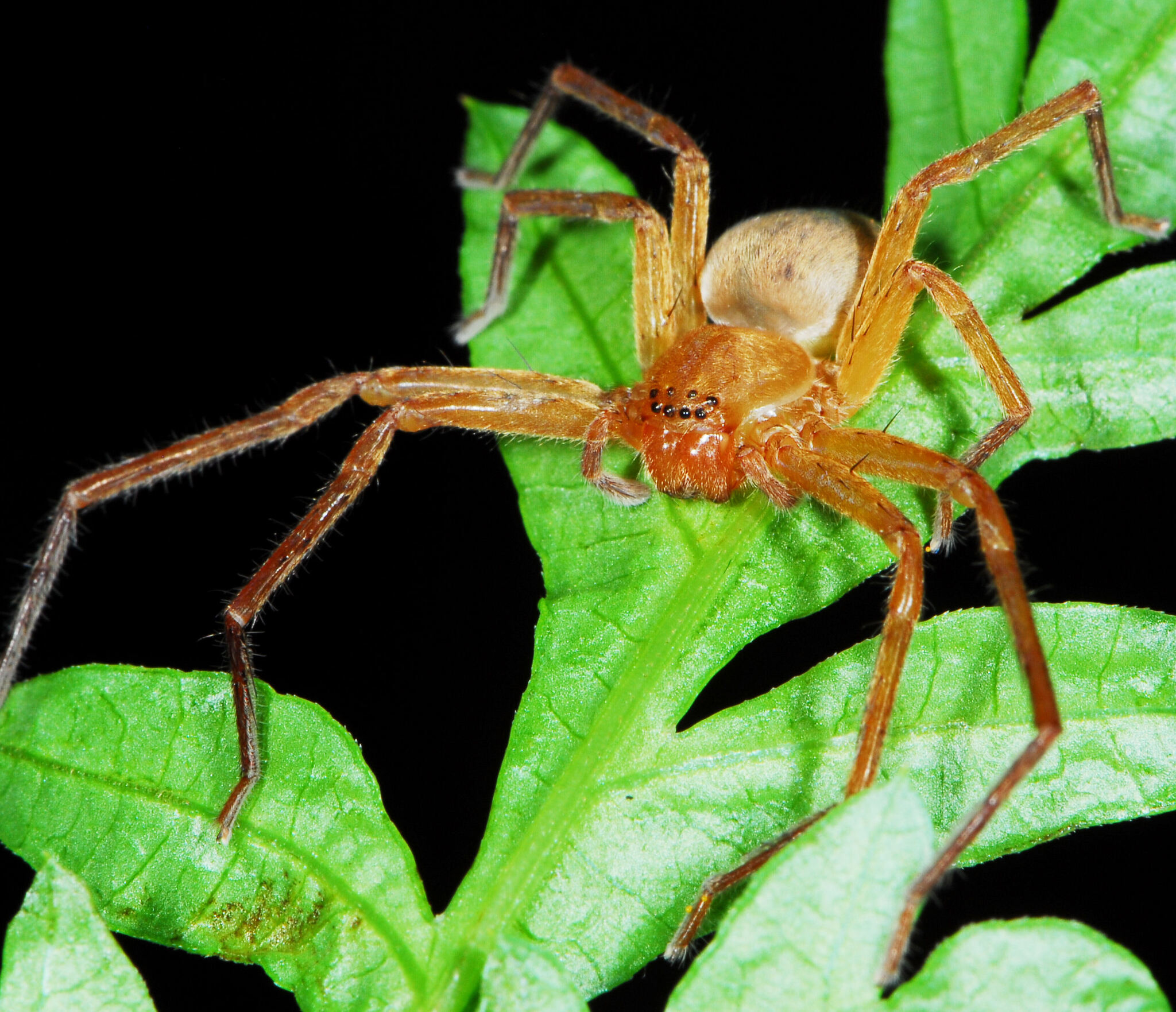
- female
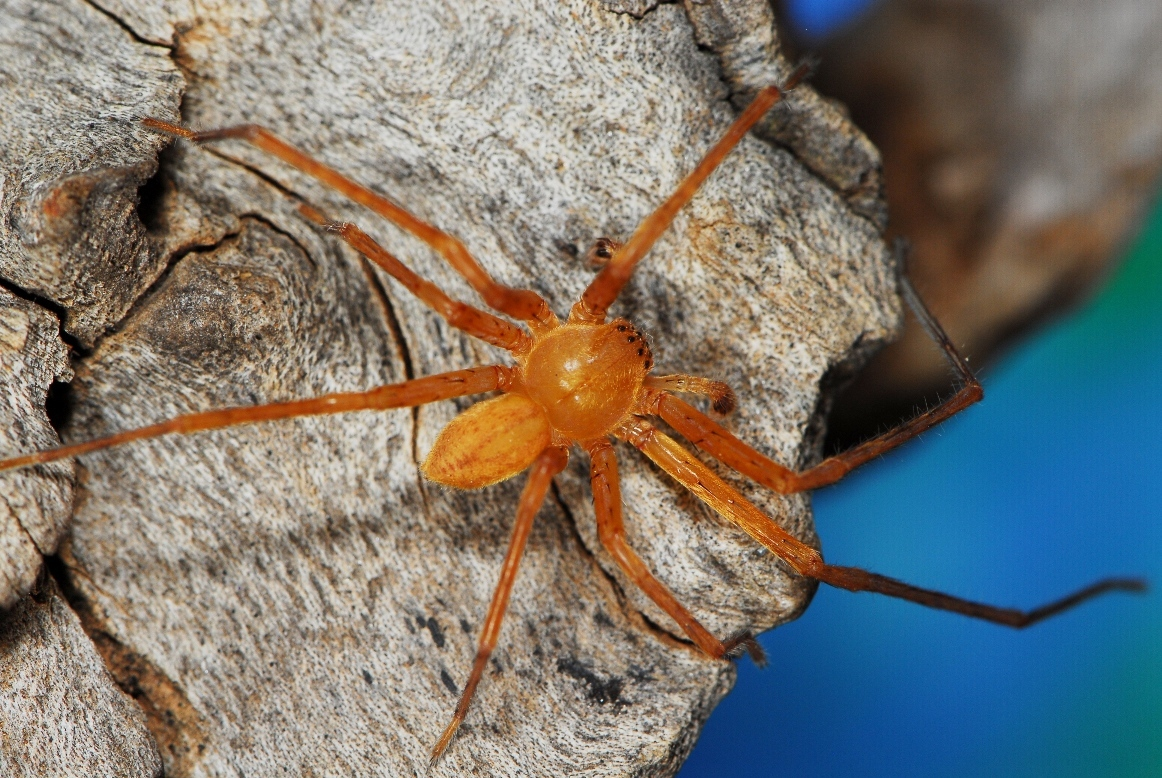
- male

Scientific classification
- Kingdom: Animalia
- Phylum: Arthropoda
- Subphylum: Chelicerata
- Class: Arachnida
- Order: Araneae
- Infraorder: Araneomorphae
- Family: Sparassidae
- Genus: Olios
- Species: O. biarmatus

Binomial name
- Olios biarmatus Lessert, 1925

= Olios biarmatus =

Umbilo Olios Huntsman Spider

Species of spider

Olios biarmatus is a species of spider in the family Sparassidae. It is endemic to South Africa and is commonly known as the Umbilo Olios huntsman spider.

== Distribution ==
Olios biarmatus is recorded from the South African provinces Eastern Cape and KwaZulu-Natal.

== Habitat and ecology ==
The species consists of nocturnal plant dwellers that wander around in search of prey on vegetation. Olios biarmatus has been sampled from the Indian Ocean Coastal Belt, Forest and Savanna biomes at altitudes ranging from 5 to 1,345 m above sea level.

== Description ==
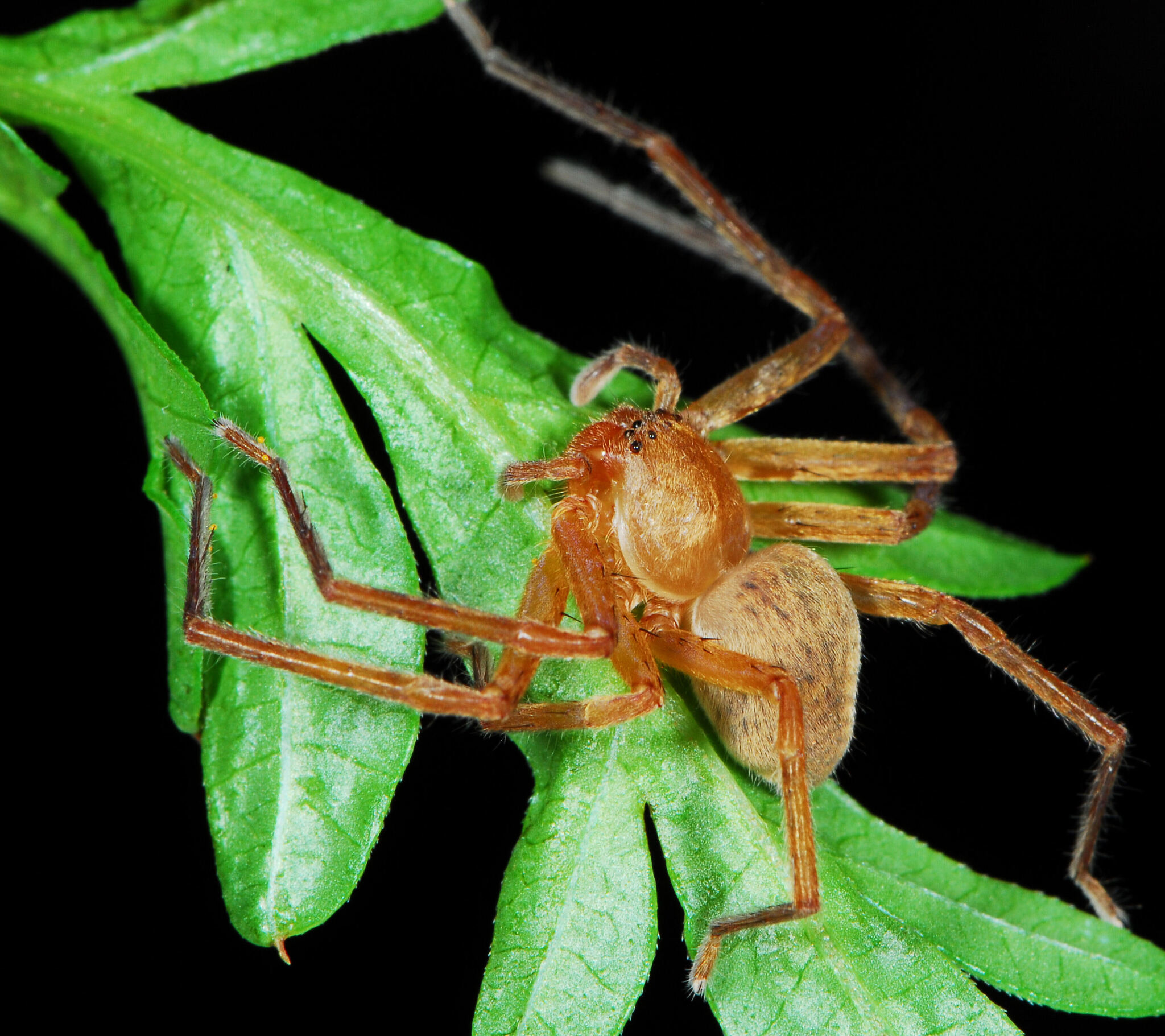
female

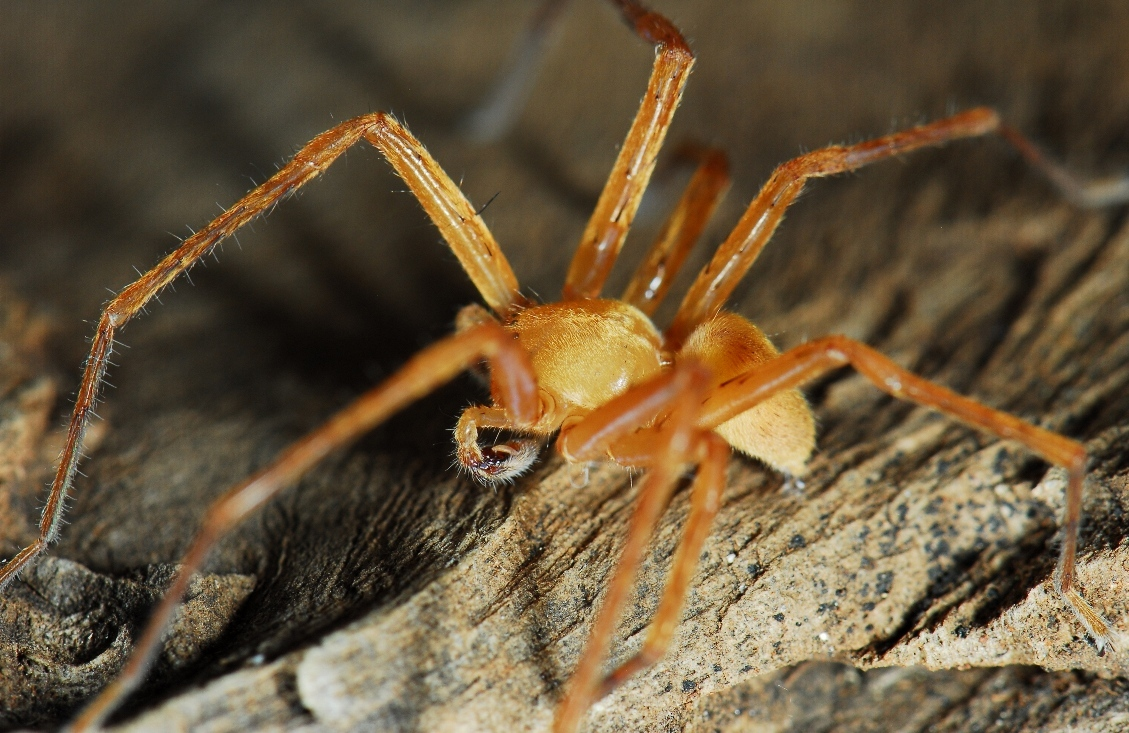
male

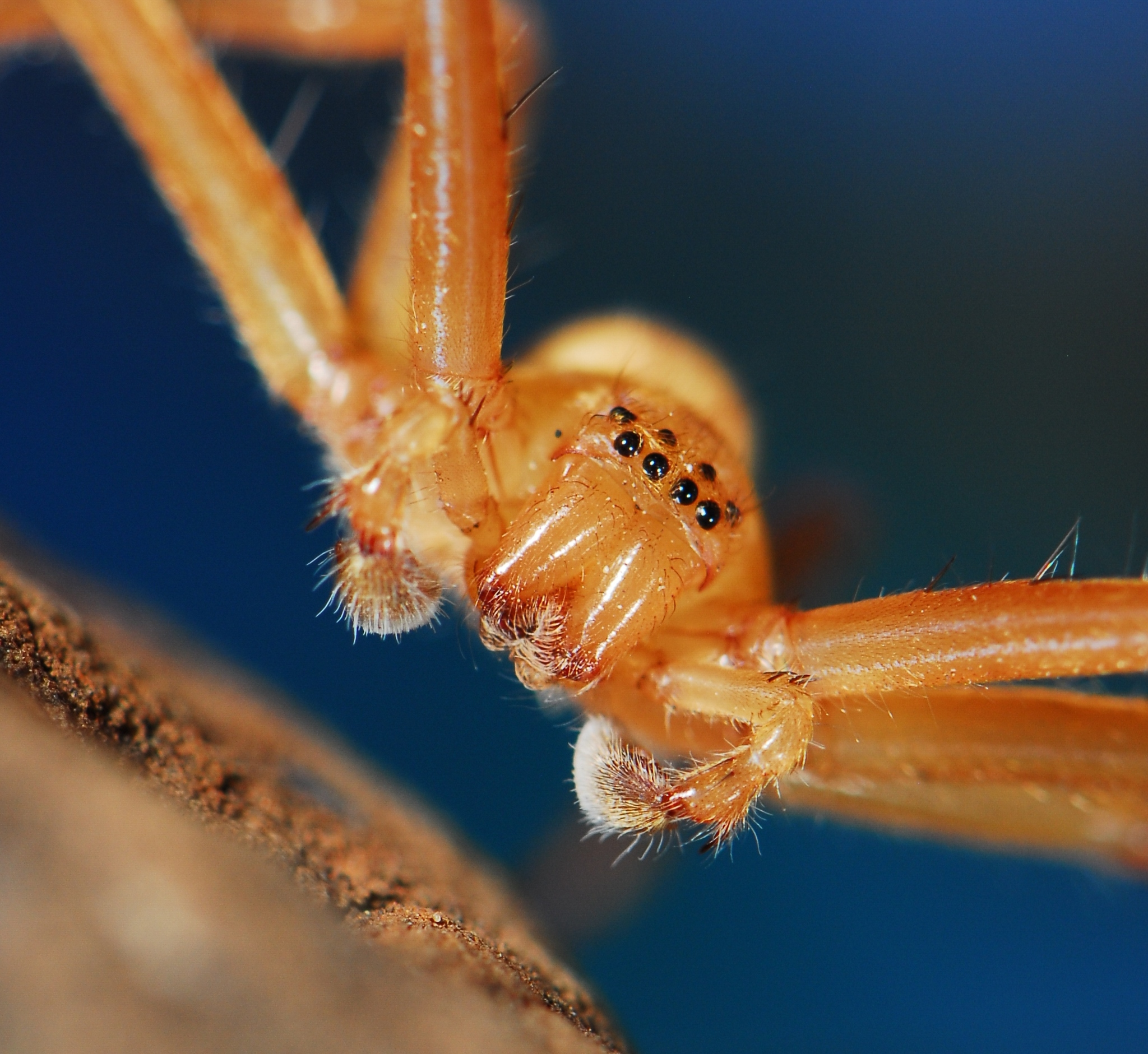
male

== Conservation ==
Olios biarmatus is listed as least concern by the South African National Biodiversity Institute due to its wide geographical range within South Africa. The species is protected in five protected areas including Mkambati Nature Reserve, Hluhluwe Nature Reserve, St. Lucia Nature Reserve, Vernon Crookes Nature Reserve and Enseleni Game Reserve.

== Taxonomy ==
Olios biarmatus was described by Lessert in 1925 from Umbilo in KwaZulu-Natal. According to Jäger (2020), this species is misplaced in Olios and may require generic reassignment in future taxonomic work.
