= Olios lacticolor =

Port Edward Olios Huntsman Spider

Scientific classification
- Kingdom: Animalia
- Phylum: Arthropoda
- Subphylum: Chelicerata
- Class: Arachnida
- Order: Araneae
- Infraorder: Araneomorphae
- Family: Sparassidae
- Genus: Olios
- Species: O. lacticolor

Binomial name
- Olios lacticolor Lawrence, 1952

Species of spider

Olios lacticolor is a species of spider in the family Sparassidae. It is endemic to South Africa and is commonly known as the Port Edward Olios huntsman spider.

== Distribution ==
Olios lacticolor is recorded from two provinces in South Africa, Eastern Cape and KwaZulu-Natal. The species has been collected at altitudes ranging from 19 to 63 m above sea level.

== Habitat and ecology ==
The species consists of nocturnal plant dwellers that wander around in search of prey on vegetation. Olios lacticolor has been sampled from the Indian Ocean Coastal Belt, Savanna and Thicket biomes.

== Conservation ==
Olios lacticolor is listed as data deficient. The status of the species remains obscure and more sampling is needed to determine the species' range.

== Etymology ==
The species name lacticolor derives from Latin, meaning "milk-colored".

== Taxonomy ==
Olios lacticolor was described by Lawrence in 1952 from Port Edward in KwaZulu-Natal. The species is known from both sexes. According to Jäger (2020), this species is misplaced in Olios and may require generic reassignment in future taxonomic work.
