= Olios sherwoodi =

Sherwood Olios Huntsman Spider

Scientific classification
- Kingdom: Animalia
- Phylum: Arthropoda
- Subphylum: Chelicerata
- Class: Arachnida
- Order: Araneae
- Infraorder: Araneomorphae
- Family: Sparassidae
- Genus: Olios
- Species: O. sherwoodi

Binomial name
- Olios sherwoodi Lessert, 1929

Species of spider

Olios sherwoodi is a species of spider in the family Sparassidae. It is found in Africa and is commonly known as the Sherwood Olios huntsman spider.

== Distribution ==
Olios sherwoodi is known from the Democratic Republic of the Congo, Namibia, and South Africa. In South Africa, it is recorded from the Northern Cape at altitudes ranging from 567 to 1,345 m above sea level.

== Habitat and ecology ==
The species consists of nocturnal plant dwellers that wander around on vegetation in search of prey. Olios sherwoodi has been sampled from the Nama Karoo biome.

== Conservation ==
Olios sherwoodi is listed as least concern by the South African National Biodiversity Institute due to its wide global range. The species is under-sampled and expected to occur in more African countries. In South Africa, it is protected in Augrabies National Park.

== Taxonomy ==
Olios sherwoodi was described by Lessert in 1929 from the Democratic Republic of the Congo. The species is described only from male specimens, also females have been photographed.
