= Olios hirtus =

Scientific classification
- Kingdom: Animalia
- Phylum: Arthropoda
- Subphylum: Chelicerata
- Class: Arachnida
- Order: Araneae
- Infraorder: Araneomorphae
- Family: Sparassidae
- Genus: Olios
- Species: O. hirtus

Binomial name
- Olios hirtus (Karsch, 1879)

Species of spider

Olios hirtus, is a species of spider of the genus Olios. It is endemic to Sri Lanka.
