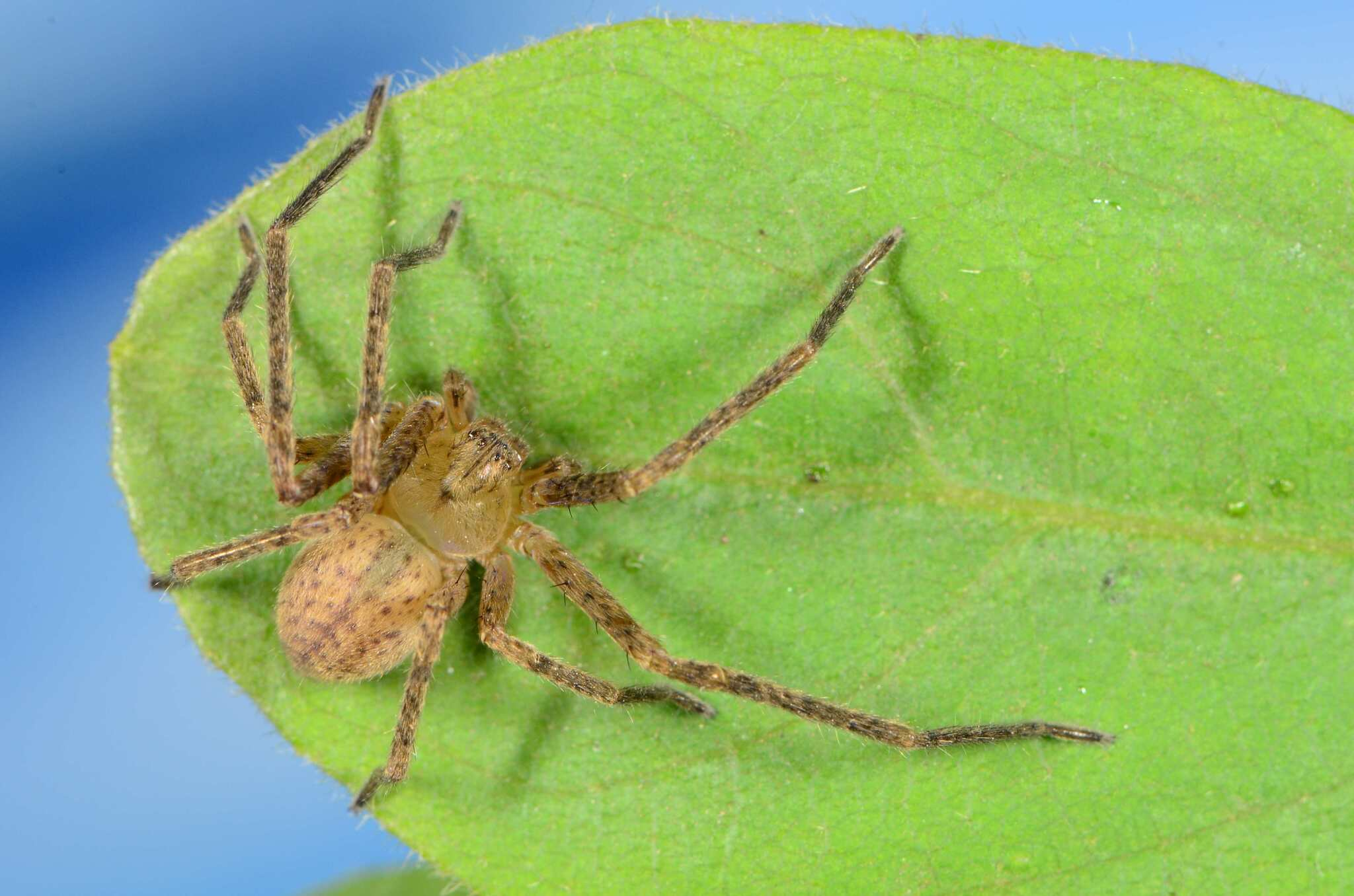
- female
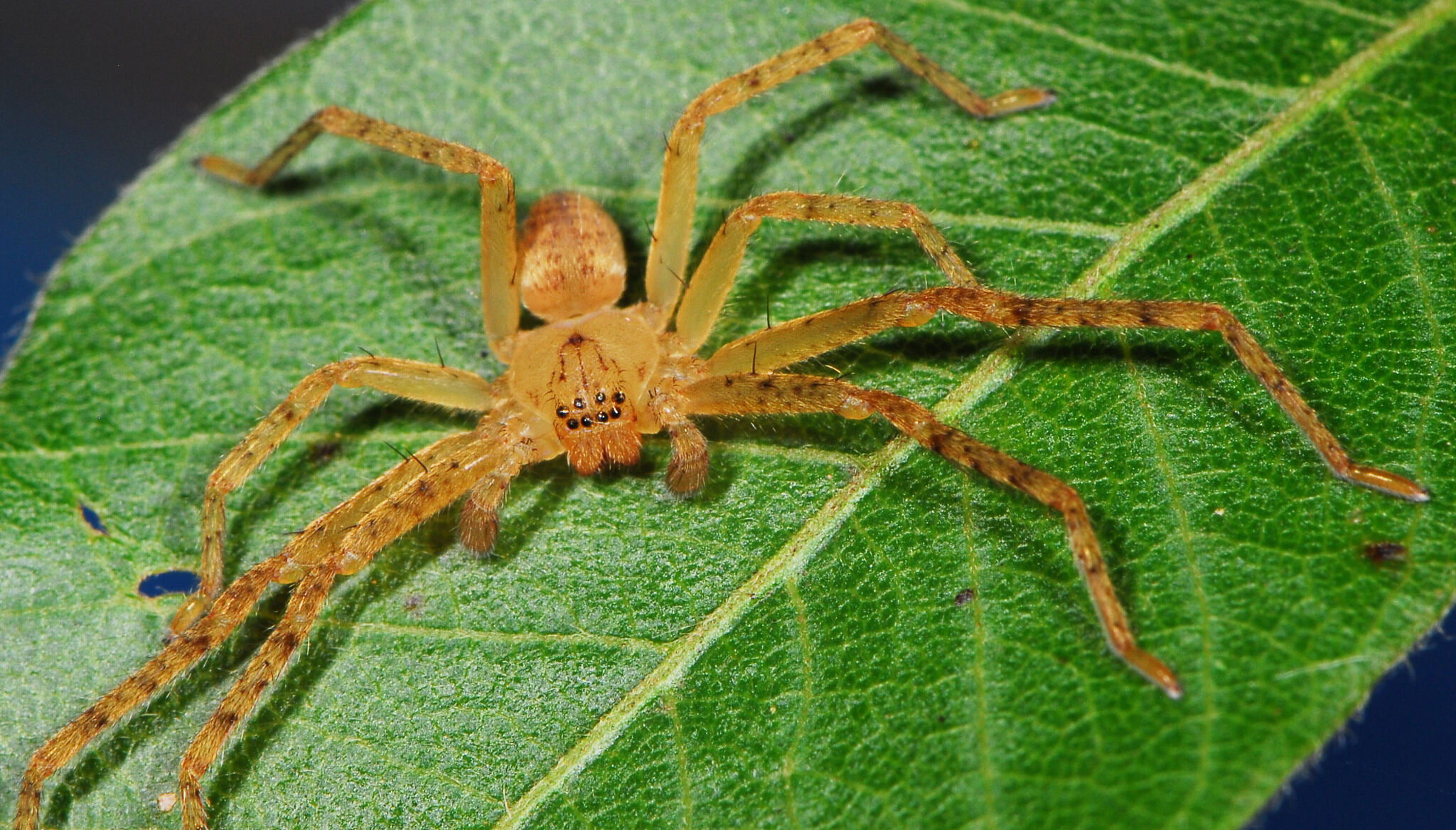
- juvenile male

Scientific classification
- Kingdom: Animalia
- Phylum: Arthropoda
- Subphylum: Chelicerata
- Class: Arachnida
- Order: Araneae
- Infraorder: Araneomorphae
- Family: Sparassidae
- Genus: Olios
- Species: O. freyi

Binomial name
- Olios freyi Lessert, 1929

= Olios freyi =

Congo Olios Huntsman Spider

Species of spider

Olios freyi is a species of spider in the family Sparassidae. It is found in Africa and is commonly known as the Congo Olios huntsman spider.

== Distribution ==
Olios freyi is known from the Democratic Republic of the Congo and South Africa. In South Africa, it is recorded only from Limpopo Province at an altitude of 552 m above sea level.

== Habitat and ecology ==
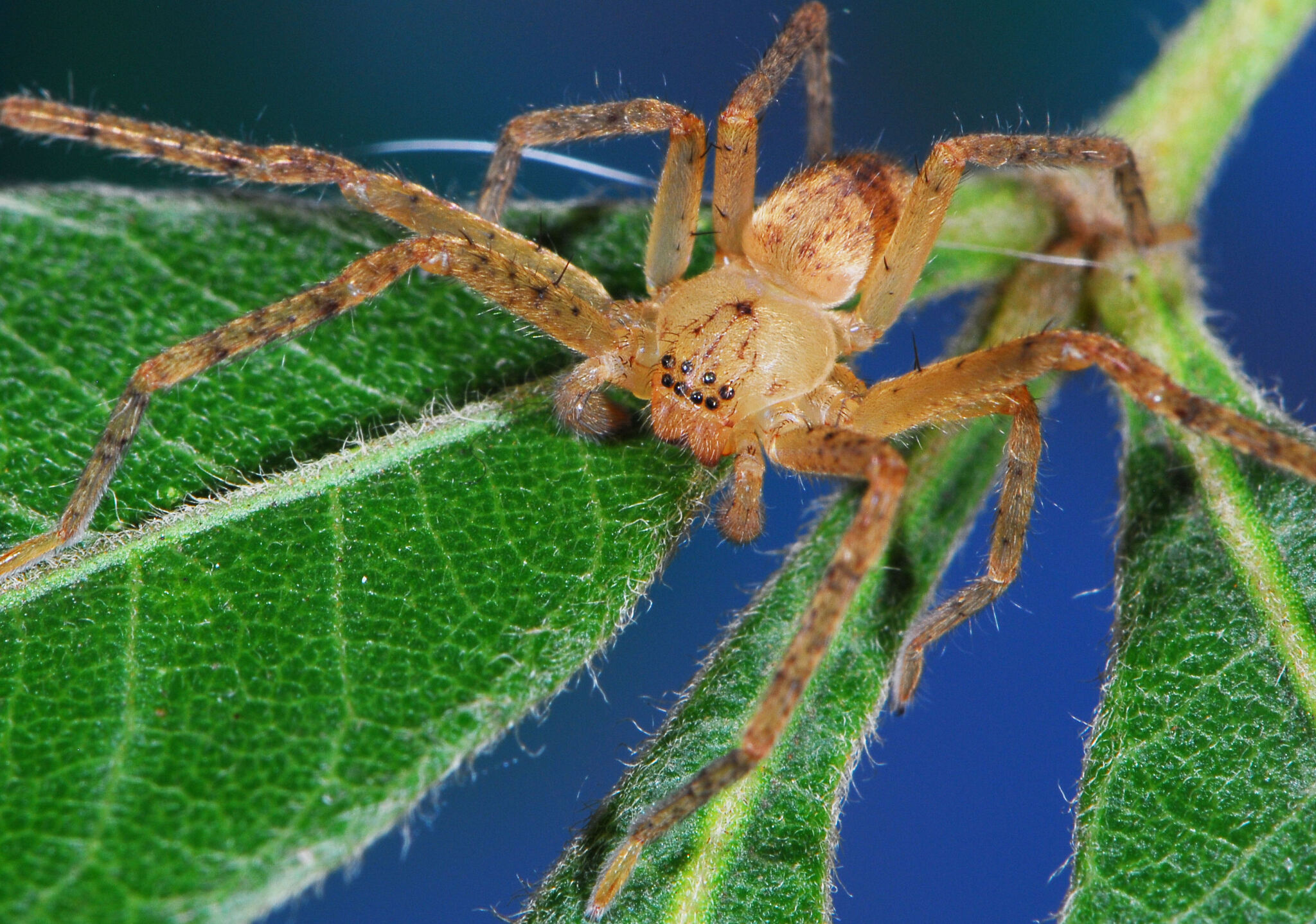
juvenile male

The species consists of nocturnal plant dwellers that wander around in search of prey on vegetation. They make their silk retreats between two leaves kept together with silk strands. Olios freyi has been sampled from the Savanna biome.

== Description ==
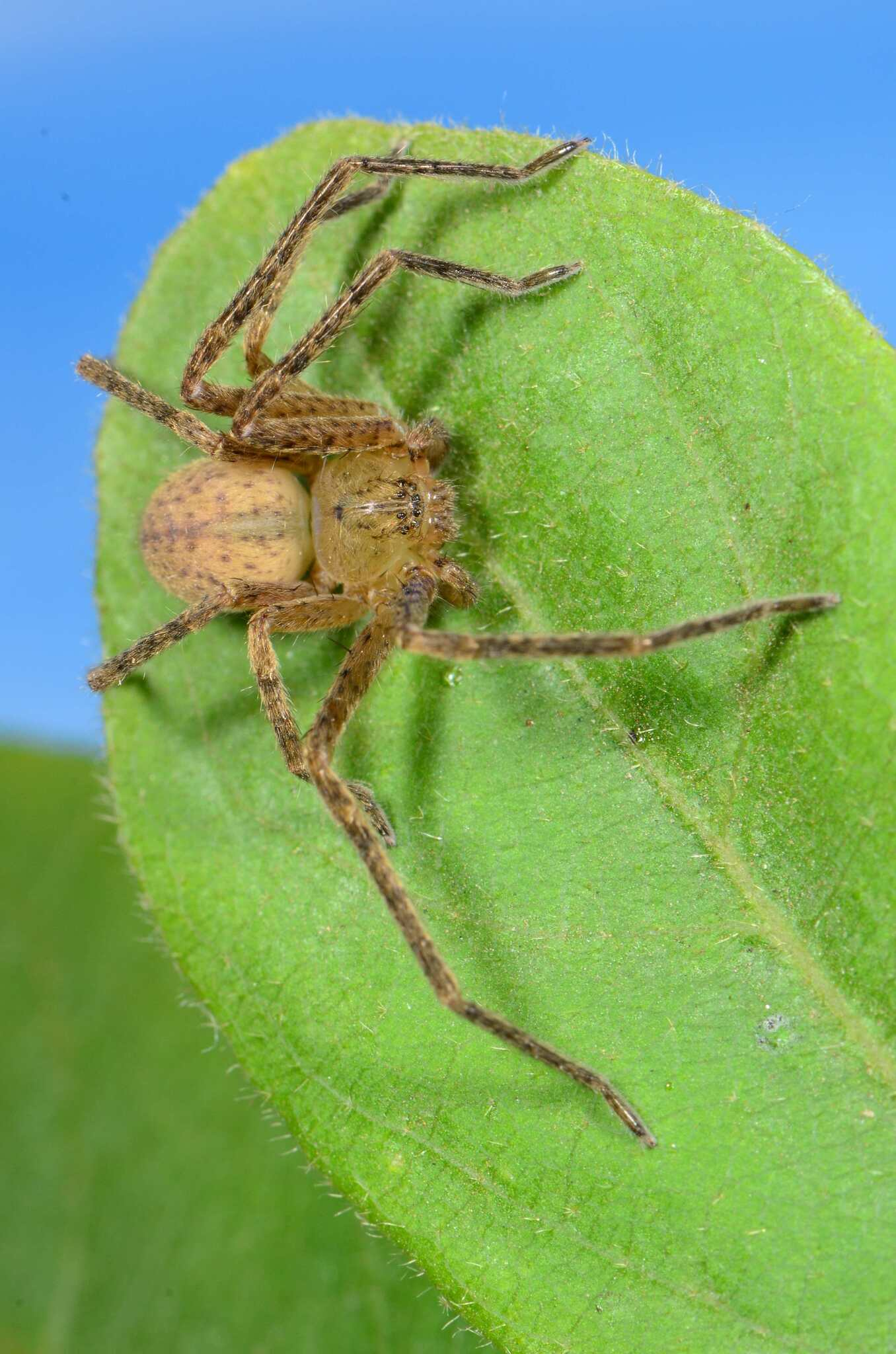
female

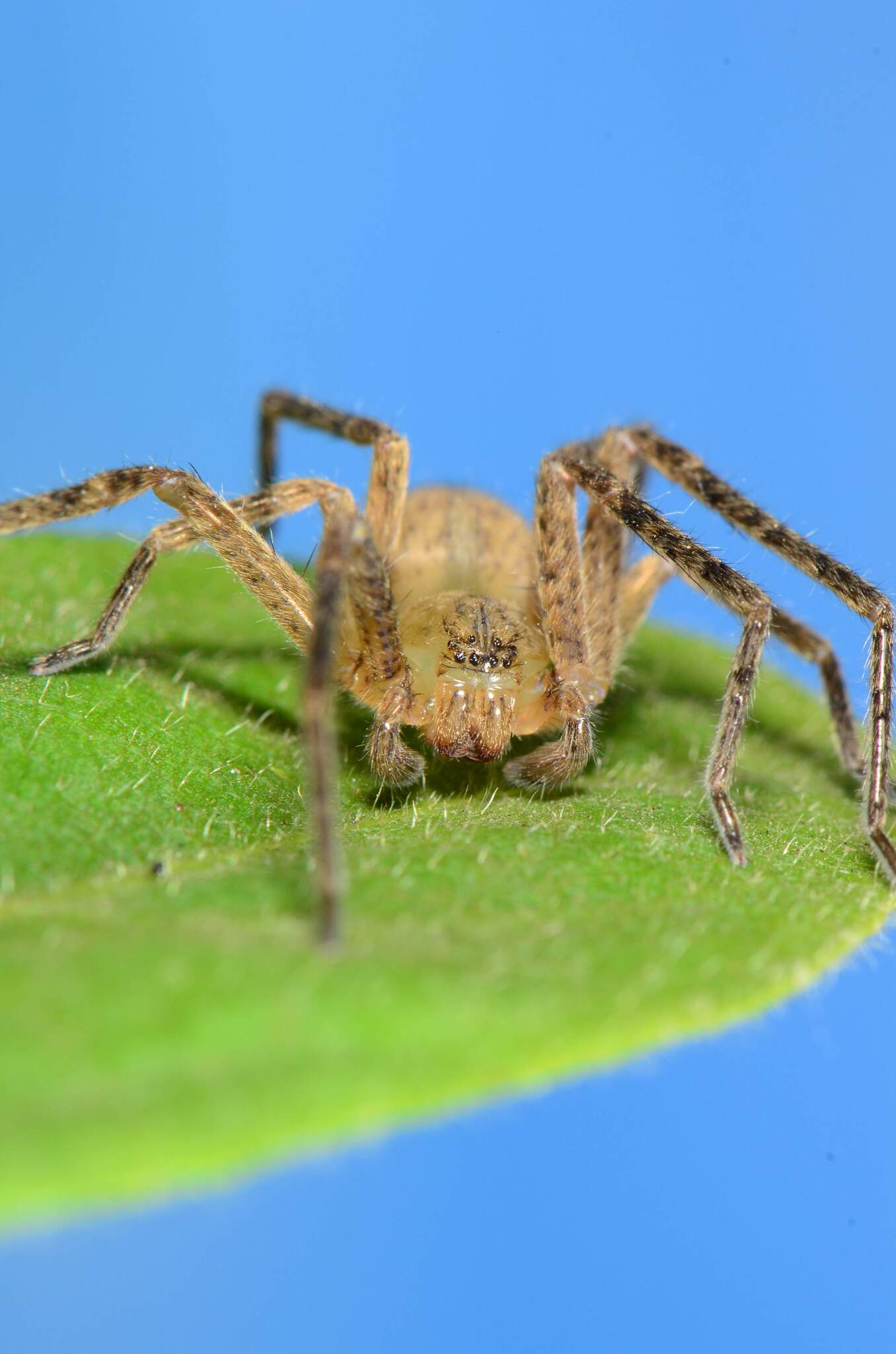
female

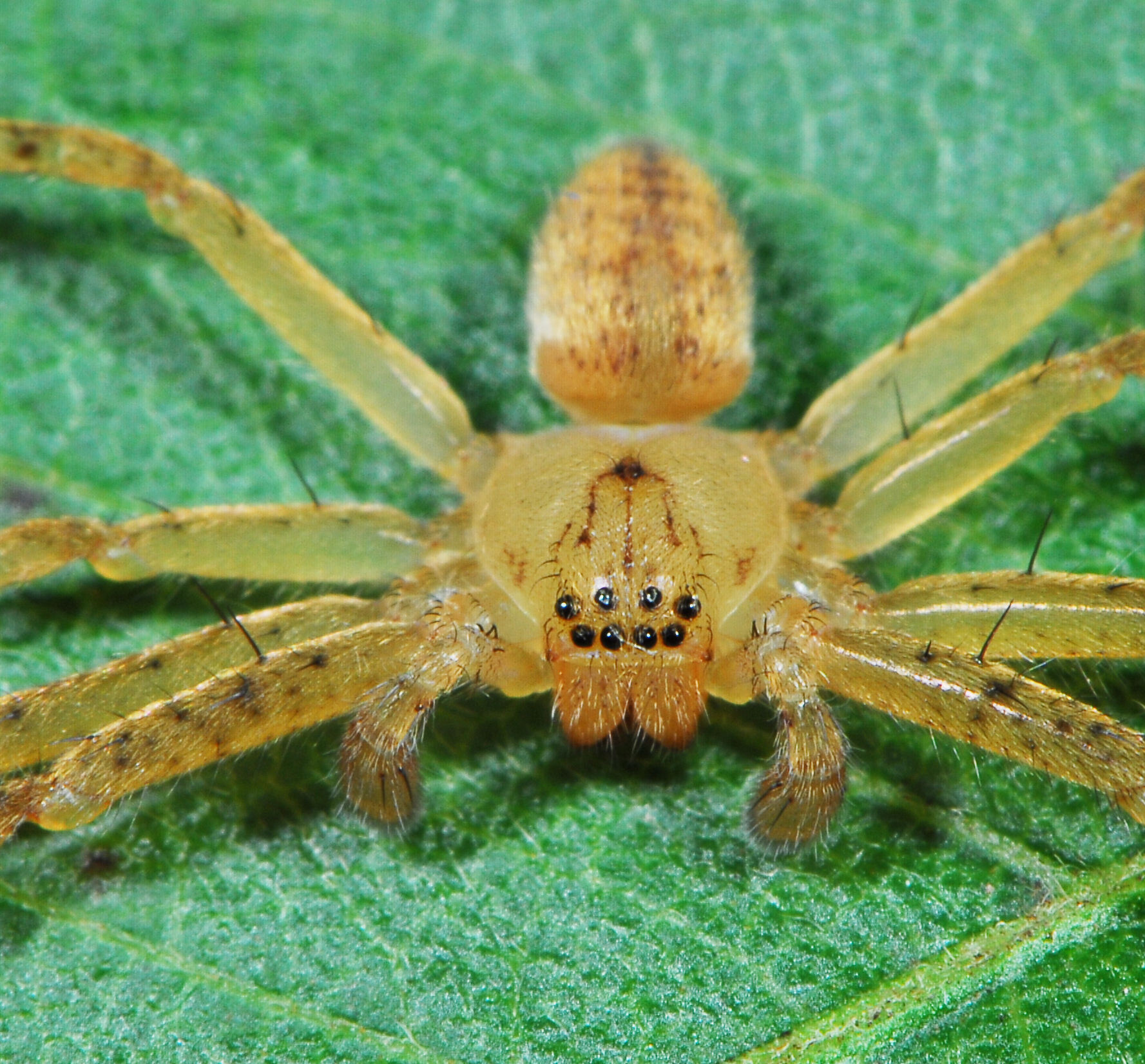
juvenile male

== Conservation ==
Olios freyi is listed as least concern by the South African National Biodiversity Institute due to its wide geographical range. The species is under-sampled and expected to occur in more African countries. In South Africa, it is protected in three protected areas, Blouberg Nature Reserve, Lekgalameetse Nature Reserve, and Woodbush Forest Reserve.

== Taxonomy ==
Olios freyi was described by Lessert in 1929 from what is now the Democratic Republic of the Congo. The species is known only from male specimens.
