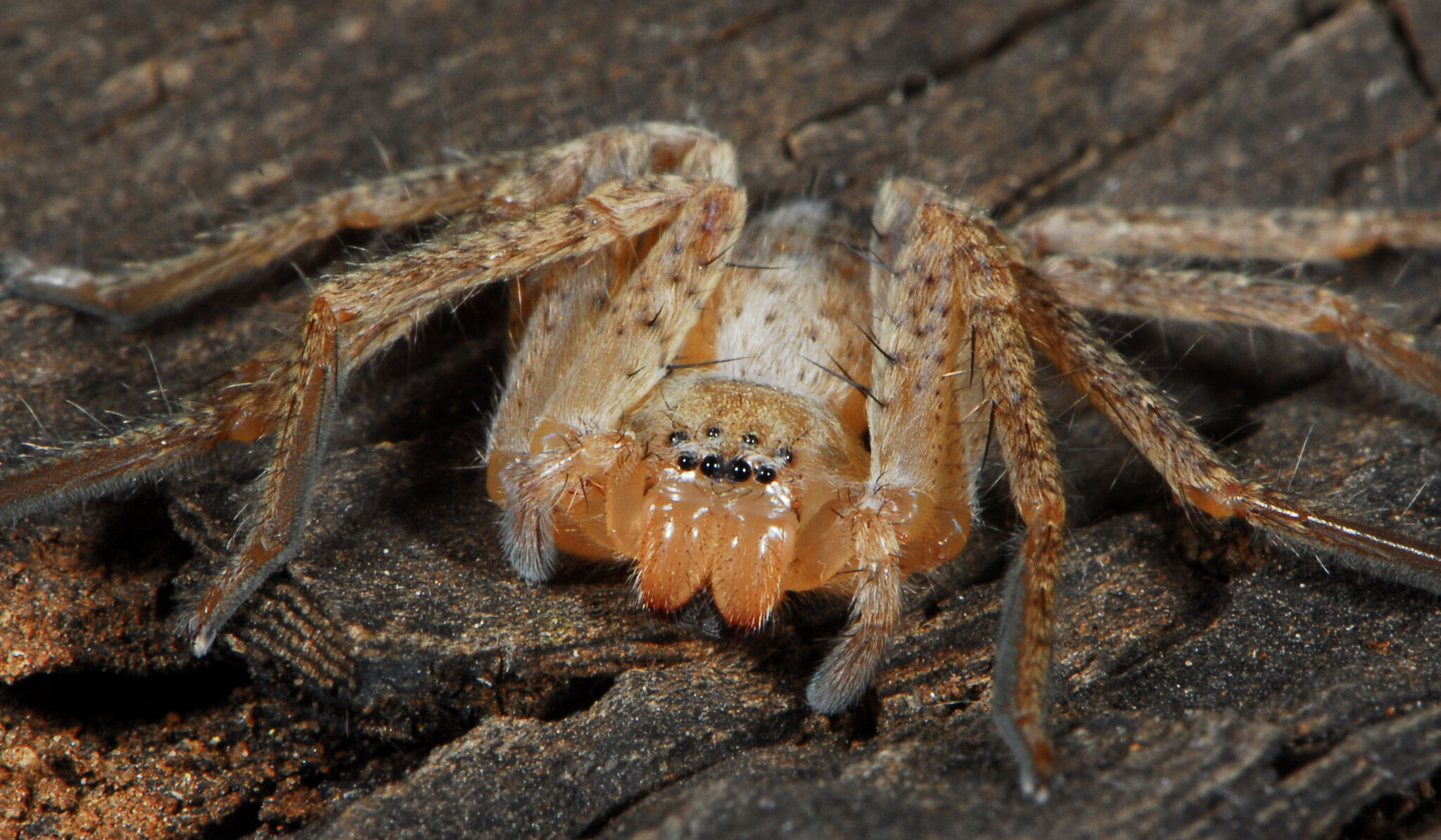
- female
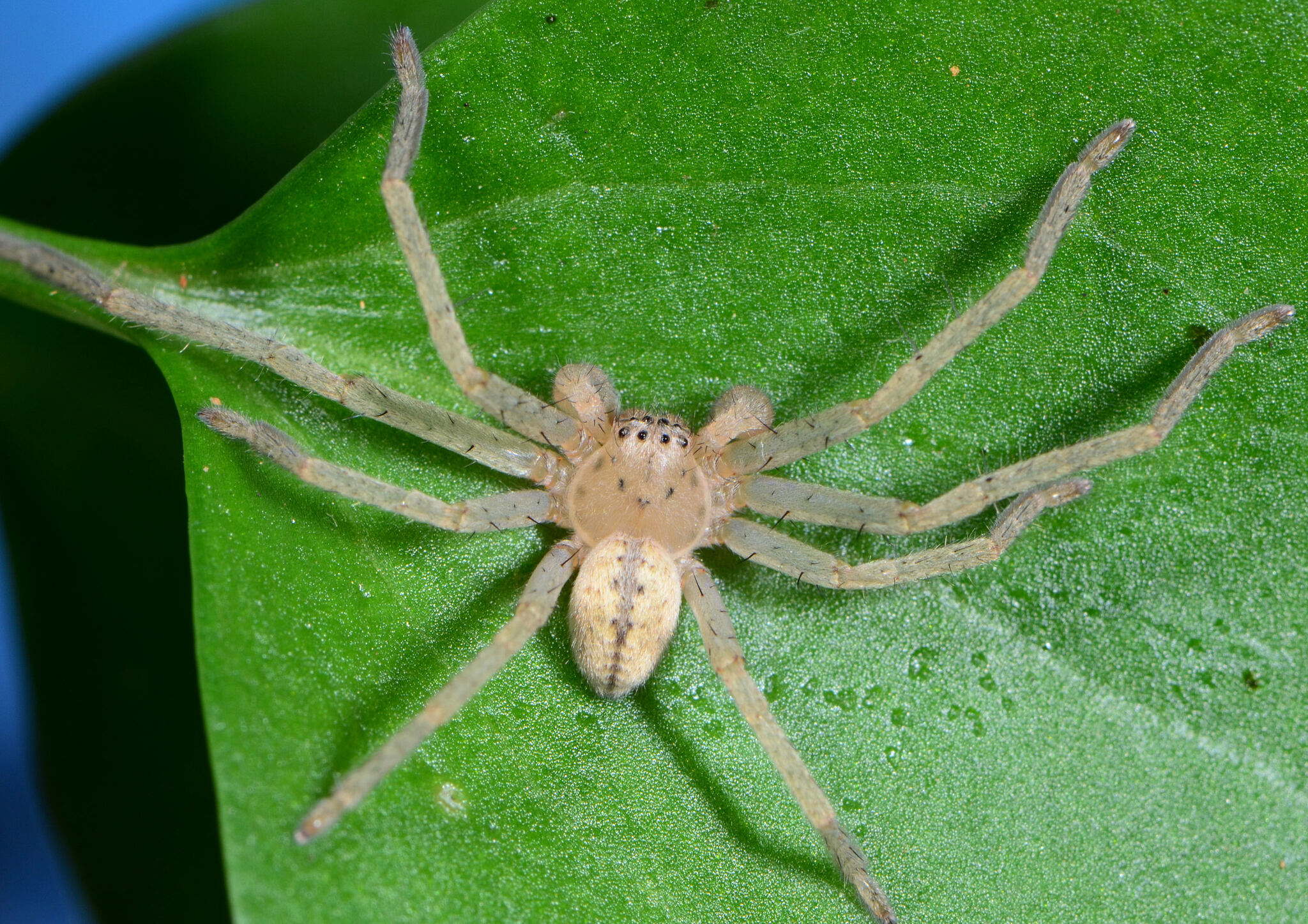
- juvenile male

Scientific classification
- Kingdom: Animalia
- Phylum: Arthropoda
- Subphylum: Chelicerata
- Class: Arachnida
- Order: Araneae
- Infraorder: Araneomorphae
- Family: Sparassidae
- Genus: Olios
- Species: O. fasciculatus

Binomial name
- Olios fasciculatus Simon, 1880

Synonyms
- Olios spenceri Pocock, 1896; Sparassus spenceri Pocock, 1898; Rhitymna werneri Simon, 1906; Olios albertius Strand, 1913; Olios banananus Strand, 1916; Olios aristophanei Lessert, 1936; Olios werneri Jäger, 2003

= Olios fasciculatus =

Species of spider

Olios fasciculatus is a species of spider in the family Sparassidae. It is found across Africa .

== Distribution ==
Olios fasciculatus has a wide distribution across Africa, occurring in Gabon, Guinea, Republic of the Congo, Democratic Republic of the Congo, South Sudan, Tanzania, and South Africa. In South Africa, the species is known only from KwaZulu-Natal at altitudes ranging from 131 to 1,345 m above sea level.

== Habitat and ecology ==
The species consists of nocturnal plant dwellers that wander around in search of prey on vegetation and make their silk retreats between two leaves kept together with silk strands. Olios fasciculatus has been sampled from vegetation.

== Description ==
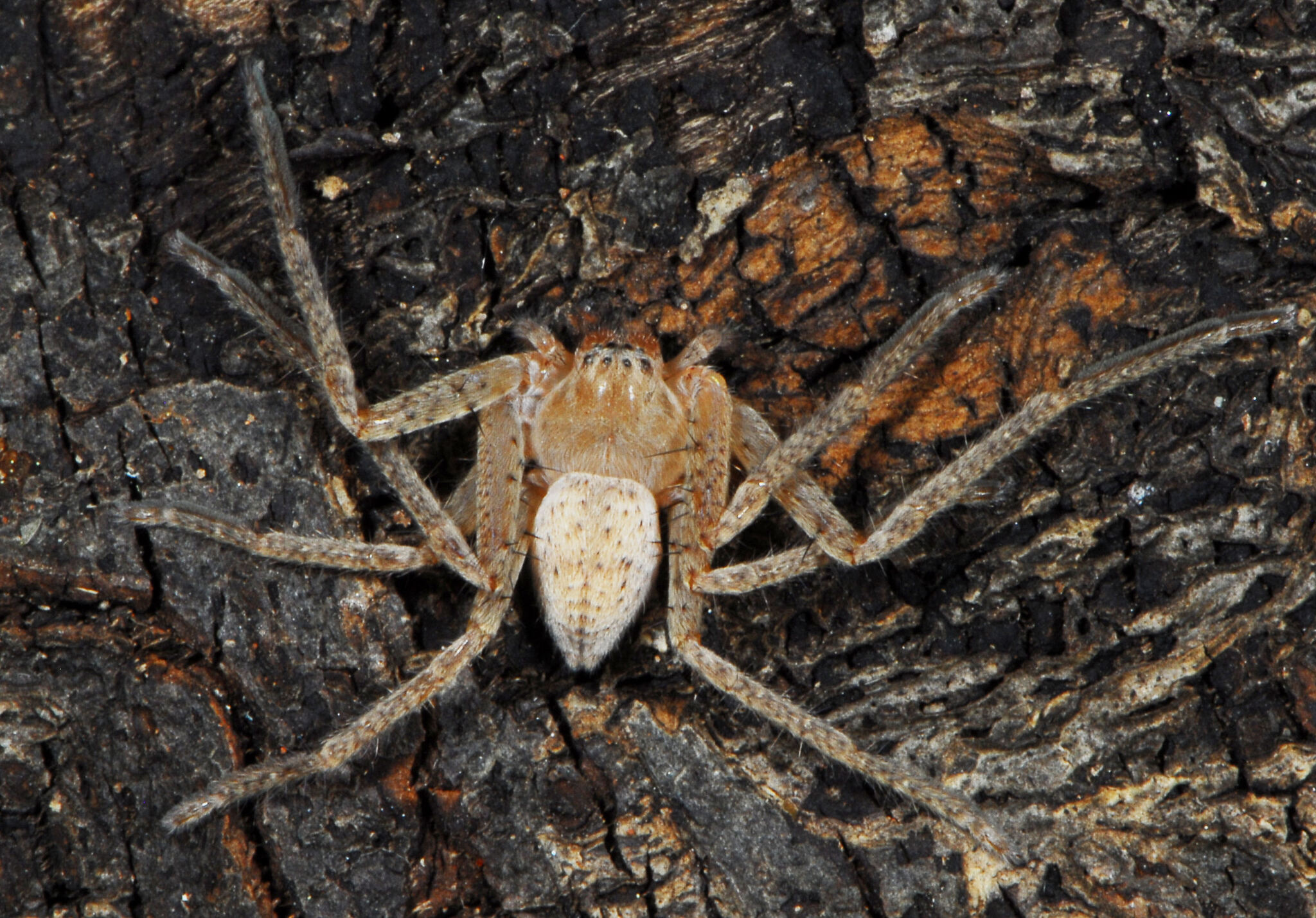
female

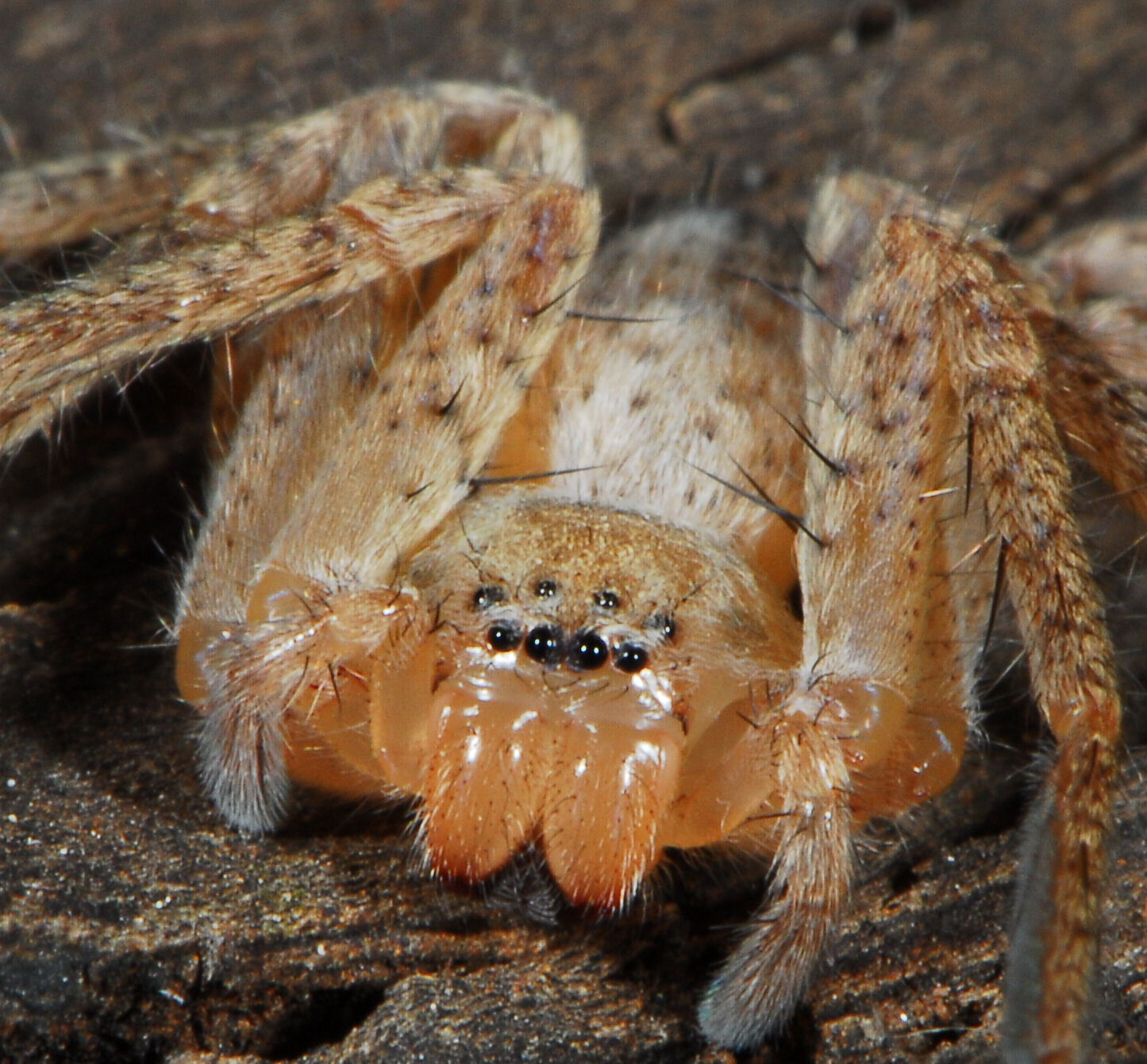
female

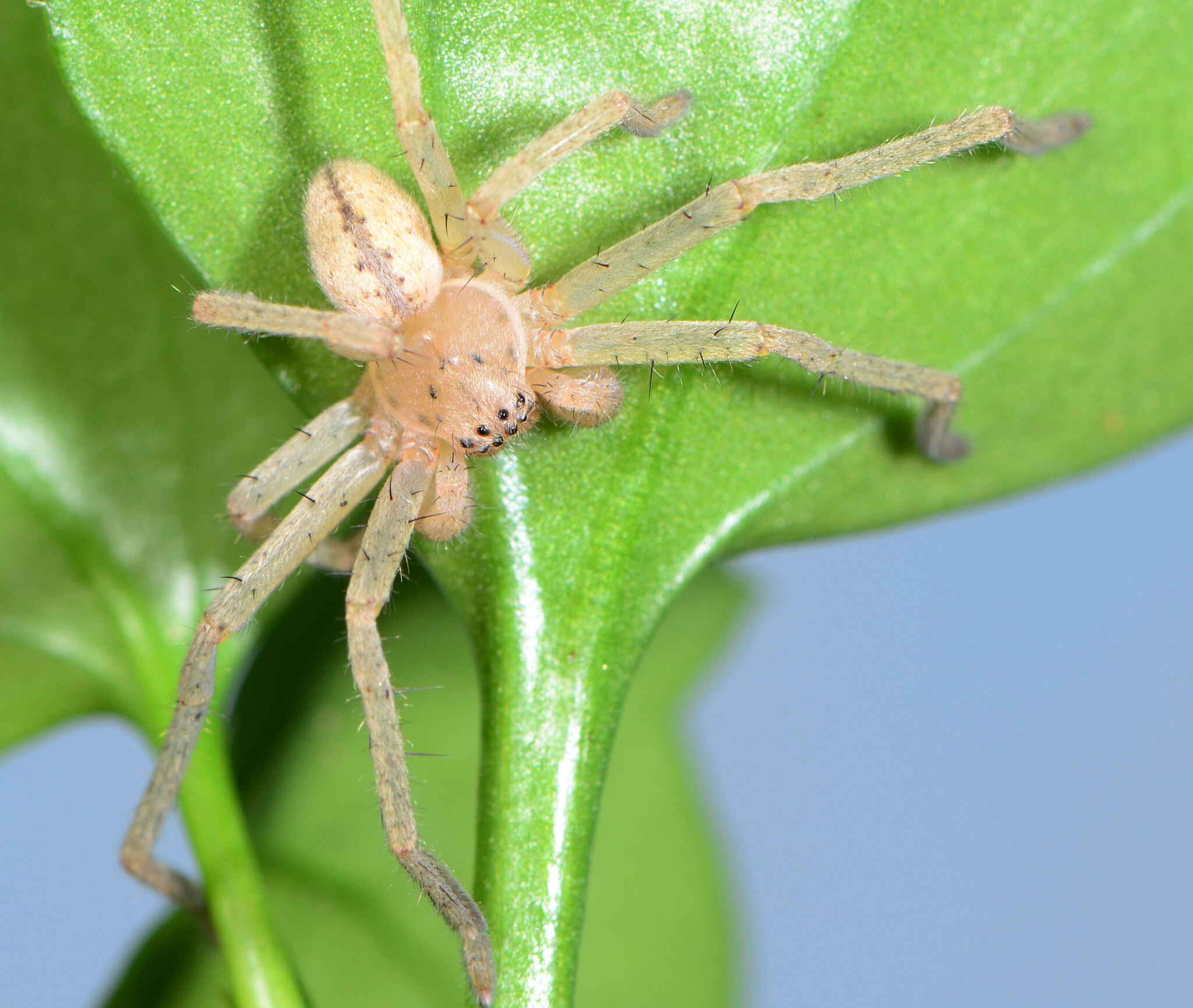
juvenile male

== Conservation ==
Olios fasciculatus is listed as least concern by the South African National Biodiversity Institute due to its wide geographical range across Africa. In South Africa, the species is protected in Mkuze Game Reserve and Ndumo Game Reserve.

== Taxonomy ==
Olios fasciculatus was originally described by Simon in 1880. The species has undergone significant taxonomic revision, with Jäger (2020) synonymizing several previously recognized species.
