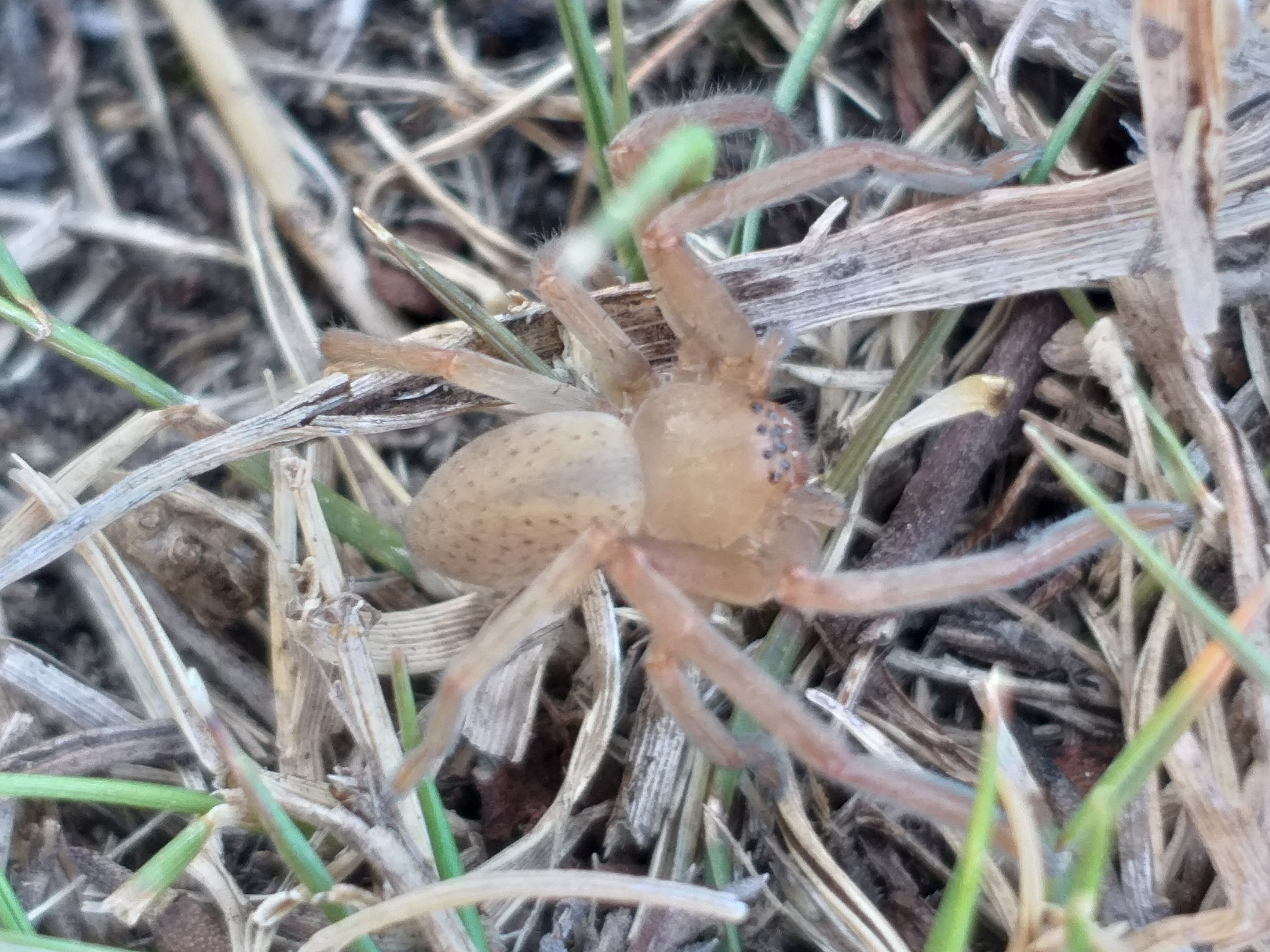

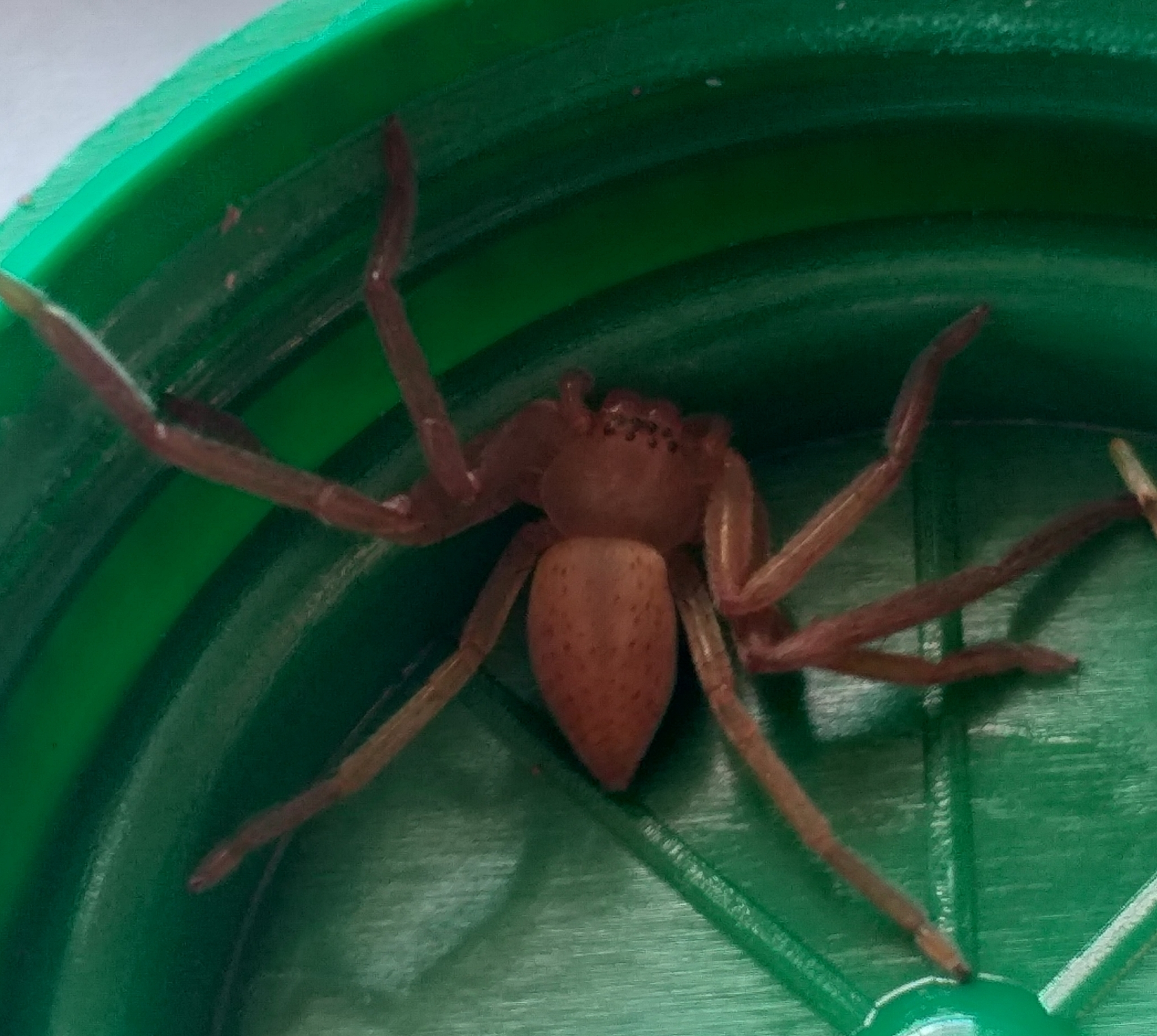

Scientific classification
- Kingdom: Animalia
- Phylum: Arthropoda
- Subphylum: Chelicerata
- Class: Arachnida
- Order: Araneae
- Infraorder: Araneomorphae
- Family: Sparassidae
- Genus: Olios
- Species: O. chelifer

Binomial name
- Olios chelifer Lawrence, 1937

= Olios chelifer =

Spotted Olios Huntsman Spider

Species of spider

Olios chelifer is a species of spider in the family Sparassidae. It is endemic to South Africa and is commonly known as the spotted Olios huntsman spider.

== Distribution ==
Olios chelifer is recorded from three provinces in South Africa: KwaZulu-Natal, Mpumalanga, and Limpopo.

== Habitat and ecology ==
The species consists of nocturnal plant dwellers that wander around in search of prey on the vegetation. Olios chelifer has been sampled from the Indian Ocean Coastal Belt and Savanna biomes at altitudes ranging from 47 to 1,973 m above sea level.

== Conservation ==
Olios chelifer is listed as least concern by the South African National Biodiversity Institute. Although the species is presently known only from the male sex, it has a wide geographical range and is therefore listed as Least Concern. The species is protected in Kosi Bay Nature Reserve, Ndumo Game Reserve, Tembe Elephant Park and Lowveld National Botanical Gardens.

== Etymology ==
The species name chelifer derives from Greek, meaning "claw-bearer".

== Taxonomy ==
Olios chelifer was described by Lawrence in 1937 from Kosi Bay in KwaZulu-Natal. The species is known only from male specimens. According to Jäger (2020), this species is misplaced in Olios and may require generic reassignment in future taxonomic work.
