= Olios marshalli =

Estcourt Olios Huntsman Spider

Scientific classification
- Kingdom: Animalia
- Phylum: Arthropoda
- Subphylum: Chelicerata
- Class: Arachnida
- Order: Araneae
- Infraorder: Araneomorphae
- Family: Sparassidae
- Genus: Olios
- Species: O. marshalli

Binomial name
- Olios marshalli (Pocock, 1898)

Synonyms
- Sparassus (Midamus) marshalli Pocock, 1898

Species of spider

Olios marshalli is a species of spider in the family Sparassidae. It is endemic to South Africa and is commonly known as the Estcourt Olios huntsman spider.

== Distribution ==
Olios marshalli is known only from Estcourt in KwaZulu-Natal at an altitude of 1,189 m above sea level.

== Habitat and ecology ==
The species is a plant dweller that has been sampled from the Savanna biome.

== Conservation ==
Olios marshalli is listed as data deficient for taxonomic reasons. The species is known only from one female from the type locality and the status of the species remains obscure. More sampling is needed to collect the male and to determine the species' range.

== Taxonomy ==
Olios marshalli was originally described by Pocock in 1898 as Sparassus (Midamus) marshalli from specimens collected in Eastcourt (now Estcourt). The species is known only from one female specimen. According to Dippenaar (2022), this species is misplaced in Olios.
