= Olios machadoi =

Machado's Olios Huntsman Spider

Scientific classification
- Kingdom: Animalia
- Phylum: Arthropoda
- Subphylum: Chelicerata
- Class: Arachnida
- Order: Araneae
- Infraorder: Araneomorphae
- Family: Sparassidae
- Genus: Olios
- Species: O. machadoi

Binomial name
- Olios machadoi Lawrence, 1952

Species of spider

Olios machadoi is a species of spider in the family Sparassidae. It is endemic to South Africa and is commonly known as Machado's Olios huntsman spider.

== Distribution ==
Olios machadoi is recorded from four provinces in South Africa, Eastern Cape, KwaZulu-Natal, Mpumalanga, and Western Cape. The species has been collected at altitudes ranging from 34 to 1,319 m above sea level.

== Habitat and ecology ==
The species consists of nocturnal plant dwellers that wander around in search of prey on vegetation and make their silk retreats between two leaves kept together with silk strands. Olios machadoi has been sampled from Forest, Grassland, Nama Karoo and Savanna biomes.

== Conservation ==
Olios machadoi is listed as least concern by the South African National Biodiversity Institute due to its wide geographical range. The species is protected in six protected areas including Ndumo Game Reserve, Mkambati Nature Reserve, Kosi Bay Nature Reserve, Tembe Elephant Park, Kruger National Park, and Gamkaberg Nature Reserve.

== Taxonomy ==
Olios machadoi was described by Lawrence in 1952 from Pietermaritzburg in KwaZulu-Natal. This species is misplaced in Olios.
