= Olios kunzi =

Kunz Olios Huntsman Spider

Scientific classification
- Kingdom: Animalia
- Phylum: Arthropoda
- Subphylum: Chelicerata
- Class: Arachnida
- Order: Araneae
- Infraorder: Araneomorphae
- Family: Sparassidae
- Genus: Olios
- Species: O. kunzi

Binomial name
- Olios kunzi Jäger, 2020

Species of spider

Olios kunzi is a species of spider in the family Sparassidae. It is found in southern Africa and is commonly known as the Kunz Olios huntsman spider.

== Distribution ==
Olios kunzi is known from Namibia, possibly Zambia, and South Africa. In South Africa, it is recorded only from Free State Province at an altitude of 1,303 m above sea level.

== Habitat and ecology ==
Specimens from South Africa have been collected from under stones in grassland.

== Description ==
Olios kunzi has a yellowish-brown carapace with the fovea reddish-brown and reddish-brown chelicerae. The legs are slightly darker distally. The abdomen dorsally displays a tuning-fork pattern and few lateral dots, while ventrally it has few dots.

== Conservation ==
Olios kunzi is listed as least concern by the South African National Biodiversity Institute due to its wide distribution range across southern Africa.

== Taxonomy ==
Olios kunzi was described by Jäger in 2020 from specimens collected in Windhoek, Namibia. The species is known from both sexes.
