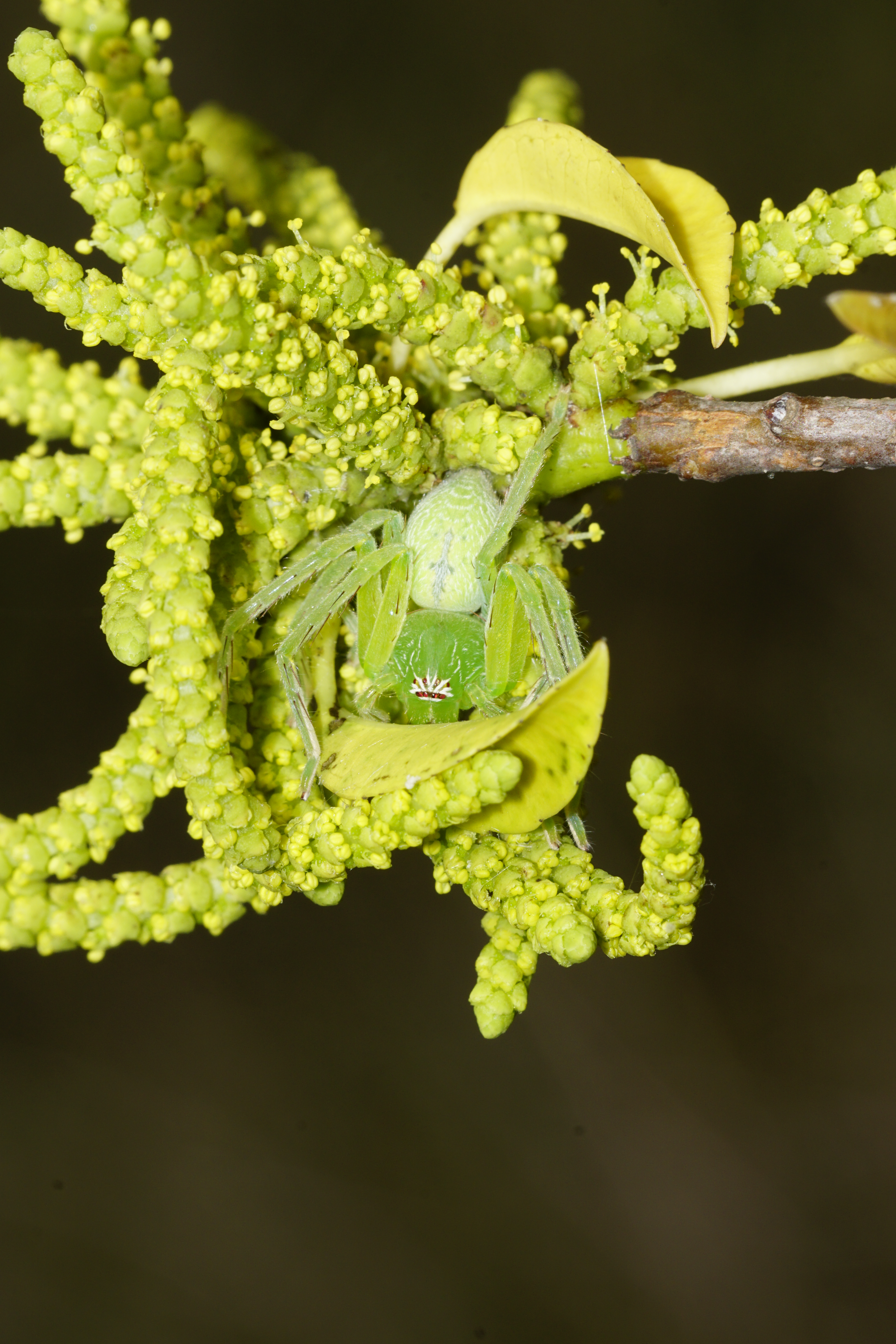

Scientific classification
- Kingdom: Animalia
- Phylum: Arthropoda
- Subphylum: Chelicerata
- Class: Arachnida
- Order: Araneae
- Infraorder: Araneomorphae
- Family: Sparassidae
- Genus: Olios
- Species: O. milleti

Binomial name
- Olios milleti (Pocock, 1901)

= Olios milleti =

Species of spider

Olios milleti, is a species of spider of the genus Olios. It is native to India and Sri Lanka. According to SpiderID, Olios milleti is most often sighted outdoors during the month of February.
