= Olios greeni =

Scientific classification
- Kingdom: Animalia
- Phylum: Arthropoda
- Subphylum: Chelicerata
- Class: Arachnida
- Order: Araneae
- Infraorder: Araneomorphae
- Family: Sparassidae
- Genus: Olios
- Species: O. greeni

Binomial name
- Olios greeni (Pocock, 1901)

Species of spider

Olios greeni, is a species of spider of the genus Olios. It is endemic to Sri Lanka.
