= Olios fonticola =

Grahamstown Olios Huntsman Spider

Scientific classification
- Kingdom: Animalia
- Phylum: Arthropoda
- Subphylum: Chelicerata
- Class: Arachnida
- Order: Araneae
- Infraorder: Araneomorphae
- Family: Sparassidae
- Genus: Olios
- Species: O. fonticola

Binomial name
- Olios fonticola (Pocock, 1902)

Synonyms
- Sparassus fonticola Pocock, 1902

Species of spider

Olios fonticola is a species of spider in the family Sparassidae. It is endemic to South Africa and is commonly known as the Grahamstown Olios huntsman spider.

== Distribution ==
Olios fonticola is known only from the type locality of Makhanda (formerly Grahamstown) in the Eastern Cape at an altitude of 552 m above sea level.

== Habitat and ecology ==
Nothing is known about the lifestyle of this species.

== Conservation ==
Olios fonticola is listed as data deficient for taxonomic reasons. The species is known only from the type locality and the status of the species remains obscure. More sampling is needed to collect the male and to determine the species' range.

== Taxonomy ==
Olios fonticola was originally described by Pocock in 1902 as Sparassus fonticola from specimens collected at Tea Fountain near Grahamstown. The species is known only from female specimens. According to Jäger (2020), this species is misplaced in Olios and may require generic reassignment in future taxonomic work.
