= Olios brachycephalus =

Pietermaritzburg Olios Huntsman Spider

Scientific classification
- Kingdom: Animalia
- Phylum: Arthropoda
- Subphylum: Chelicerata
- Class: Arachnida
- Order: Araneae
- Infraorder: Araneomorphae
- Family: Sparassidae
- Genus: Olios
- Species: O. brachycephalus

Binomial name
- Olios brachycephalus Lawrence, 1938

Species of spider

Olios brachycephalus is a species of spider in the family Sparassidae. It is endemic to South Africa and is commonly known as the Pietermaritzburg Olios huntsman spider.

== Distribution ==
Olios brachycephalus is recorded from two provinces in South Africa, KwaZulu-Natal and Eastern Cape. The species has been collected at altitudes ranging from 91 to 647 m above sea level.

== Habitat and ecology ==
The species consists of nocturnal plant dwellers that wander around in search of prey on vegetation and make their silk retreats between two leaves kept together with silk strands. Olios brachycephalus is known from the Savanna biome.

== Conservation ==
Olios brachycephalus is listed as least concern by the South African National Biodiversity Institute. Although only known from the male sex, this species has a wide enough distribution for an assessment to be made. As much natural habitat remains within its range, it is likely under-collected and more than half of current records come from protected areas where it is not threatened. The species is protected in Tembe Elephant Park and Kwandwe Private Game Reserve.

== Etymology ==
The species name brachycephalus derives from Greek, meaning "short-headed".

== Taxonomy ==
Olios brachycephalus was described by Lawrence in 1938 from Pietermaritzburg in KwaZulu-Natal. The species is known only from male specimens.
