= Olios kruegeri =

Pretoria Olios Huntsman Spider

Scientific classification
- Kingdom: Animalia
- Phylum: Arthropoda
- Subphylum: Chelicerata
- Class: Arachnida
- Order: Araneae
- Infraorder: Araneomorphae
- Family: Sparassidae
- Genus: Olios
- Species: O. kruegeri

Binomial name
- Olios kruegeri (Simon, 1897)

Synonyms
- Sparassus kruegeri Simon, 1897

Species of spider

Olios kruegeri is a species of spider in the family Sparassidae. It is endemic to South Africa and is commonly known as the Pretoria Olios huntsman spider.

== Distribution ==
Olios kruegeri is known only from Pretoria in Gauteng at an altitude of 1,303 m above sea level. The species was sampled prior to 1897 and is known only from the type locality.

== Habitat and ecology ==
The species is a plant dweller that has been sampled from the Grassland biome.

== Conservation ==
Olios kruegeri is listed as data deficient. The status of the species remains obscure and more sampling is needed to determine the species' current status and range.

== Taxonomy ==
Olios kruegeri was originally described by Simon in 1897 as Sparassus kruegeri from specimens collected in Pretoria. The species is known from both sexes, but only the male has been partly illustrated.
