= Olios suavis =

Scientific classification
- Kingdom: Animalia
- Phylum: Arthropoda
- Subphylum: Chelicerata
- Class: Arachnida
- Order: Araneae
- Infraorder: Araneomorphae
- Family: Sparassidae
- Genus: Olios
- Species: O. suavis

Binomial name
- Olios suavis (O. P.-Cambridge, 1876)

Species of spider

Olios suavis is a spider species found in Cyprus, Israel and Egypt.
