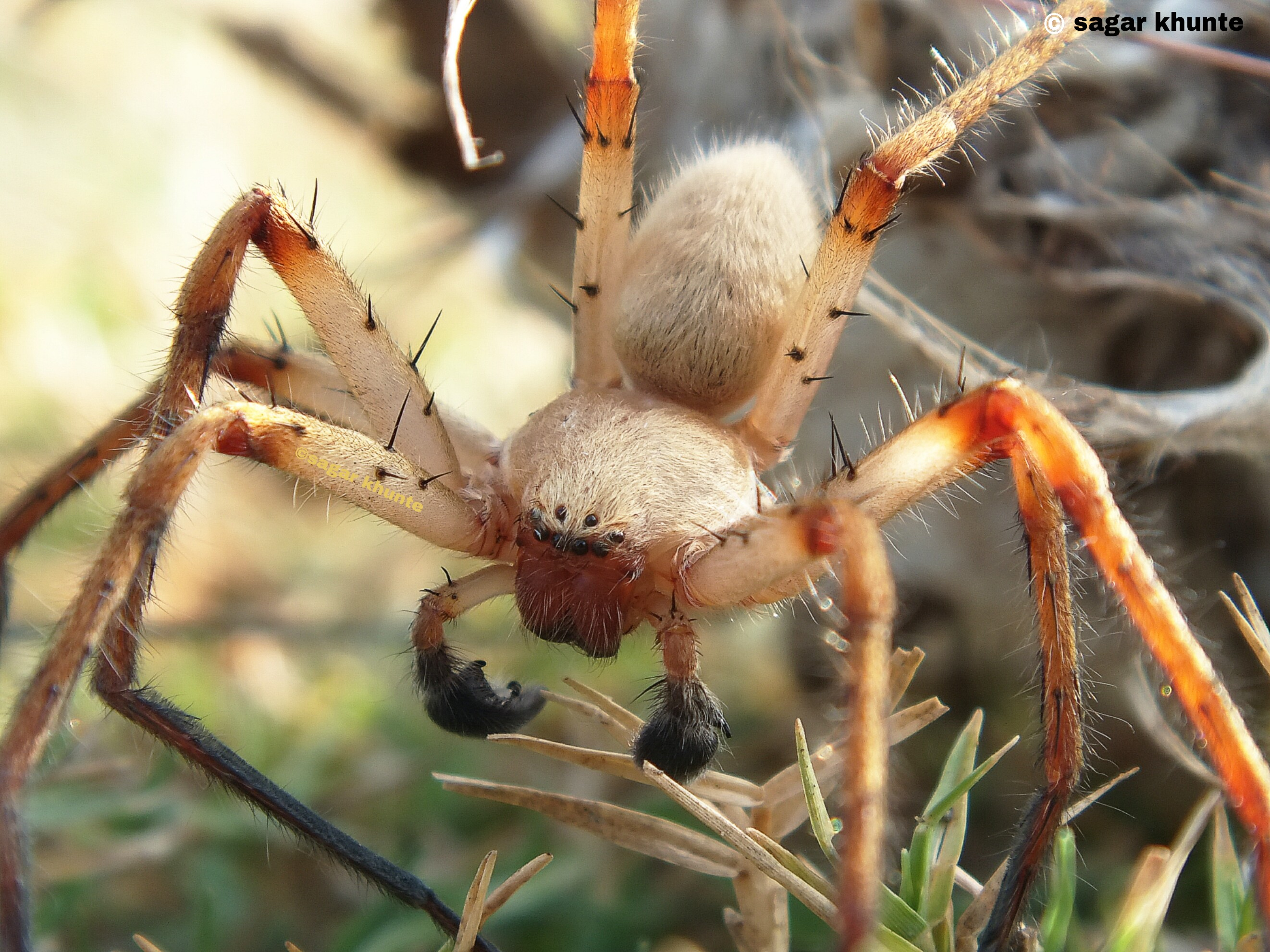
- Olios lamarcki
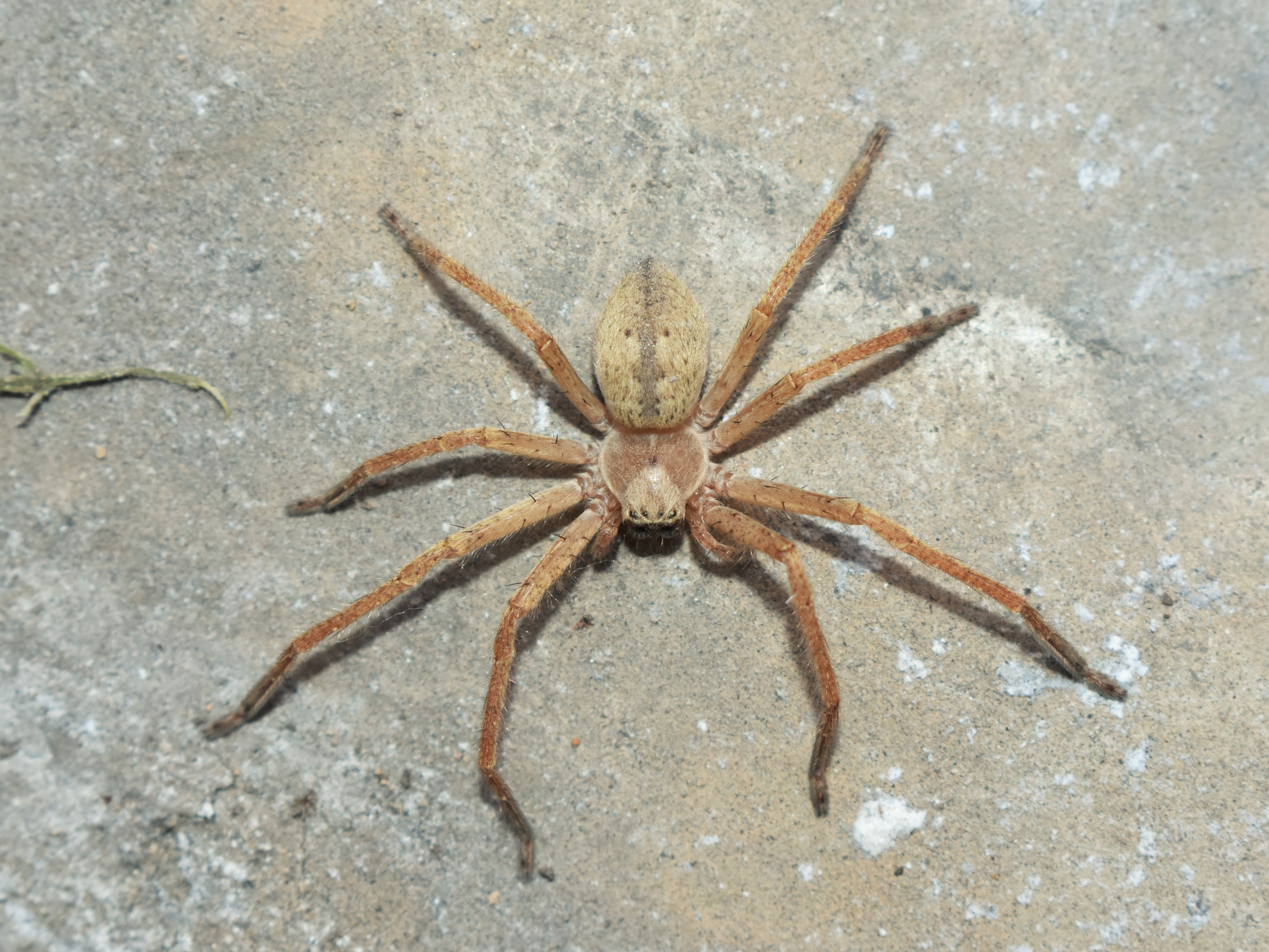
- Olios sericeus

Scientific classification
- Kingdom: Animalia
- Phylum: Arthropoda
- Subphylum: Chelicerata
- Class: Arachnida
- Order: Araneae
- Infraorder: Araneomorphae
- Family: Sparassidae
- Genus: Olios; Walckenaer, 1837

Type species
- Olios argelasius Walckenaer, 1805

Species
- 165, see text.

Synonyms
- Midamus Simon, 1880; Nisueta Simon, 1880; Nonianus Simon, 1885; Pelmopoda Karsch, 1879

= Olios =

Genus of spiders

Olios is the largest genus of huntsman spiders, containing 165 species. They are found throughout the world, with most species occurring in hot countries. The genus was first described by Charles Athanase Walckenaer in 1837.

== Description ==
They are small to large Sparassidae, that have eight eyes in two partially straight rows. For the smaller species of this genus, they are usually light brown to brown with darker areas. Most larger species are darker, and some members of this genus may also be green. They are nocturnal hunters.

== Venom ==
Like most spiders, members of the genus Olios are not considered dangerous to humans. While they do possess venom, it is primarily used to subdue its prey, which consists of insects. The venom is not potent enough to cause significant harm to humans, and bites may result in mild symptoms such as redness, swelling, or pain, similar to a bee sting.

== Habitat ==
As this genus is widespread, they are found in a large variety of habitats, from savannahs to rainforest. They are mainly found in vegetation, and rarely houses. They are sometimes shipped alongside fruit, but this is not a common occurrence.

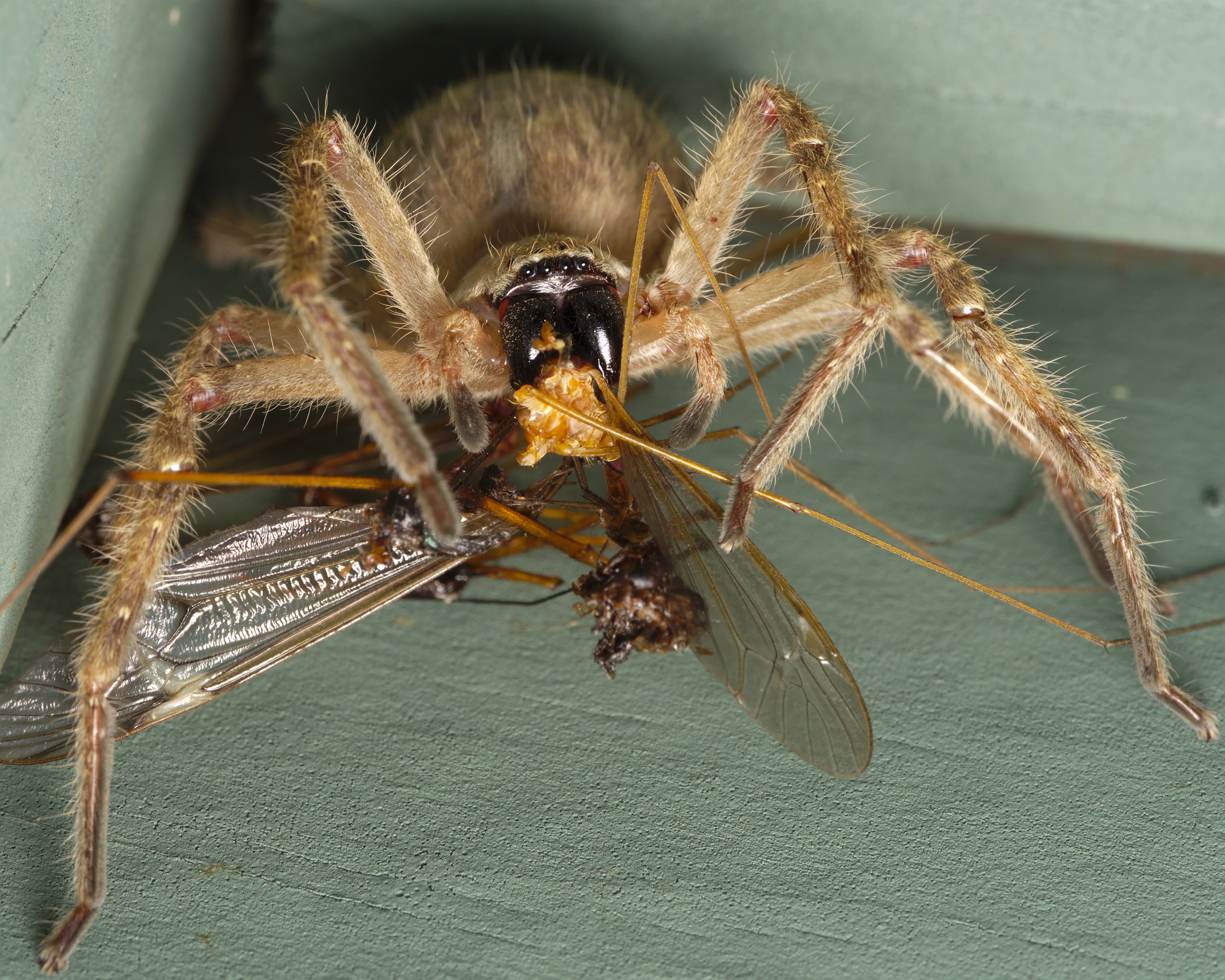
O. giganteus with prey

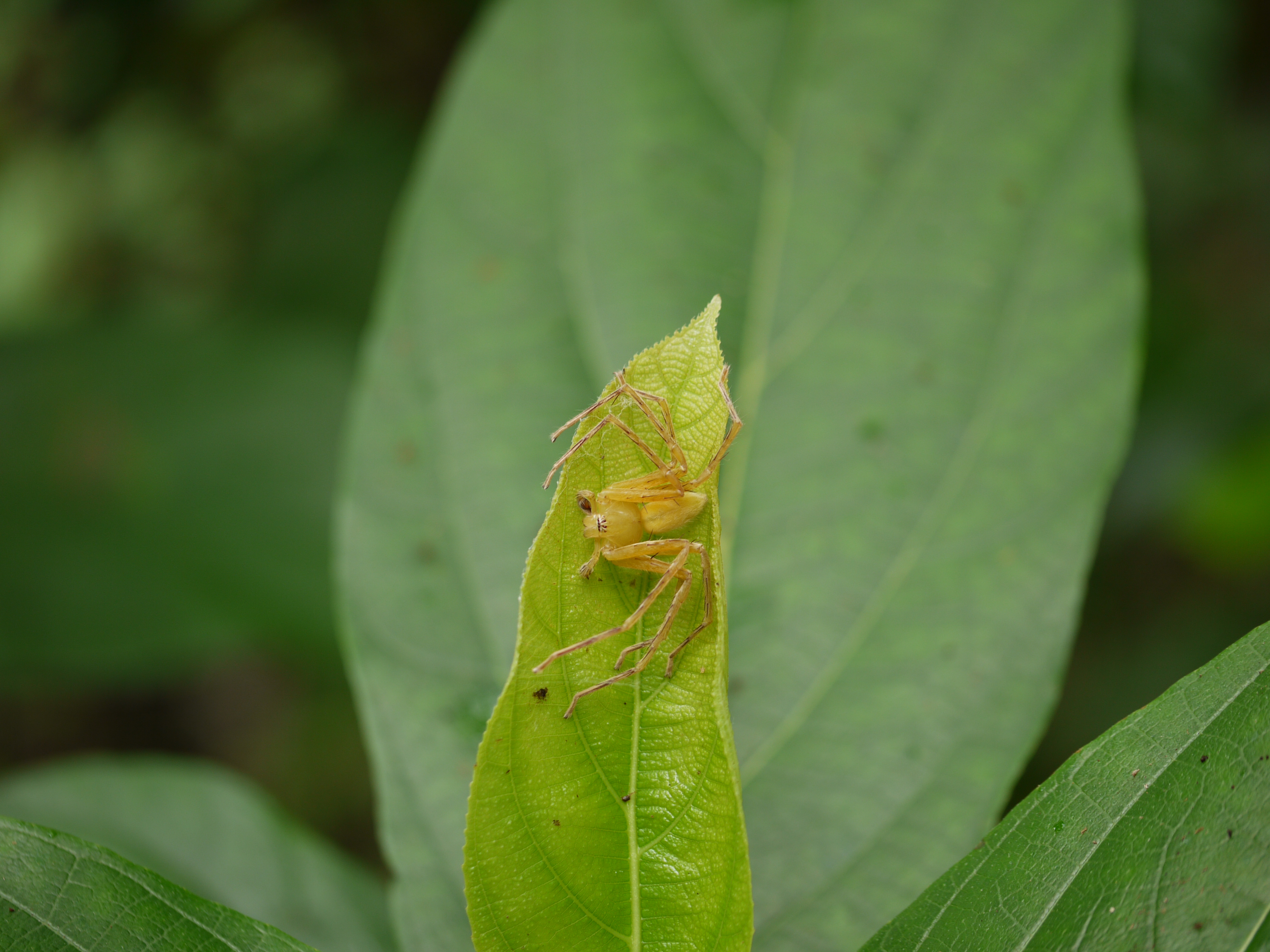
male Olios sp. on leaf

== Species ==
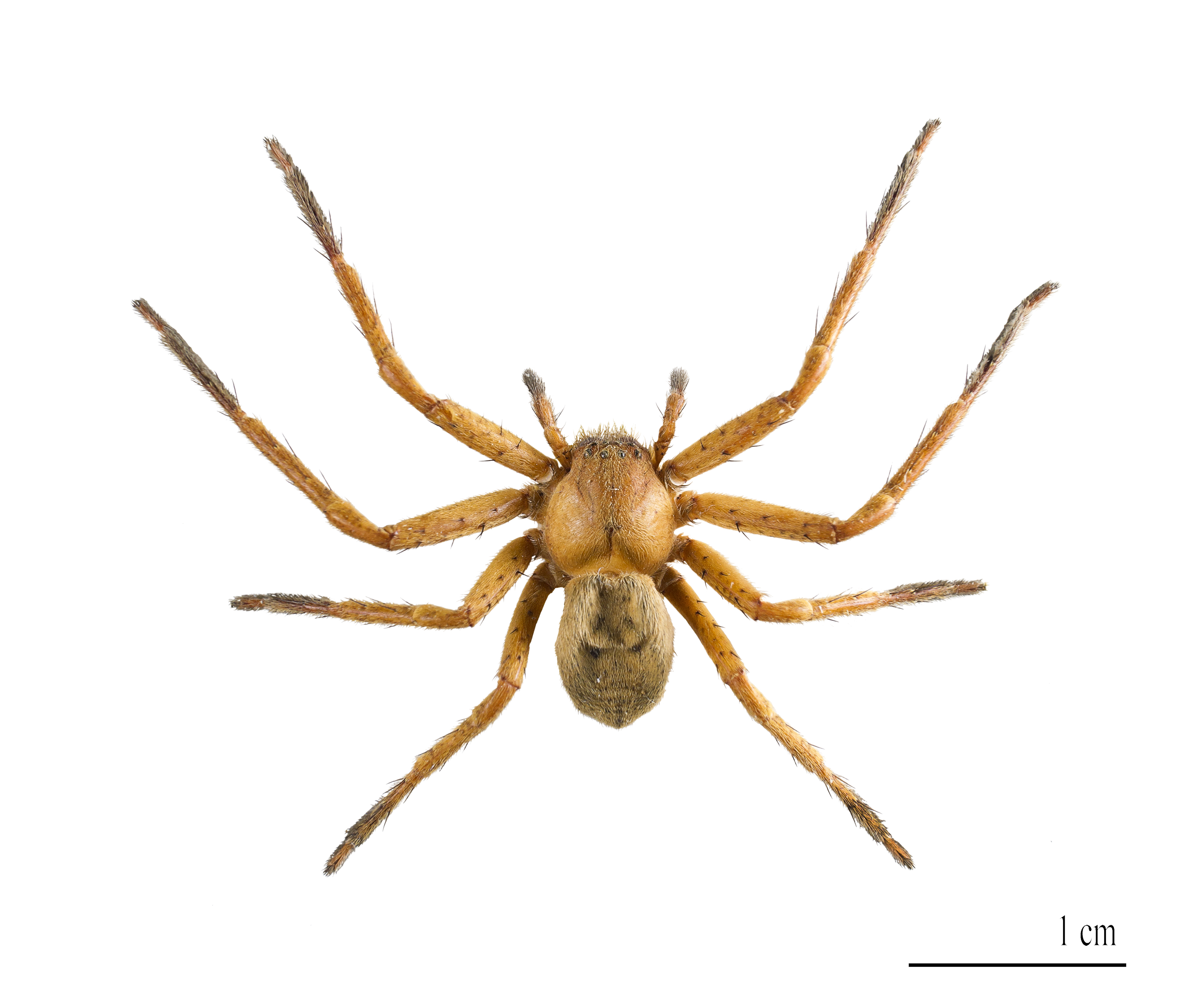
O. argelasius

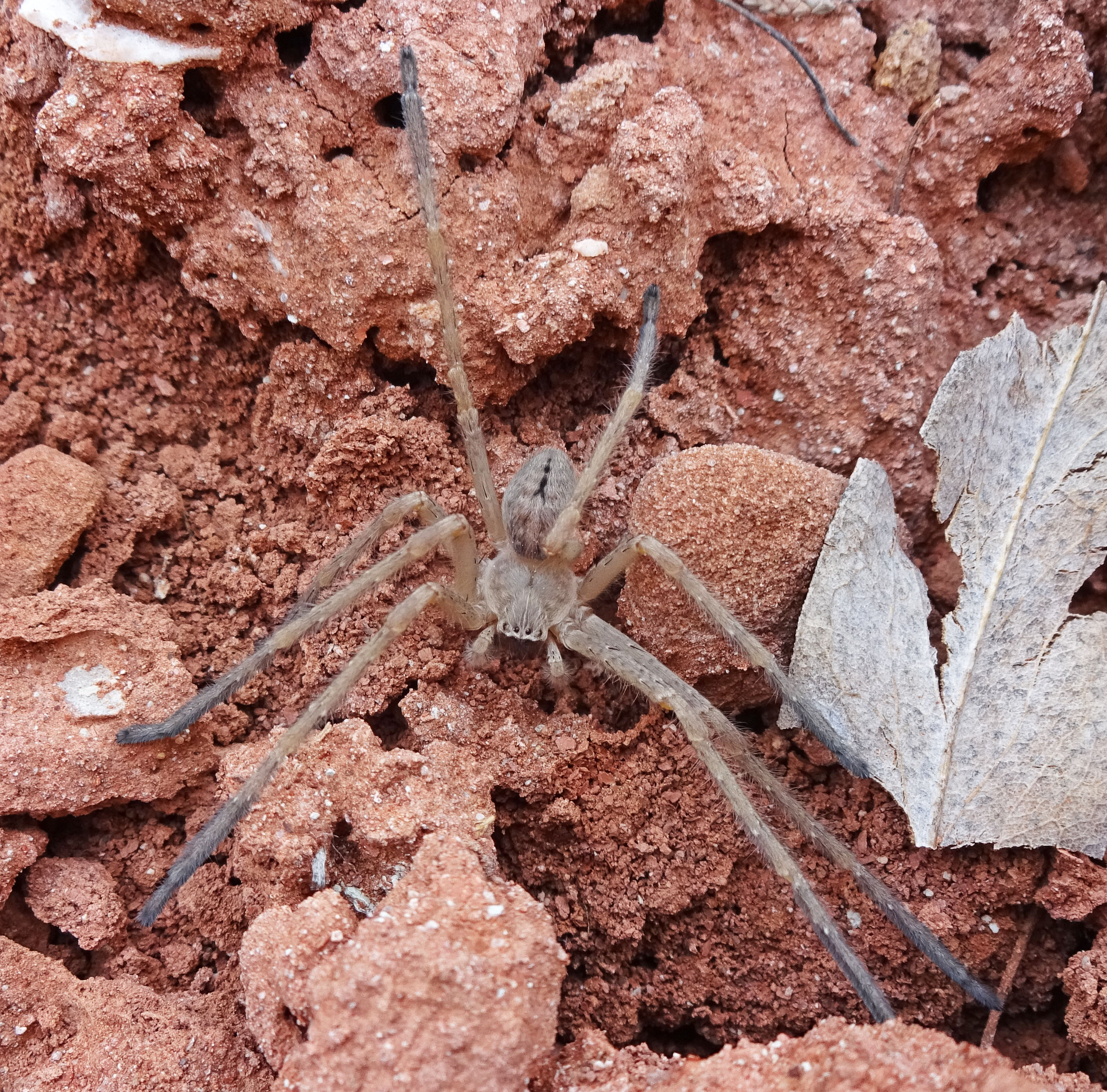
O. giganteus

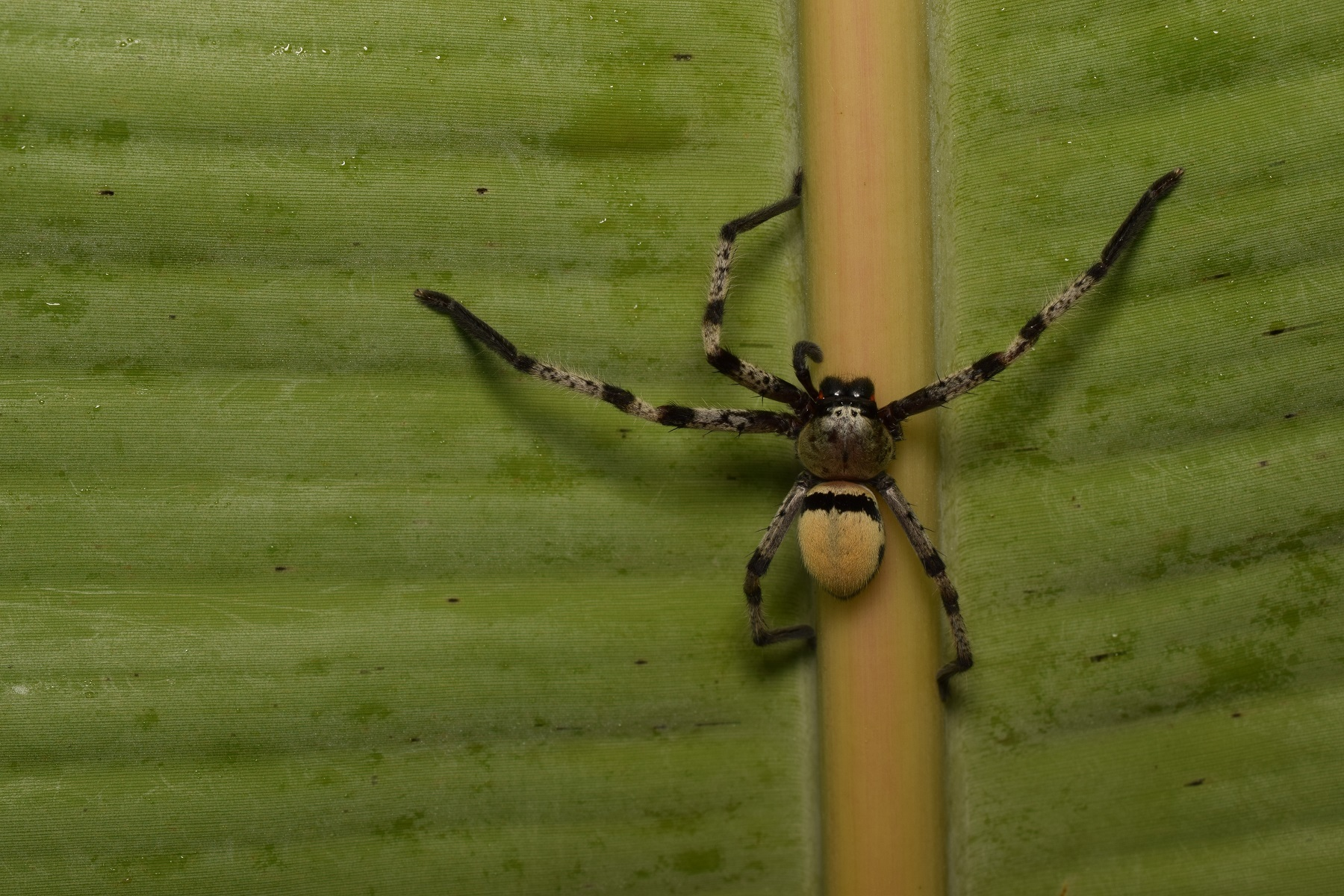
O. lamarcki

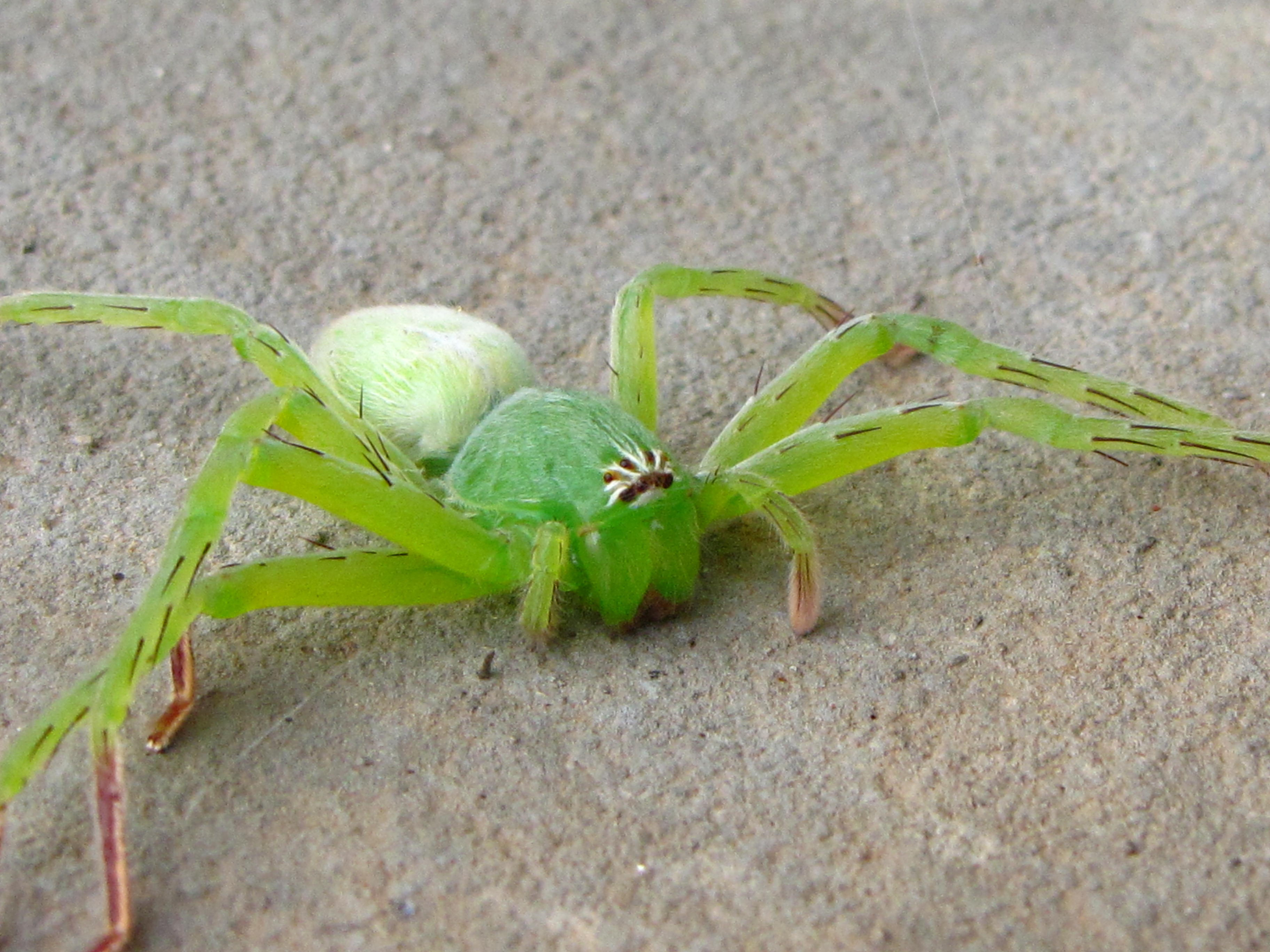
O. milleti

As of September 2025, this genus includes 165 species and five subspecies.

These species have articles on Wikipedia:

- Olios argelasius (Walckenaer, 1806) – Mediterranean. Introduced to Netherlands, Switzerland, Austria, Germany, Poland (type species)
- Olios auricomis (Simon, 1880) – Gambia, Cameroon, DR Congo, DR Congo, Ethiopia, Kenya, Tanzania, Rwanda, Angola, South Africa
- Olios biarmatus Lessert, 1925 – South Africa
- Olios brachycephalus Lawrence, 1938 – South Africa
- Olios chelifer Lawrence, 1937 – South Africa
- Olios chubbi Lessert, 1923 – Mozambique, South Africa
- Olios correvoni Lessert, 1921 – Tanzania
- Olios fasciculatus Simon, 1880 – Gabon, Guinea, Congo, DR Congo, South Sudan, Tanzania, South Africa
- Olios fonticola (Pocock, 1902) – South Africa
- Olios freyi Lessert, 1929 – DR Congo, South Africa
- Olios giganteus Keyserling, 1884 – United States, Mexico
- Olios greeni (Pocock, 1901) – Sri Lanka
- Olios hirtus (Karsch, 1879) – Sri Lanka
- Olios kruegeri (Simon, 1897) – South Africa
- Olios kunzi Jäger, 2020 – Namibia, South Africa, Zambia?
- Olios lacticolor Lawrence, 1952 – South Africa
- Olios lamarcki (Latreille, 1806) – Madagascar to India, Sri Lanka, Bangladesh
- Olios lepidus Vellard, 1924 – Brazil
- Olios machadoi Lawrence, 1952 – South Africa
- Olios marshalli (Pocock, 1898) – South Africa
- Olios milleti (Pocock, 1901) – India, Sri Lanka
- Olios senilis Simon, 1880 – India, Sri Lanka
- Olios sherwoodi Lessert, 1929 – DR Congo, Namibia, South Africa
- Olios sjostedti Lessert, 1921 – Tanzania, Botswana, South Africa
- Olios stictopus (Pocock, 1898) – South Africa
- Olios suavis (O. Pickard-Cambridge, 1876) – Cyprus, Israel, Egypt
- Olios zulu Simon, 1880 – South Africa

Complete species list as of September 2025
- Olios acolastus (Thorell, 1890) – Indonesia (Sumatra)
- Olios acostae Schenkel, 1953 – Venezuela
- Olios actaeon (Pocock, 1898) – Papua New Guinea (New Britain)
- Olios admiratus (Pocock, 1901) – India
- Olios alluaudi Simon, 1887 – Ivory Coast
- Olios angolensis Jäger, 2020 – Angola
- Olios argelasius (Walckenaer, 1806) – Mediterranean. Introduced to Netherlands, Switzerland, Austria, Germany, Poland (type species)
- Olios artemis Hogg, 1916 – New Guinea
- Olios atomarius Simon, 1880 – Peru
- Olios attractus Petrunkevitch, 1911 – Brazil
- Olios aurantiacus Mello-Leitão, 1918 – Brazil
- Olios auricomis (Simon, 1880) – Gambia, Cameroon, DR Congo, DR Congo, Ethiopia, Kenya, Tanzania, Rwanda, Angola, South Africa
- Olios batesi (Pocock, 1900) – Cameroon
- Olios baulnyi (Simon, 1874) – Morocco, Senegal, Sudan
- Olios benitensis (Pocock, 1900) – Cameroon
- Olios berlandi Roewer, 1951 – New Caledonia
- Olios bhattacharjeei (Saha & Raychaudhuri, 2007) – India
- Olios bhavnagarensis Sethi & Tikader, 1988 – India
- Olios biarmatus Lessert, 1925 – South Africa
- Olios biprocessus Hu, Zhang & Liu, 2025 – China
- Olios brachycephalus Lawrence, 1938 – South Africa
- Olios bungarensis Strand, 1913 – Indonesia (Sumatra)
- Olios canalae Berland, 1924 – New Caledonia
- Olios canariensis (Lucas, 1838) – Canary Islands
- Olios caprinus Mello-Leitão, 1918 – Brazil
- Olios chelifer Lawrence, 1937 – South Africa
- Olios chubbi Lessert, 1923 – Mozambique, South Africa
- Olios clarus (Keyserling, 1880) – Mexico
- Olios claviger (Pocock, 1901) – Zimbabwe
- Olios coccineiventris (Simon, 1880) – Indonesia (Moluccas), New Guinea
- Olios coenobita Fage, 1926 – Madagascar
- Olios correvoni Lessert, 1921 – Tanzania
  - O. c. choupangensis Lessert, 1936 – Mozambique
  - O. c. nigrifrons Lawrence, 1928 – Namibia, Botswana, South Africa, Eswatini
- Olios crassus (Banks, 1909) – Costa Rica
- Olios croseiceps (Pocock, 1898) – Malawi
- Olios darlingi (Pocock, 1901) – Zimbabwe
- Olios debalae (Biswas & Roy, 2005) – India
- Olios debilipes Mello-Leitão, 1945 – Argentina
- Olios denticulus Jäger, 2020 – Indonesia (Java)
- Olios diao Jäger, 2012 – Laos, Cambodia
- Olios digitatus Sun, Li & Zhang, 2011 – China
- Olios discolorichelis Caporiacco, 1947 – Guyana
- Olios durlaviae Biswas & Raychaudhuri, 2005 – Bangladesh
- Olios erraticus Fage, 1926 – Madagascar
- Olios erroneus O. Pickard-Cambridge, 1890 – Mexico, Guatemala, Venezuela?
- Olios extensus Berland, 1924 – New Caledonia
- Olios faesi Lessert, 1933 – Angola
- Olios fasciculatus Simon, 1880 – Gabon, Guinea, Congo, DR Congo, South Sudan, Tanzania, South Africa
- Olios fasciiventris Simon, 1880 – Tanzania (Zanzibar)
- Olios feldmanni Strand, 1915 – Cameroon
- Olios ferox (Thorell, 1892) – Indonesia, Australia
- Olios fimbriatus Chrysanthus, 1965 – Indonesia (Java, New Guinea)
- Olios flavens Nicolet, 1849 – Chile
- Olios floweri Lessert, 1921 – Ethiopia, East Africa
- Olios fonticola (Pocock, 1902) – South Africa
- Olios francoisi (Simon, 1898) – New Caledonia (Loyalty Is.)
- Olios freyi Lessert, 1929 – DR Congo, South Africa
- Olios fulvithorax Berland, 1924 – New Caledonia
- Olios galapagoensis Banks, 1902 – Galapagos
- Olios gambiensis Jäger, 2020 – Gambia
- Olios gaujoni (Simon, 1897) – Ecuador
- Olios gentilis (Karsch, 1879) – West Africa
- Olios giganteus Keyserling, 1884 – United States, Mexico
- Olios gravelyi Sethi & Tikader, 1988 – India
- Olios greeni (Pocock, 1901) – Sri Lanka
- Olios hampsoni (Pocock, 1901) – India
- Olios hirtus (Karsch, 1879) – Sri Lanka
- Olios hoplites Caporiacco, 1941 – Ethiopia
- Olios humboldtianus Berland, 1924 – New Caledonia
- Olios igraya (Barrion & Litsinger, 1995) – Philippines (Luzon)
- Olios inaequipes (Simon, 1890) – Indonesia (Flores)
- Olios insignifer Chrysanthus, 1965 – New Guinea
- Olios insulanus (Thorell, 1881) – Indonesia (Kei Is.)
- Olios ishikawatodaorum Arakawa, Kato & Tanikawa, 2025 – Japan
- Olios jaenicke Jäger, 2012 – Laos
- Olios jaldaparaensis Saha & Raychaudhuri, 2007 – India
- Olios japonicus Jäger & Ono, 2000 – Japan (Ryukyu Is.)
- Olios kassenjicola Strand, 1916 – Central Africa
- Olios kiranae Sethi & Tikader, 1988 – India
- Olios kolosvaryi (Caporiacco, 1947) – Ethiopia
- Olios kruegeri (Simon, 1897) – South Africa
- Olios kunzi Jäger, 2020 – Namibia, South Africa, Zambia?
- Olios lacticolor Lawrence, 1952 – South Africa
- Olios lamarcki (Latreille, 1806) – Madagascar, India, Sri Lanka, Bangladesh
- Olios lepidus Vellard, 1924 – Brazil
- Olios lincangensis Hu, Zhang & Liu, 2025 – China
- Olios longipedatus Roewer, 1951 – Brazil
- Olios longipes (Simon, 1884) – Sudan
- Olios lucieni Jäger, 2020 – Ethiopia, Kenya
- Olios lutescens (Thorell, 1894) – Pakistan, Myanmar, Indonesia (Sumatra, Java)
- Olios machadoi Lawrence, 1952 – South Africa
- Olios macroepigynus Soares, 1944 – Brazil
- Olios maculatus (Blackwall, 1862) – Brazil, Caribbean?
- Olios mahabangkawitus Barrion & Litsinger, 1995 – Philippines
- Olios marshalli (Pocock, 1898) – South Africa
- Olios menghaiensis (Wang & Zhang, 1990) – China, Laos
- Olios milleti (Pocock, 1901) – India, Sri Lanka
- Olios minensis (Mello-Leitão, 1917) – Brazil
- Olios monticola Berland, 1924 – New Caledonia
- Olios mordax (O. Pickard-Cambridge, 1899) – Madagascar
- Olios muang Jäger & Praxaysombath, 2009 – Laos
- Olios mutabilis Mello-Leitão, 1917 – Brazil
- Olios mygalinus Doleschall, 1857 – Indonesia (Moluccas), New Guinea
  - O. m. cinctipes Merian, 1911 – Indonesia (Sulawesi)
  - O. m. nigripalpis Merian, 1911 – Indonesia (Sulawesi)
- Olios nanningensis (Hu & Ru, 1988) – China
- Olios nentwigi Jäger, 2020 – Indonesia (Krakatau Is.)
- Olios neocaledonicus Berland, 1924 – New Caledonia
- Olios nigrifrons (Simon, 1897) – Indonesia (Java)
- Olios nigriventris Taczanowski, 1872 – French Guiana
- Olios oberzelleri Kritscher, 1966 – New Caledonia
- Olios obesulus (Pocock, 1901) – India
- Olios obscurus (Keyserling, 1880) – Mexico, Costa Rica, Panama
- Olios obtusus (F. O. Pickard-Cambridge, 1900) – Guatemala
- Olios oubatchensis Berland, 1924 – New Caledonia
- Olios paraensis (Keyserling, 1880) – Brazil
- Olios pellucidus (Keyserling, 1880) – Peru
- Olios perezi Barrion & Litsinger, 1995 – Philippines
- Olios peruvianus Roewer, 1951 – Peru
- Olios pictus (Simon, 1885) – Morocco, Algeria, Tunisia, Israel, Saudi Arabia
- Olios plumipes Mello-Leitão, 1937 – Brazil
- Olios princeps Hogg, 1914 – New Guinea
- Olios pulchripes (Thorell, 1899) – Cameroon
- Olios punctipes Simon, 1884 – Pakistan, India, Indonesia (Sumatra)
  - O. p. sordidatus (Thorell, 1895) – Myanmar
- Olios punjabensis Dyal, 1935 – Pakistan
- Olios pusillus Simon, 1880 – Madagascar
- Olios pyrozonis (Pocock, 1901) – India
- Olios quadrispilotus (Simon, 1880) – Tanzania (Zanzibar)
- Olios roeweri Caporiacco, 1955 – Guyana
- Olios rossettii (Leardi, 1901) – Pakistan, India, Nepal
- Olios rotundiceps (Pocock, 1901) – India
- Olios rubripes Taczanowski, 1872 – French Guiana
- Olios rubriventris (Thorell, 1881) – Indonesia (Moluccas), New Guinea
- Olios ruwenzoricus Strand, 1913 – Central Africa
- Olios scalptor Jäger & Ono, 2001 – Taiwan
- Olios senilis Simon, 1880 – India, Sri Lanka
- Olios sericeus (Kroneberg, 1875) – Ukraine, Caucasus, Iran, Kazakhstan, Central Asia, Afghanistan, China
- Olios sherwoodi Lessert, 1929 – DR Congo, Namibia, South Africa
- Olios similis (O. Pickard-Cambridge, 1890) – Guatemala
- Olios simoni (O. Pickard-Cambridge, 1890) – Guatemala
- Olios sjostedti Lessert, 1921 – Tanzania, Botswana, South Africa
- Olios skwarrae (Roewer, 1933) – Mexico
- Olios somalicus Caporiacco, 1940 – Somalia
- Olios spinipalpis (Pocock, 1901) – Zimbabwe
- Olios stictopus (Pocock, 1898) – South Africa
- Olios stimulator (Simon, 1897) – United Arab Emirates, Iraq, Afghanistan, Pakistan, India, Iran?
- Olios strandi Kolosváry, 1934 – New Guinea
- Olios suavis (O. Pickard-Cambridge, 1876) – Cyprus, Israel, Egypt
- Olios subadultus Mello-Leitão, 1930 – Brazil
- Olios sulphuratus (Thorell, 1899) – Cameroon
- Olios sungaya (Barrion & Litsinger, 1995) – Philippines (Mindanao)
- Olios suung Jäger, 2012 – China, Laos
- Olios sylvaticus (Blackwall, 1862) – Brazil
- Olios tamerlani Roewer, 1951 – New Guinea
- Olios taprobanicus Strand, 1913 – Sri Lanka
- Olios tarandus (Simon, 1897) – Pakistan
- Olios tener (Thorell, 1891) – Pakistan, India, Myanmar
- Olios tiantongensis (Zhang & Kim, 1996) – China
- Olios tigrinus (Keyserling, 1880) – Peru
- Olios tikaderi Kundu, Biswas & Raychaudhuri, 1999 – India
- Olios triarmatus Lessert, 1936 – Mozambique
- Olios trifurcatus (Pocock, 1900) – Cameroon
- Olios uniprocessus Hu, Zhang & Liu, 2025 – China
- Olios ventrosus Nicolet, 1849 – Chile
- Olios vitiosus Vellard, 1924 – Brazil
- Olios wroughtoni (Simon, 1897) – India
- Olios yucatanus Chamberlin, 1925 – Mexico
- Olios zulu Simon, 1880 – South Africa
