= Olios tikaderi =

Scientific classification
- Kingdom: Animalia
- Phylum: Arthropoda
- Subphylum: Chelicerata
- Class: Arachnida
- Order: Araneae
- Infraorder: Araneomorphae
- Family: Sparassidae
- Genus: Olios
- Species: O. tikaderi

Binomial name
- Olios tikaderi Kundu, Biswas & Raychaudhuri, 1999

Species of spider

Olios tikaderi is a species of spider in the family Sparassidae. It is native to India.
