= Olios stictopus =

Durban Olios Huntsman Spider

Scientific classification
- Kingdom: Animalia
- Phylum: Arthropoda
- Subphylum: Chelicerata
- Class: Arachnida
- Order: Araneae
- Infraorder: Araneomorphae
- Family: Sparassidae
- Genus: Olios
- Species: O. stictopus

Binomial name
- Olios stictopus (Pocock, 1898)

Synonyms
- Sparassus (Vindullus) stictopus Pocock, 1898

Species of spider

Olios stictopus is a species of spider in the family Sparassidae. It is endemic to South Africa and is commonly known as the Durban Olios huntsman spider.

== Distribution ==
Olios stictopus is known only from Durban in KwaZulu-Natal at an altitude of 17 m above sea level.

== Habitat and ecology ==
The species is a plant dweller that has been sampled from the Indian Ocean Coastal Belt biome.

== Conservation ==
Olios stictopus is listed as data deficient for taxonomic reasons. The species is known only from the type locality and the status of the species remains obscure. More sampling is needed to collect the female and to determine the species' range.

== Taxonomy ==
Olios stictopus was originally described by Pocock in 1898 as Sparassus (Vindullus) stictopus from specimens collected in Durban. The species is known only from male specimens. According to Dippenaar (2022), this species is misplaced in Olios.
