= Olios senilis =

Scientific classification
- Kingdom: Animalia
- Phylum: Arthropoda
- Subphylum: Chelicerata
- Class: Arachnida
- Order: Araneae
- Infraorder: Araneomorphae
- Family: Sparassidae
- Genus: Olios
- Species: O. senilis

Binomial name
- Olios senilis Simon, 1880

Species of spider

Olios senilis, is a species of spider of the genus Olios. It is native to India and Sri Lanka.
