= Olios zulu =

Zulu Olios Huntsman Spider

Scientific classification
- Kingdom: Animalia
- Phylum: Arthropoda
- Subphylum: Chelicerata
- Class: Arachnida
- Order: Araneae
- Infraorder: Araneomorphae
- Family: Sparassidae
- Genus: Olios
- Species: O. zulu

Binomial name
- Olios zulu Simon, 1880

Species of spider

Olios zulu is a species of spider in the family Sparassidae. It is endemic to South Africa and is commonly known as the Zulu Olios huntsman spider.

== Distribution ==
Olios zulu is known only from an unspecified site in Zululand, KwaZulu-Natal.

== Habitat and ecology ==
The species is a plant dweller that has been sampled from the Savanna biome.

== Conservation ==
Olios zulu is listed as data deficient for unknown provenance and taxonomic reasons. The species is known only from a single unspecified site and the status of the species remains obscure. More sampling is needed to collect the male and to determine the species' range.

== Taxonomy ==
Olios zulu was described by Simon in 1880 with the type locality given only as Zululand. The species is known only from a female specimen and has not been illustrated.
