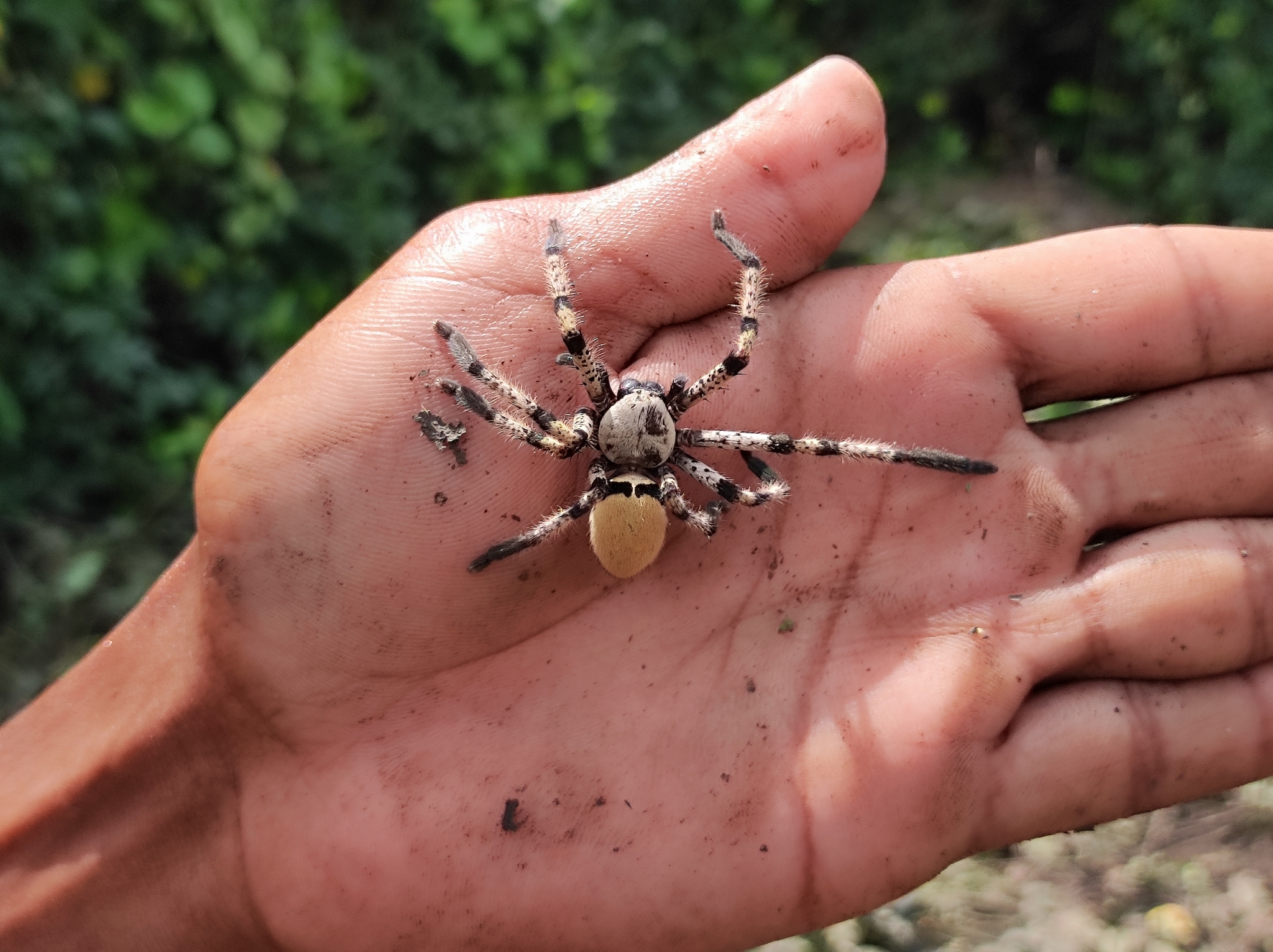
- From Thane, Maharashtra, India.

Scientific classification
- Kingdom: Animalia
- Phylum: Arthropoda
- Subphylum: Chelicerata
- Class: Arachnida
- Order: Araneae
- Infraorder: Araneomorphae
- Family: Sparassidae
- Genus: Olios
- Species: O. lamarcki

Binomial name
- Olios lamarcki (Latreille, 1806)

Subspecies
- Olios lamarcki taprobanicus Strand, 1913

= Olios lamarcki =

Species of spider

Olios lamarcki, is a species of spider of the genus Olios. It is found in Madagascar to Sri Lanka, India and Bangladesh. The subspecies O. lamarcki taprobanicus is endemic to Sri Lanka.

== Description ==
Olios lamarcki is characterized by males with a carapace length of approximately 6.73 mm and a width of 6.77 mm, while females have a carapace length of 8.82 mm and a width of 8.87 mm. Both sexes exhibit distinct coloration patterns, with males displaying brownish furrows on the carapace and females lacking a distinct pattern. The chelicerae of males have two anterior and four posterior teeth, while females have two anterior, five (right), and four (left) posterior teeth. Leg measurements follow a formula of 2143. Eye diameters and interdistances vary slightly between males and females. Overall, the species is characterized by its unique morphology and coloration patterns.
