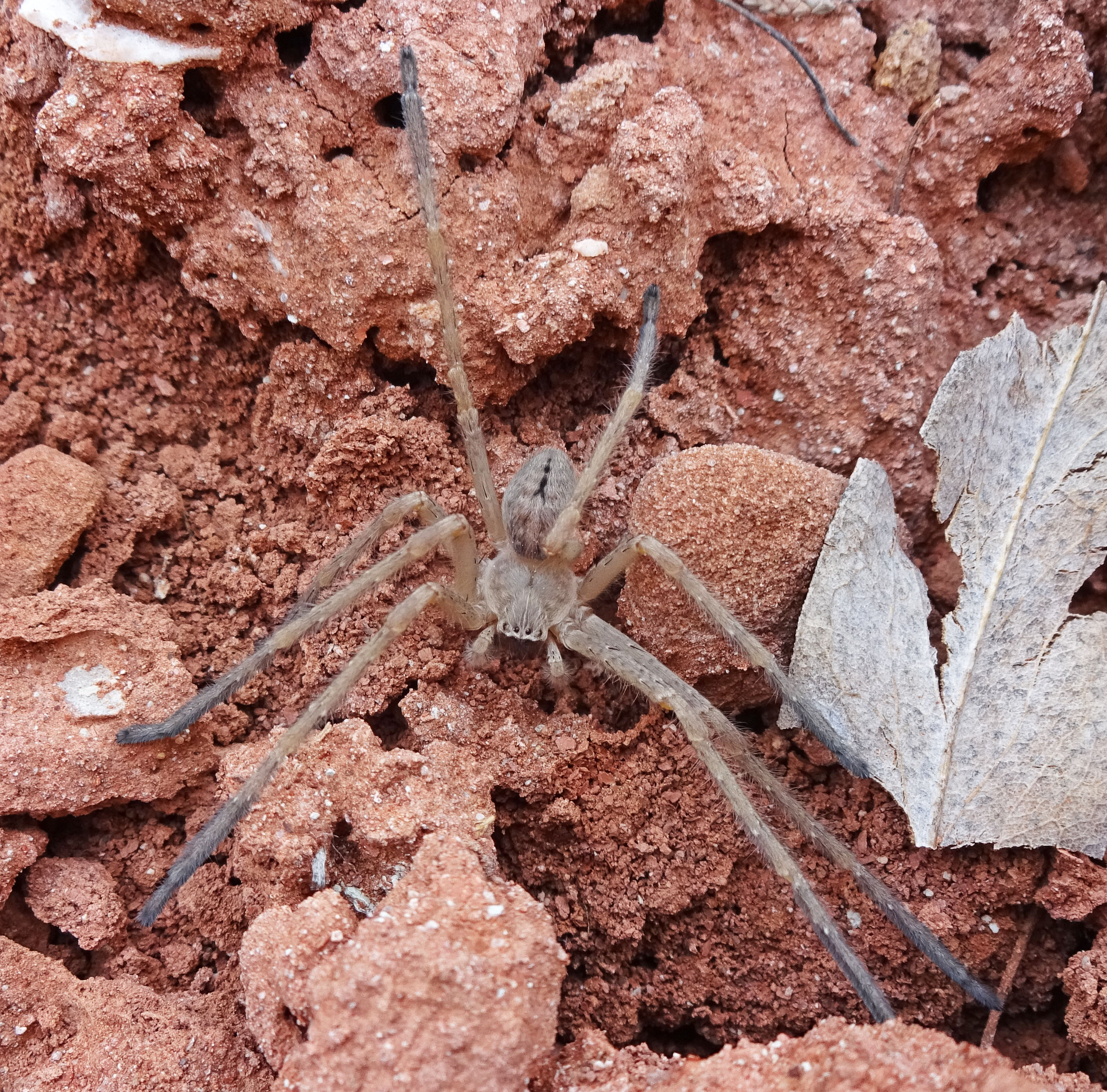

Scientific classification
- Kingdom: Animalia
- Phylum: Arthropoda
- Subphylum: Chelicerata
- Class: Arachnida
- Order: Araneae
- Infraorder: Araneomorphae
- Family: Sparassidae
- Genus: Olios
- Species: O. giganteus

Binomial name
- Olios giganteus Keyserling, 1884

= Olios giganteus =

Species of spider

Olios giganteus is a large species of huntsman spider in the family Sparassidae. It is found in the United States and Mexico. This species is harmless to humans.

== Characteristics ==
Olios giganteus are primarily coloured black, brown tan and orange. The spider has a crab-like appearance due to their legs being "laterigrade", at the base so as to be oriented in a horizontal plane rather than a vertical plane. The total leg span of Olios giganteus can be up to 3 inches.
