= Oxyopes lepidus =

Scientific classification
- Kingdom: Animalia
- Phylum: Arthropoda
- Subphylum: Chelicerata
- Class: Arachnida
- Order: Araneae
- Infraorder: Araneomorphae
- Family: Oxyopidae
- Genus: Oxyopes
- Species: O. lepidus

Binomial name
- Oxyopes lepidus (Blackwall, 1864)

Species of spider

Oxyopes lepidus is a species of lynx spider found in India.
