= Olios lepidus =

Scientific classification
- Kingdom: Animalia
- Phylum: Arthropoda
- Subphylum: Chelicerata
- Class: Arachnida
- Order: Araneae
- Infraorder: Araneomorphae
- Family: Sparassidae
- Genus: Olios
- Species: O. lepidus

Binomial name
- Olios lepidus Vellard, 1924

Species of spider

Olios lepidus is a species of huntsman spider, found in Brazil.
