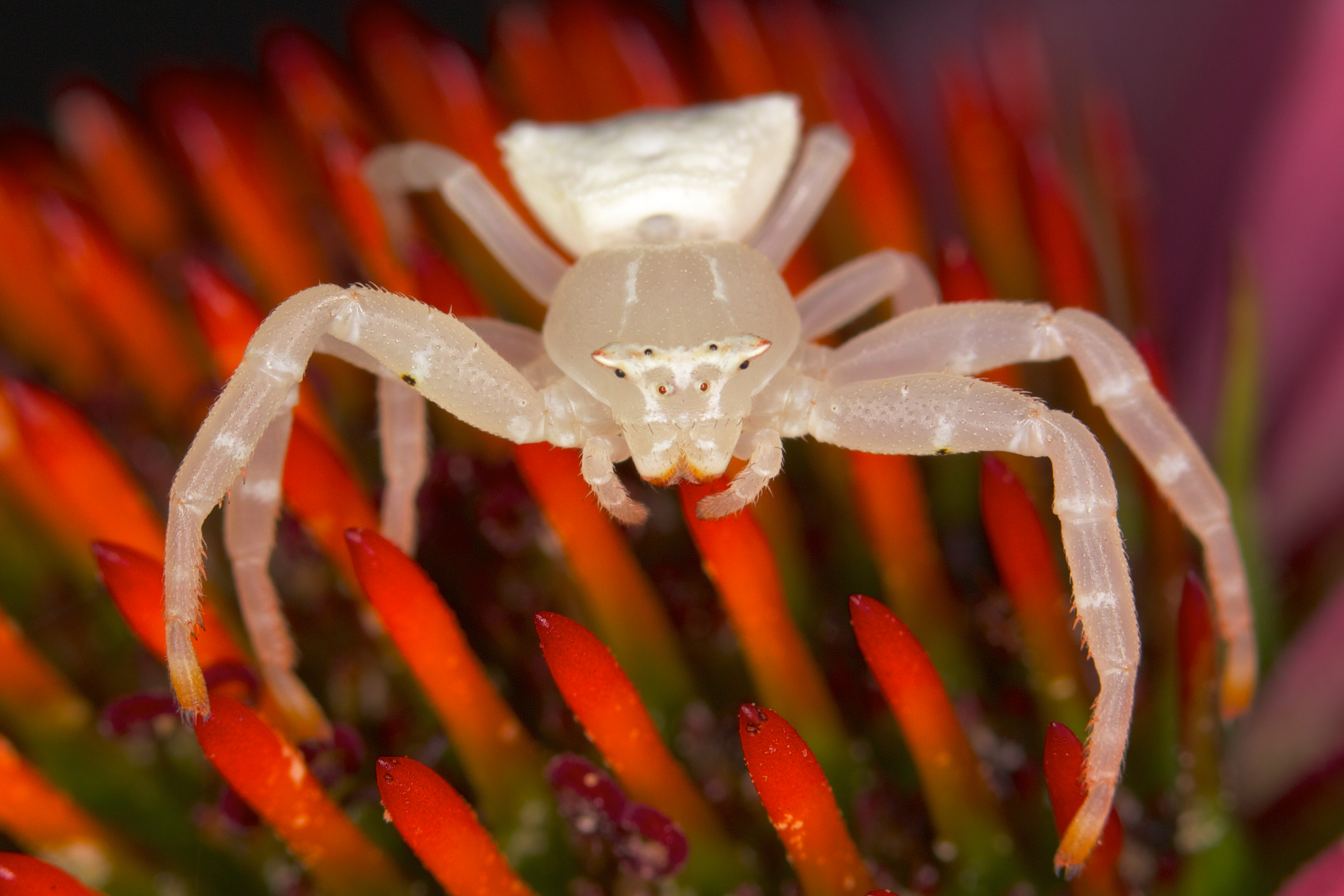

Scientific classification
- Kingdom: Animalia
- Phylum: Arthropoda
- Subphylum: Chelicerata
- Class: Arachnida
- Order: Araneae
- Infraorder: Araneomorphae
- Family: Thomisidae
- Genus: Thomisus
- Species: T. spectabilis

Binomial name
- Thomisus spectabilis Doleschall, 1859

= Thomisus spectabilis =

White crab spider

Species of spider

Thomisus spectabilis, also known as the white crab spider or Australian crab spider, is a small spider found in Australia and far east Asia.

The body length of the female is up to 10 mm, the male 6.2 mm. Including legs, the spider is around 3 cm across. This spider is usually white, though sometimes may appear yellow. The legs and head appear almost translucent. Thomisus spectabilis is an ambush predator, often seen resting in flowers of its same color. Its egg sacs are laid in a folded leaf, and the cream colored eggs, typically 1 mm in diameter, range between 200 and 370 in number.

These spiders primarily eat insects and their preference for symmetry helps them in capturing pollinating insects such as butterflies and bees. The spider also takes advantage of its color scheme's reflectance of UV light to create a color contrast in the visual field of the bees that attracts the bees.

The Australian crab spider is mostly a suburban or urban animal found in Eastern Australia, and their habitat is among white and yellow daisies.

Thomisus spectabilis are a venomous species. Their venom is not known to be medically significant. These spiders do not weave webs, but rather chase and ambush their prey.

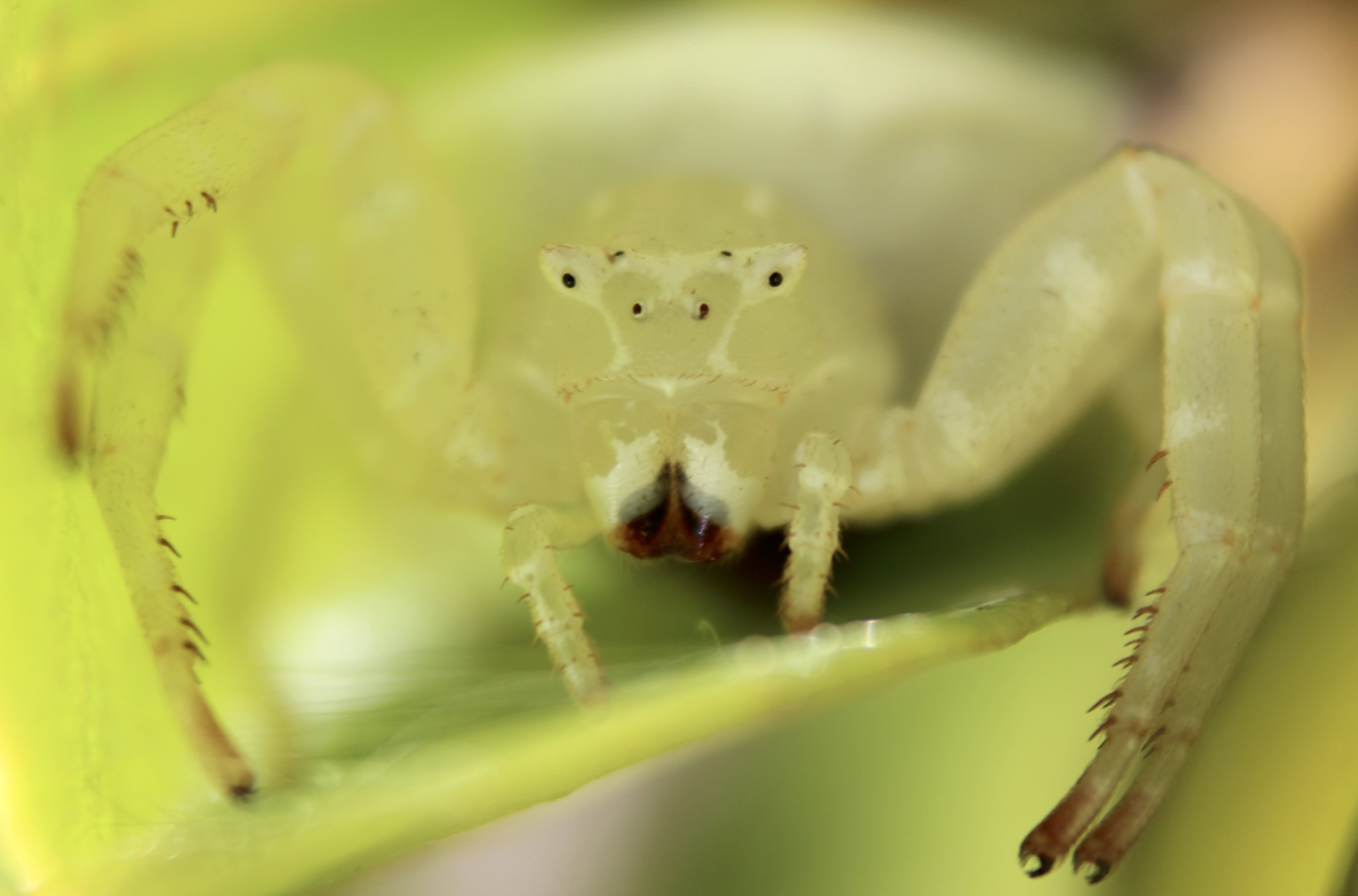
Adult white crab spider. Lateral eyes are larger than central eyes.

== Description ==
T. spectabilis undergo a unique color transformation from yellow to white. The color change helps them not only hide from predators, but stalk prey in similarly colored daisies as well. This transformation allows them to switch between appearing conspicuous and cryptic to their prey. The colorful bodies allow spiders to reflect UV-light in a manner that attracts bees to their flower. When the spider changes to a specific color, the color is displayed uniformly across its head, legs, and abdomen. The legs of this spider span up to 30 mm. They have small black eyes that are organized into a white band across the head resembling a mask. The abdomen of the spider has a pentagon shape and two small bumps across it. They have stout legs arranged similarly to a crab. The spider has pinching fangs, but no claw tufts, so it is not able to climb across smooth surfaces.

== Phylogeny ==
=== Closely related species ===
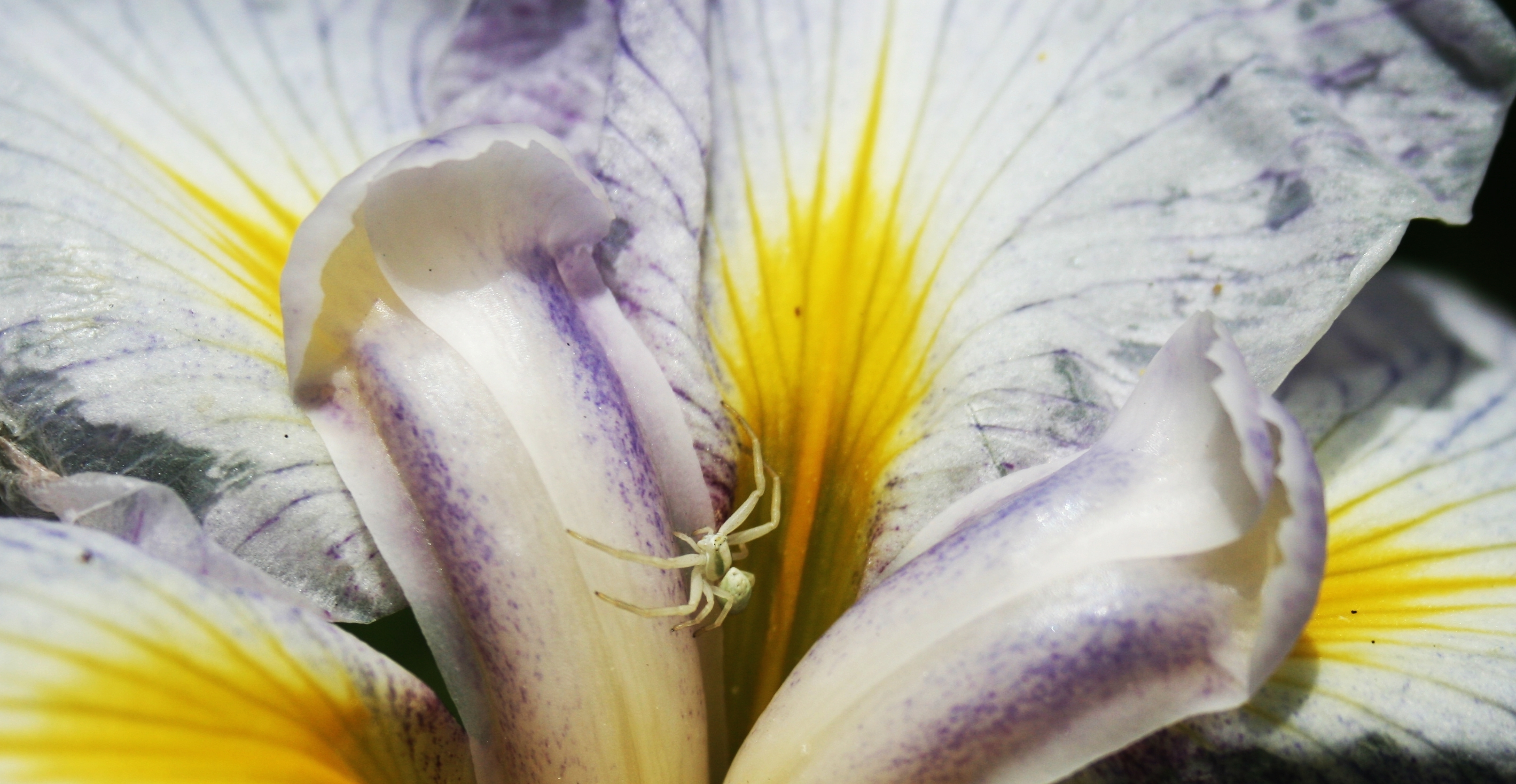
White crab spider waiting to ambush pollinator on plant

Australian crab spiders are very similar to other crab spiders across the world, such as the European, Alaskan, or Canadian crab spider. One similarity between these spiders is that rather than building webs, they hide from their prey and ambush them with their forelimbs.

Crab spiders are in the family Thomisidae. This family has four lineages/clades: Borboropactus clade, Epidius clade, Stephanopis clade and the Thomisus clade. The Australian crab spider belongs to the Thomisus clade. There is very minimal genetic divergence in this clade. The ability of Thomisus spectabilis to change color is shared by Misumena, Diaea, and Runcinia spiders which are also members of the Thomisidae family and have high genetic relatedness with the Australian Crab spider. Misumena vatia is a close relative of T. spectabilis but instead has a holarctic distribution. Thomisids fall within the larger Dionycha clade, and this clade is defined by the loss of an unpaired tarsal claw for the animal. Genetic sequencing of Thomisids found that the 16S gene was 430 nucleotide base pairs long, H3 gene was 328 base pairs, and COI gene was 557 base pairs. All of these basepair numbers are unique to the Thomisids within the Dionycha clade.

There are three distinct features that define a spider from the Thomisidae family: leg 3 and leg 4 are shorter and weaker than leg 1 and leg 2, lateral eyes that are larger than median eyes, and presence of a group of setae. The Thomisus clade of the Australian crab spider has the following morphological similarities: circular scopula hairs, subequal bulbus, disc shaped tegulum, a sperm duct with a spherical, peripheral course, no conductor, and no median apophysis.

== Habitat and distribution ==
=== Habitat ===
Australian crab spiders choose habitats that increase their chances of catching prey. Since this involves creating contrast between itself and the flower, it will pick flower colors and flower positions that maximize the contrast. Due to the importance of contrast with flowers, these spiders cannot simply choose habitats with large numbers of its prey. Instead, they must think about both flower type and prey number while choosing habitats in a way that maximizes capture. T. spectabilis is mostly attracted to staying in flowers that are newer, and is drawn to them through olfactory cues. It is most commonly found in tropical or subtropical areas, but some also prefer white clothing lines.

=== Geographic distribution ===
They are spread throughout Australia, but are primarily located in Eastern Australia. It is mainly a suburban spider. In Brisbane, they are normally found in backyards, bushes, and gardens.

== Diet ==
These spiders are a predatory species, and they feed mainly on insects. They mainly eat live or recently killed insects. Some examples of these insects are crickets, drosophila flies, and pollinators such as honey bees and butterflies. The spiders are an important form of pest control as they protect the flowers they inhabit from attack by insects. The energy obtained from consuming these insects allows the adult female Australian crab spider to produce a clutch of eggs.

== Webs ==
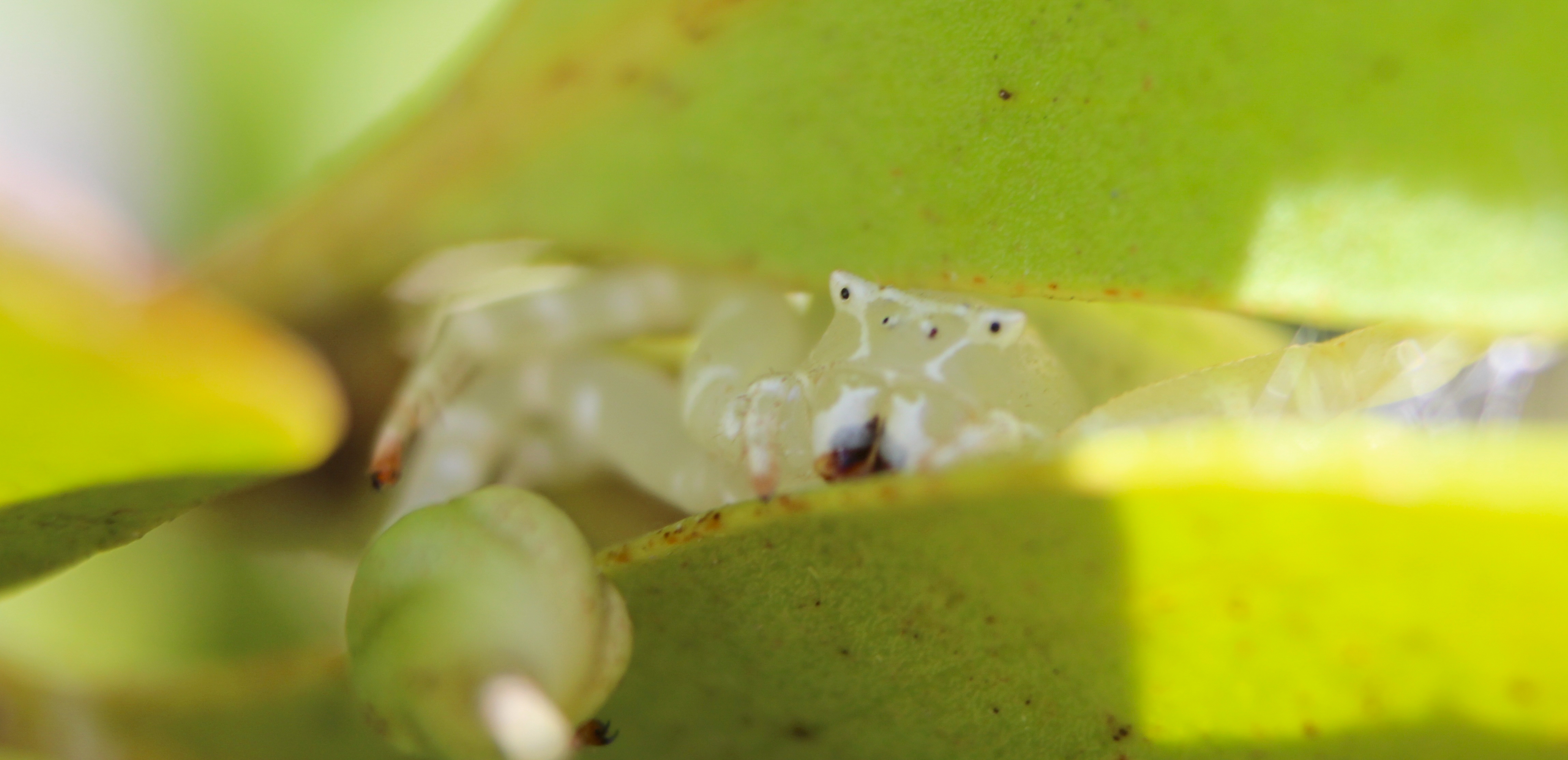
Thomisus spectabilis hiding under foliage.

Australian crab spiders do not build webs, as they capture their prey through ambush and hiding rather than web capture. They will use fallen leaves or live foliage to hide their bodies, which are easy to camouflage due to its color in order to ambush their prey. They can wait up to periods of 2 hours hidden under foliage in order to strike their prey. However, they do still have the ability to make silk, and typically use it to build retreats. During the day, they rest in these retreats that are composed of silk and leaves. At night, they come out of their retreats to wait on flowers and ambush their prey.

== Behavior ==
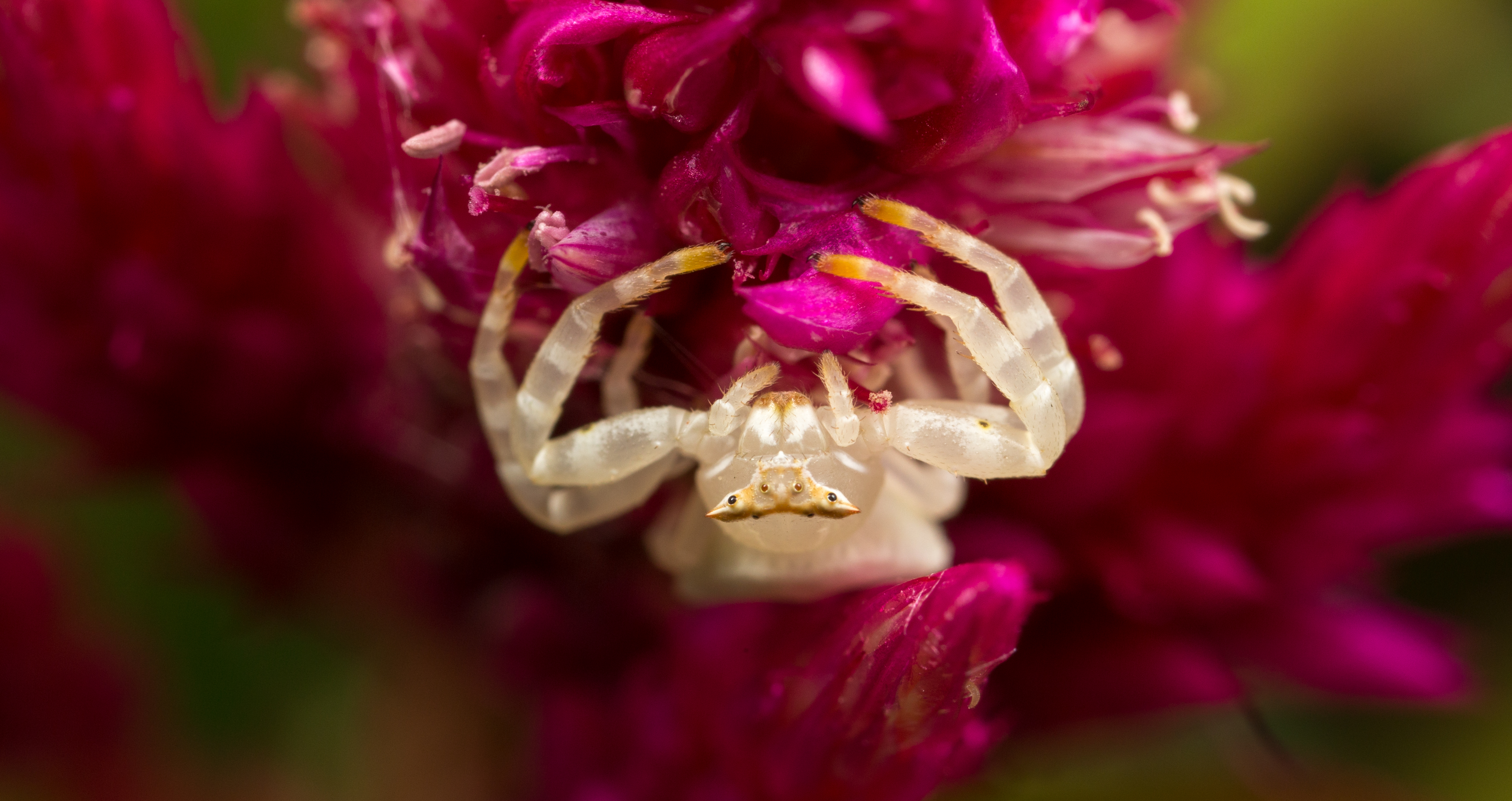
Spider hiding from bees by latching on to the surface underneath the flower

=== Prey capture ===
==== Cues ====
This is a spider that does not capture prey through webs, but instead sits on flowers and ambushes pollinators as they arrive to the flower. They use cues from their prey and from the flowers to pick their habitat. Although many spiders use camouflage to hide from spiders before eventually attacking them, the Australian crab spider is actually not cryptic to its prey as it hides. In fact, honeybees can visually determine the difference between the spiders and the flowers in which they are waiting. The mechanism of deceit for Australian crab spiders involves influencing and exploiting signal communication between pollinators and plants. Insects choose plants that have larger flowers, available nectar, a specific odor, a certain color, or a certain symmetrical pattern on the flower. Honeybees specifically are more attracted to flowers with certain odors (implying high nectar reward), colors, and symmetrical patterns. The Australian crab spider uses the same combination of visual and olfactory cues to attract bees towards the flower they are sitting on.

==== Symmetry affinity ====
The honeybee's affinity for symmetry leads it to pollinate flowers with symmetrical patterns. Bees and Australian crab spiders are both drawn to symmetry, and this leads both the predator and prey to come together at the same flowers. Coevolution of bees with the Australian crab spider has resulted in the spiders being attracted to the same cues as the bees. It has also resulted in the bees developing anti-predatory behaviour. Despite the heightened risk of going to the same flowers as the Australian crab spiders, they continue to do it because those flowers present the highest potential reward in nectar and freshness for the bees. Honeybees show a strong preference for radial symmetry over bilateral symmetry while crab spiders do not discriminate. The white crab spider's preference for symmetry, along with olfactory cues, draws it to hide among flowers and ambush honeybees as they arrive. The olfactory cues tell the honeybees which flowers hold the biggest rewards for them, and these spiders have evolved to be attracted to that same scent because the bees are the spiders' reward.

==== UV reflectance ====
The spiders are able to actively influence honeybees to come to the flower that they are positioned on. When the Australian crab spider is in its white body state, it is able to reflect UV light. This reflected UV light causes activation in the UV photoreceptors of the bees, and increases the UV receptor contrast and the contrast between the spiders and the flowers. The bees are attracted to this contrast, and subsequently go to the flowers at which they are ambushed by the spiders.

There is temporal and individual variation in UV reflectance between Australian Crab spiders. This variation is most frequently in the range of 300 nm to 400 nm. Temporal variation can be seen in differences in UV-reflectance between different years. In 2008, Thomisus spectabilis were more UV-reflective and created larger color contrasts with flowers than in 2009. This temporal variation is correlated with the spiders adopting strategies switching between low and high conspicuousness. This is necessitated by a combination of Thomisus spectabilis' prey and predator behaviour and the balance of attracting prey while maintaining safety from predators. The most common predators of the spider are wasps and birds, and both of these animals are able to perceive UV-light. Thus, the Australian Crab Spider is much more likely to be harmed in a white UV-bright reflective patterns than a white UV-dull reflective pattern.

Individual UV-reflectance variation is not necessarily due to the amount of prey they have already consumed, as their adjustment is based on prey availability and environment rather than satiation. It is also not due to the body size or shape of the spiders. Rather, it has the strongest relationship with predator presence. In the absence of predators, UV-Reflectance will always increase because it always makes them more likely to attract prey. This is in stark contrast to other spider species, such as Misumena vatia, that almost always vary their UV-reflectance to match their backgrounds and lower conspicuousness.

==== Mechanisms of color polyphenism ====
There is variation in the hypodermal layer of spiders with different body color phenotypes. For yellow body spiders, the hypodermis is composed of granules, filled with electrons, and does not contain crystals. White non-UV spiders have their hypodermal layer filled with random patterns of crystals. White UV spiders have granules and little to no crystals in their hypodermis. The most significant aspect of the variation is the lack of granules for white non-UV spiders. The crystals of the hypodermis fluoresce under UV light. The structure of the guanocyte layer does not show distinct patterns for different color phenotypes.

Thomisus spectabilis differs from other crab spiders in that its UV reflectance, hue, saturation, and brightness profiles are very different between its three phenotypes. There is a 56 nm shift in hue from the white UV spiders to the white non-UV spiders, and a .05 difference in saturation between white UV and white non-UV spiders. Brightness of white UV-Spiders was 7.9% higher than for white non-UV spiders. The cuticles of white UV and white non-UV spiders reflect UV light very similarly across the spectrum, but yellow non-UV spiders transmit less light throughout the spectrum, specifically in the 380-500 nm region. Similarly, the guanocytes of white non-UV and white UV spiders reflect UV light similarly, but yellow non-UV spiders reflected less throughout the spectrums as well. Guanocytes across all phenotypes sharply dropped off reflection at wavelengths under 330 nm.

==== Positioning ====
Another crucial aspect of prey capture for the Australian crab spider lies in its exact positioning on the flower itself. Honeybees are attracted to flowers partially based on the amount of rewards they have, and this is determined from looking at the center of the flower. To ensure they don't come in the way of that, it is vital for the spider to position itself on the lingulate floret of the flower away from the center. This allows them to create the color contrast in the bee's vision that draws them to the spider-laden flowers.

==== Effect of spider size and movement on prey behavior ====
Thomisus spectabilis with larger body sizes are better able to capture prey. Honeybees are more likely to land on flowers that have larger spiders than smaller spiders. Thus, larger Australian crab spiders do not have to use their UV-reflective property as much as smaller spiders to attract bees. For smaller spiders, using UV-reflectance results in less hunting success than larger spiders using UV-reflectance; spider size is a larger factor than UV-reflectance for predicting bee attraction and hunting success. Further, levels of UV-reflectance increase for larger spiders suggesting coevolution of size and UV-reflectance traits.

Movement of Thomisus spectabilis has large impacts on the behaviour of honeybees. If they move before honeybees approach, the bees are much more likely to stay away from the flower. This effect is more pronounced when the spiders are waiting below the inflorescence of the flower rather than above it. Below the inflorescence, the spiders remaining still makes them 70% more likely to attract a spider to land, but above the inflorescence they are 50% more likely to attract a spider to land by remaining still.

Movement of crab spiders alerts bees to their presence. This forces the bees to make a decision weighing the risk of the spiders and the reward of the nectar. These decisions are also influenced by the susceptibility of the bee. Highly susceptible bees mostly visit safe flowers, even if the resources are poor in those areas. Other bees often must choose riskier patches of flowers, because those flowers often contain the highest amount of nectar. Since the flowers with hiding spiders often become damaged due to the ambush of the bees, they actually have evolved to increase nectar production so that they can continue to attract bees despite the threat of predation. Honeybees are adept at finding the best flower patches to maximize nectar reward and minimize predation risk due to their impressive communication system. Bees are able to recruit bee mates to flower locations that they have scouted as high nectar locations, and they are also able to tell each other when there is a patch with hiding spiders.

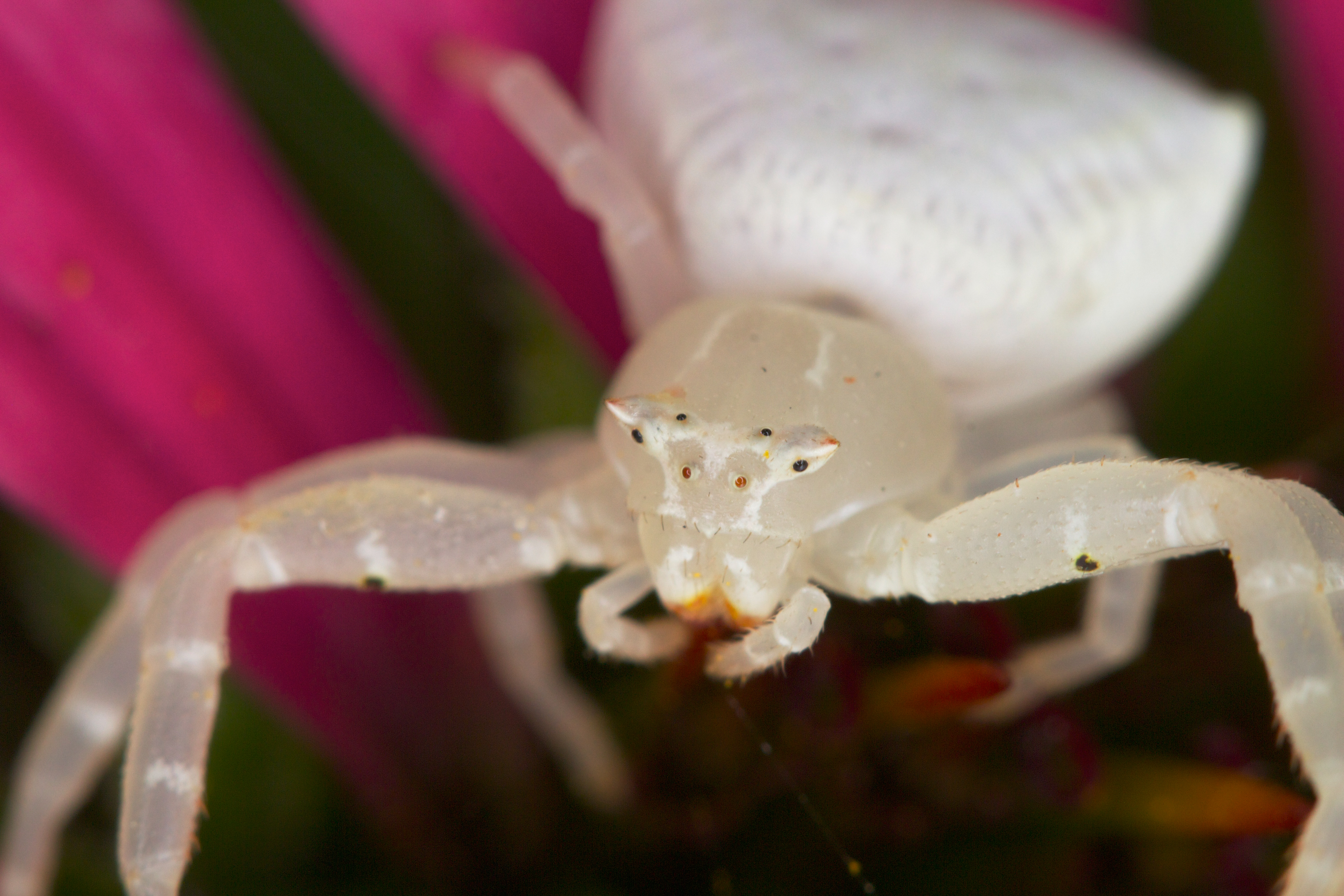
Silk of the spider can be seen here. It is used for retreats rather than webs.

=== Female/male interactions ===
T. spectabilis is sexually dimorphic, where the female spider is larger and stronger than the male spider. Thus, it is the female spider that lies in flowers waiting for pollinators to ambush and capture. The male spider spends the majority of its time searching for females to mate with, and they eat very little overall. The females have evolved to have higher reflectance of light on their abdomen than male spiders; this reflectance is vital to helping them deceive and capture pollinators. Females are also responsible for building the egg-sacs. They build them on curved leaves, and are responsible for guarding the eggs and the offspring.

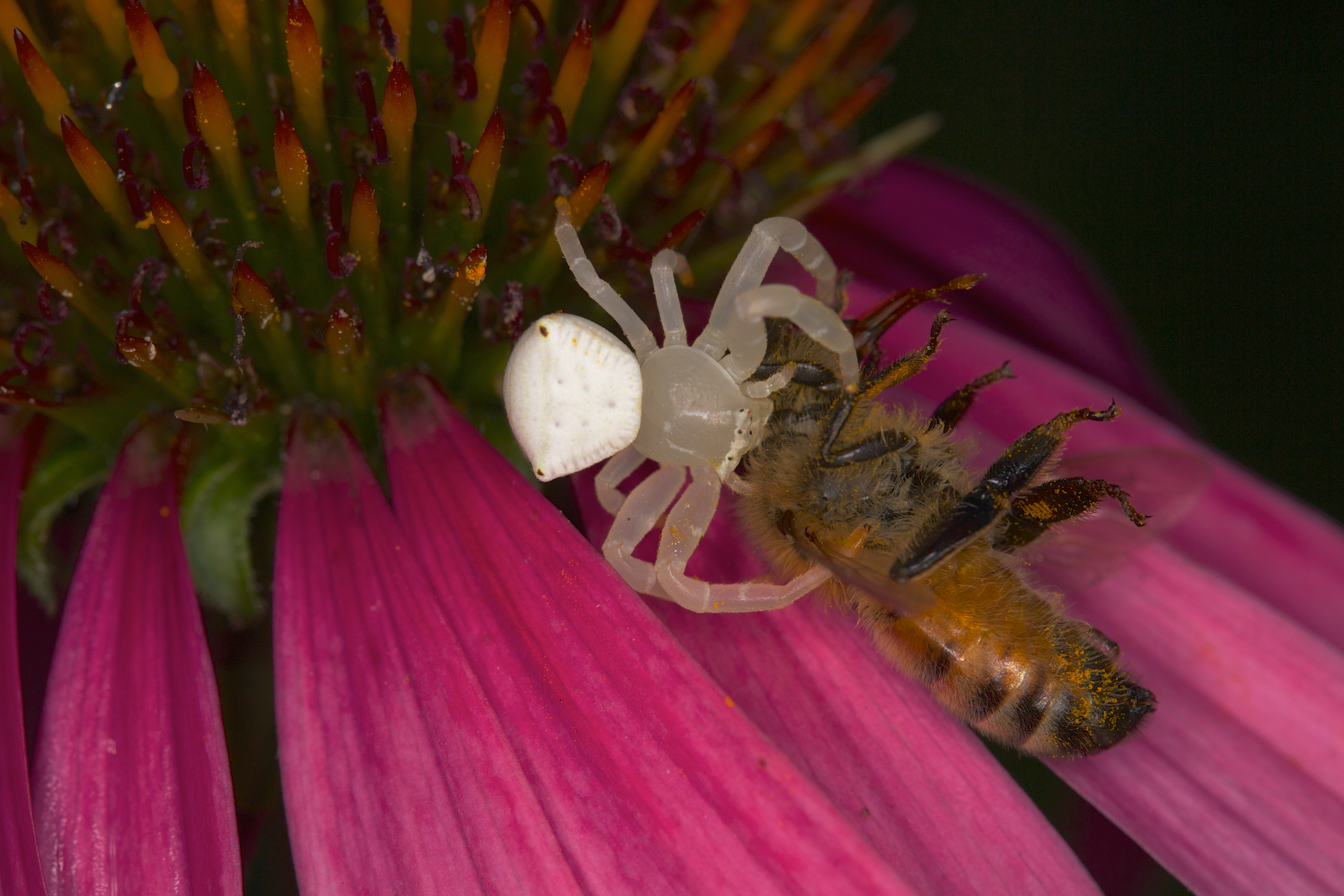
T. spectabilis preying on a bee

=== Coevolution of prey and predator ===
The Australian crab spider eats a variety of bees, but the two main varieties are honeybees and Australian native bees. While the spider's array of prey catching techniques are effective on both types of bees, the honeybee is specifically susceptible due to a lack of coevolution with the Australian crab spider. When the spider creates color contrasts with different flowers in order to trick the bees, the honeybee immediately is drawn to land on the flower in which the spider is waiting. On the other hand, the Australian native bee has coevolved with the Australian crab spider, and thus can discriminate between flowers that have spiders and those that do not. In order for this discrimination to work, the bees must approach the flower closely. Native bees land on the flower that is unoccupied by the spider. This results in many more honeybees being captured by the crab spider than Australian native bees. It is also possible that the Australian native bee has evolved to detect the odor of the crab spiders to help them avoid the spider laden flowers.

The crab spider has coevolved as well to better match the bee varieties they are surrounded by. Different pollinating species are attracted to different levels of UV contrasts, so Thomisus spectabilis has evolved to be able to adjust the UV contrast that they create with the flowers through reflecting varied amounts of UV light. Since honeybees do not have the ability to discriminate between flowers with and without the crab spiders, Thomisus spectabilis will more often create the UV contrast that attracts honeybees than create the UV contrast that attracts the Australian native bee. The UV contrast is also influenced by the predators of Thomisus spectabilis that are in the area. If there are a high number of predators nearby, the crab spider will use low UV reflectance to attract the least amount of attention, and vice versa for times during which there are very few predators.

The non-cryptic nature of Australian crab spiders influences the type of bee that they can capture. The deceit that Thomisus spectabilis use to attract prey actually makes them more conspicuous to the prey. Bees have varying reactions to conspicuousness. For example, in Austroplebeia australis bees there is an aversion to conspicuousness, so the non-cryptic nature of Thomisus spectabilis makes them less likely to capture those types of bees. In contrast, Trigona carbonaria bees do not change their behaviour based on the conspicuousness of spiders, so the Australian crab spider has a better chance of capturing them.

== Bite ==
T. specabilis typically bites more frequently than most spiders. The bites are venomous, and can have mild but significant effects on humans. These effects range from localized pain, redness, dizziness, headaches, nausea, and swelling, but the symptoms generally subside in 1–2 hours after onset.

== See also ==
- List of Thomisidae species
