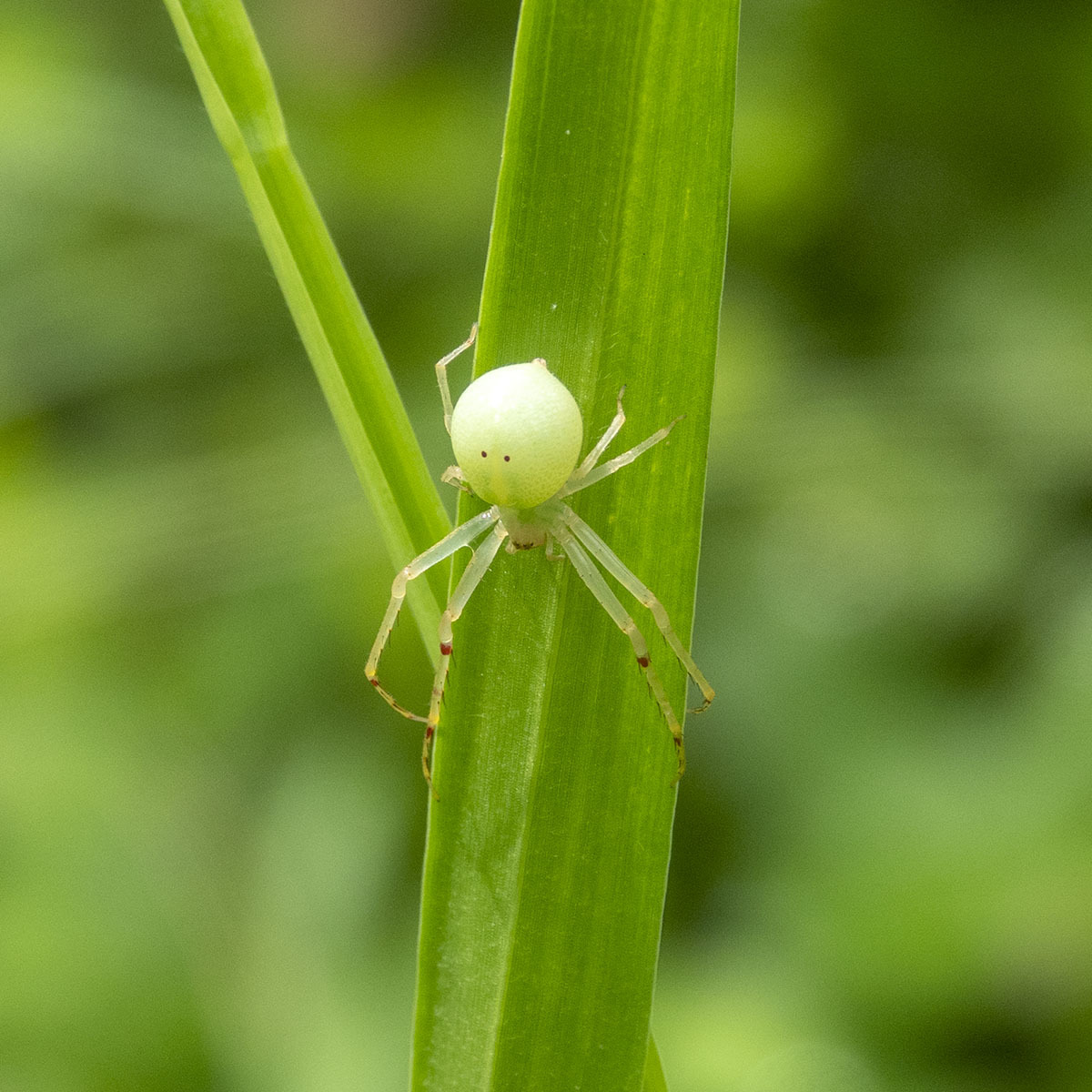
- E. armatus from India

Scientific classification
- Kingdom: Animalia
- Phylum: Arthropoda
- Subphylum: Chelicerata
- Class: Arachnida
- Order: Araneae
- Infraorder: Araneomorphae
- Family: Thomisidae
- Genus: Epidius; Thorell, 1877

Type species
- E. longipalpis Thorell, 1877

Species
- 15, see text

Synonyms
- Cupa Strand, 1906; Pothaeus Thorell, 1895

= Epidius (spider) =

Genus of spiders

Epidius is a genus of crab spiders that was first described by Tamerlan Thorell in 1877. It is a senior synonym of Pothaeus.

== Species ==
As of September 2020 it contains fifteen species and one subspecies, found in Africa and Asia:

- Epidius armatus (Thorell, 1895) – India, Myanmar, Laos, China
- Epidius binotatus Simon, 1897 – West Africa, Congo
  - Epidius b. guineensis Millot, 1942 – Guinea
- Epidius coloratus Benjamin, 2017 – Malaysia (Borneo), Brunei
- Epidius denisi Lessert, 1943 – Congo
- Epidius elongatus Benjamin, 2017 – Thailand
- Epidius floreni Benjamin, 2017 – Malaysia (Borneo)
- Epidius gongi (Song & Kim, 1992) – China
- Epidius longimanus Benjamin, 2017 – India
- Epidius longipalpis Thorell, 1877 (type) – India, Sri Lanka, Indonesia (Java, Sumatra, Seram, Sulawesi)
- Epidius lyriger Simon, 1897 – Philippines
- Epidius mahavira Benjamin, 2017 – India
- Epidius pallidus (Thorell, 1890) – Indonesia (Sumatra)
- Epidius parvati Benjamin, 2000 – Sri Lanka, India
- Epidius rubropictus Simon, 1909 – China, Vietnam, Indonesia (Sumatra)
- Epidius typicus (Bösenberg & Strand, 1906) – Japan

Formerly included:

- E. bipunctatus (Thorell, 1891) (Transferred to Mastira)
- E. brevipalpus Simon, 1903 (Transferred to Pharta)
- E. gongi (Song & Kim, 1992) (Transferred to Epidius)
- E. kalawitanus (Barrion & Litsinger, 1995) (Transferred to Cebrenninus)
- E. zhengi (Ono & Song, 1986) (Transferred to Pharta)

== See also ==
- List of Thomisidae species
