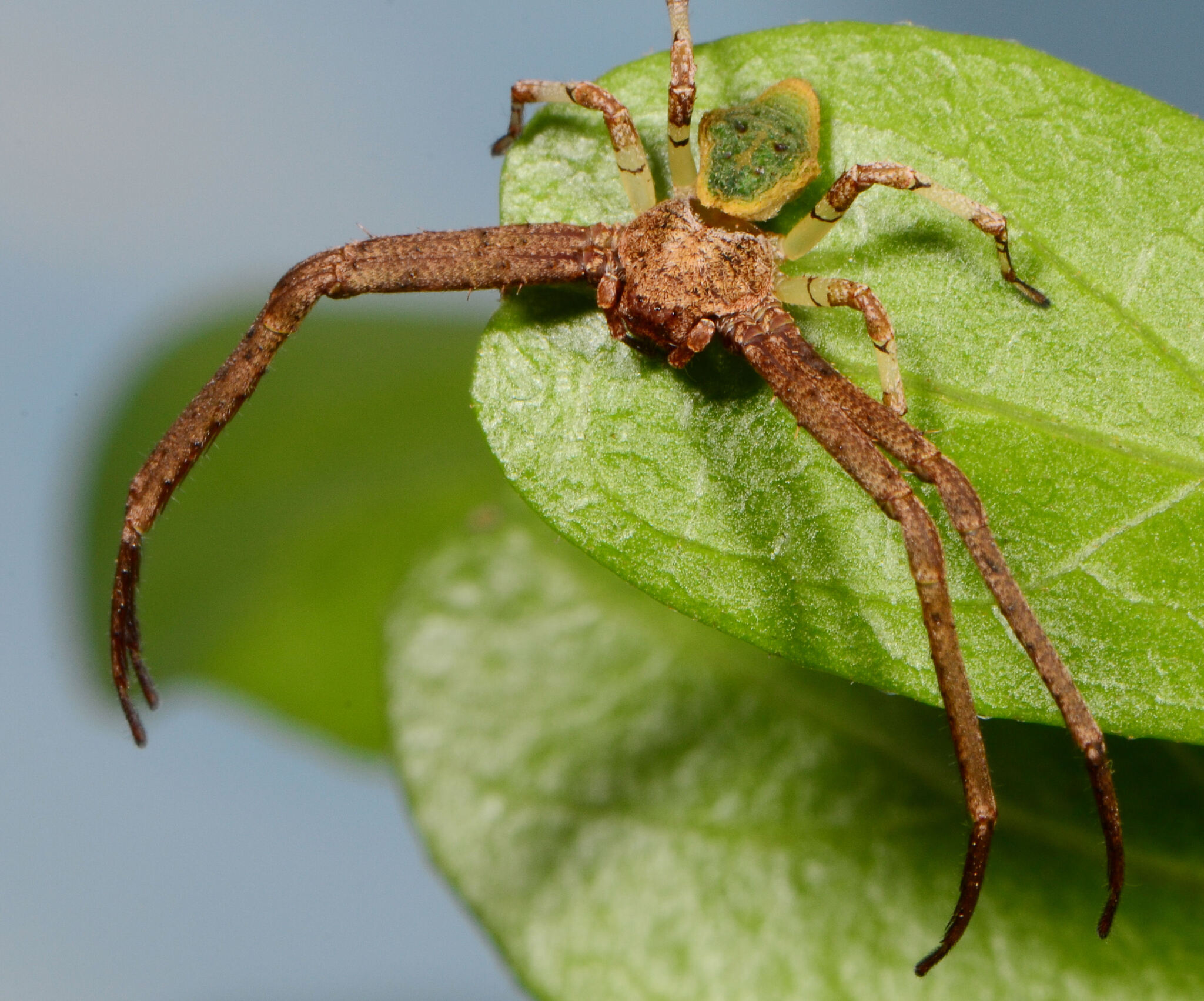
- female G. congoensis from South Africa
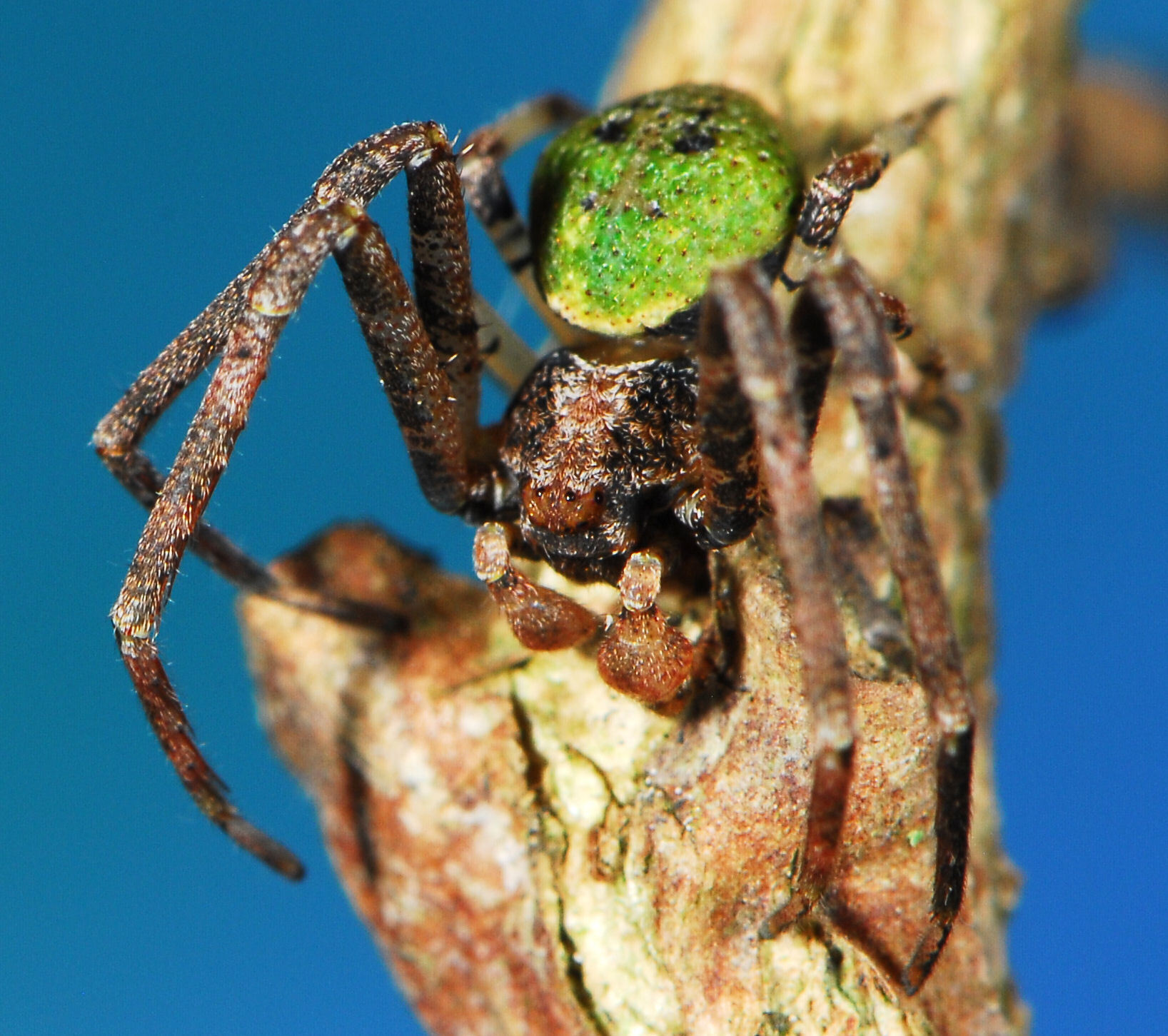
- male G. congoensis from South Africa

Scientific classification
- Kingdom: Animalia
- Phylum: Arthropoda
- Subphylum: Chelicerata
- Class: Arachnida
- Order: Araneae
- Infraorder: Araneomorphae
- Family: Thomisidae
- Genus: Geraesta; Simon, 1889

Type species
- G. hirta Simon, 1889

Species
- 6, see text

= Geraesta =

Genus of spiders

Geraesta is a genus of African crab spiders that was first described by Eugène Louis Simon in 1889.

== Life style ==
Geraesta congoensis are plant-dwellers more commonly found on shrubs and herbs, but occasionally also from tree canopies. With their green colour they are well camouflaged and blend in with the vegetation.

They are usually sampled with sweeping and beating of vegetation. They have mainly been sampled from the Savanna and Forest biomes.

== Description ==
The genus Geraesta comprises spiders that vary from brightly coloured (pink, green, yellow) to dark brown or grey with a mottled appearance. Females and males measure 5 to 7 mm in total length, with males slightly smaller.

The carapace varies from semi-circular, ovoid to elongate, usually with simple erect setae, and eye tubercles are present. The abdomen varies in shape from round to ovoid to elongate with distinct abdominal tubercles and frequently decorated with patterns.

Legs frequently have series of strong spines on the tibiae and metatarsi of the anterior legs.

They can easily be confused with Borboropactus.

== Taxonomy ==
The genus was revised by Benjamin in 2015.

== Species ==
As of October 2025, this genus includes six species:

- Geraesta ansieae Benjamin, 2015 – Rwanda
- Geraesta congoensis (Lessert, 1943) – Ivory Coast, DR Congo, Botswana, South Africa
- Geraesta hirta Simon, 1889 – Comoros, Madagascar (type species)
- Geraesta lehtineni Benjamin, 2011 – Madagascar
- Geraesta mkwawa Benjamin, 2011 – Tanzania
- Geraesta octolobata (Simon, 1886) – Madagascar

In synonymy:

- G. bilobata Simon, 1897 = Geraesta hirta Simon, 1889

== See also ==
- List of Thomisidae species
