= Kryptochroma =

Scientific classification
- Kingdom: Animalia
- Phylum: Arthropoda
- Subphylum: Chelicerata
- Class: Arachnida
- Order: Araneae
- Infraorder: Araneomorphae
- Family: Thomisidae
- Genus: Kryptochroma; Machado, 2021

Type species
- Stephanopis pentacantha (Mello-Leitão, 1929)

Species
- 9, see text

Genus of crab spiders

Kryptochroma is a genus of South American bark-dwelling crab spiders erected by M. Machado, R. Viecelli, and C. Guzati in 2021 after a phylogenetic analysis showed that Stephanopis contained two distinctly different clades. The genus was created for the "pentacantha" clade, as well as for several newly described species.

== Species ==
As of April 2022 it contains nine species:

- K. gigas Machado & Viecelli, 2021 – Brazil
- K. hilaris Machado & Teixeira, 2021 – Brazil
- K. macrostyla (Mello-Leitão, 1929) – Brazil
- K. parahybana (Mello-Leitão, 1929) – French Guiana, Brazil
- K. pentacantha (Mello-Leitão, 1929) (type) – Brazil
- K. quadrata Machado & Viecelli, 2021 – Brazil
- K. quinquetuberculata (Taczanowski, 1872) – Colombia, French Guiana, Brazil
- K. renipalpis (Mello-Leitão, 1929) – Brazil
- K. septata Machado & Teixeira, 2021 – Brazil

== See also ==
- Stephanopis
- Thomisus
- List of Thomisidae genera
