= Borboropactus squalidus =

Scientific classification
- Kingdom: Animalia
- Phylum: Arthropoda
- Subphylum: Chelicerata
- Class: Arachnida
- Order: Araneae
- Infraorder: Araneomorphae
- Family: Thomisidae
- Genus: Borboropactus
- Species: B. squalidus

Binomial name
- Borboropactus squalidus Simon, 1884

Species of spider

Borboropactus squalidus is a species of spider in the family Thomisidae. It is found in southern, western and eastern Africa.

== Distribution ==
Borboropactus squalidus is found in Zambia and South Africa.

In South Africa, the species is presently known only from two provinces including the protected area Silaka Nature Reserve.

== Habitat and ecology ==
Borboropactus squalidus inhabits the Indian Ocean Coastal Belt and Savanna biomes at altitudes ranging from 17 to 164 m above sea level.

They are free-living ground dwellers.

== Conservation ==
Borboropactus squalidus is listed as Data Deficient for Taxonomic reasons by the South African National Biodiversity Institute. The status of the species remains obscure. Some more sampling is needed to collect the male and to determine the species range.

== Taxonomy ==
Borboropactus squalidus was described by Eugène Simon in 1884 from type locality given only as "Afrique austral, Zambèze". The species is known only from the female.
