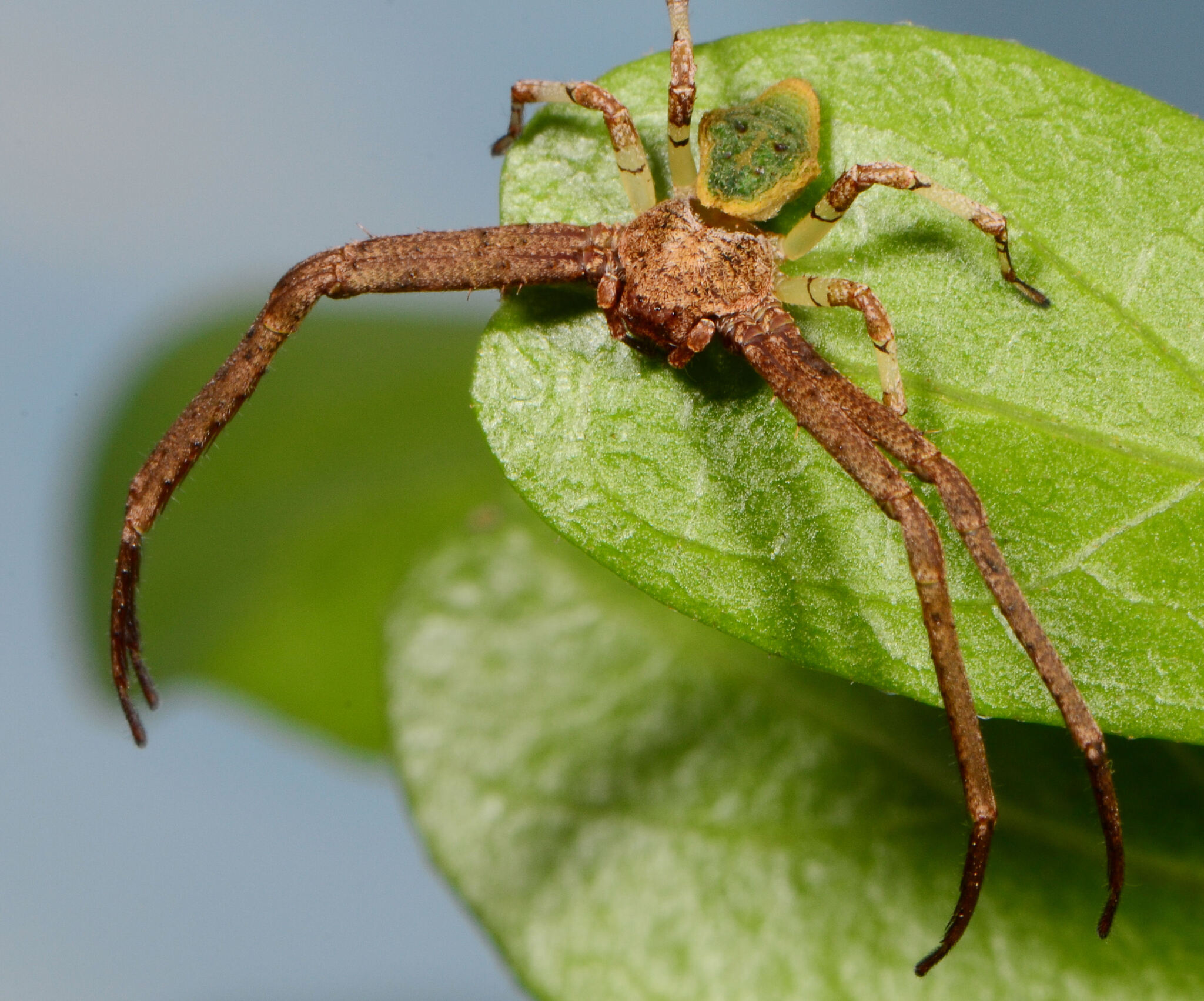
- female
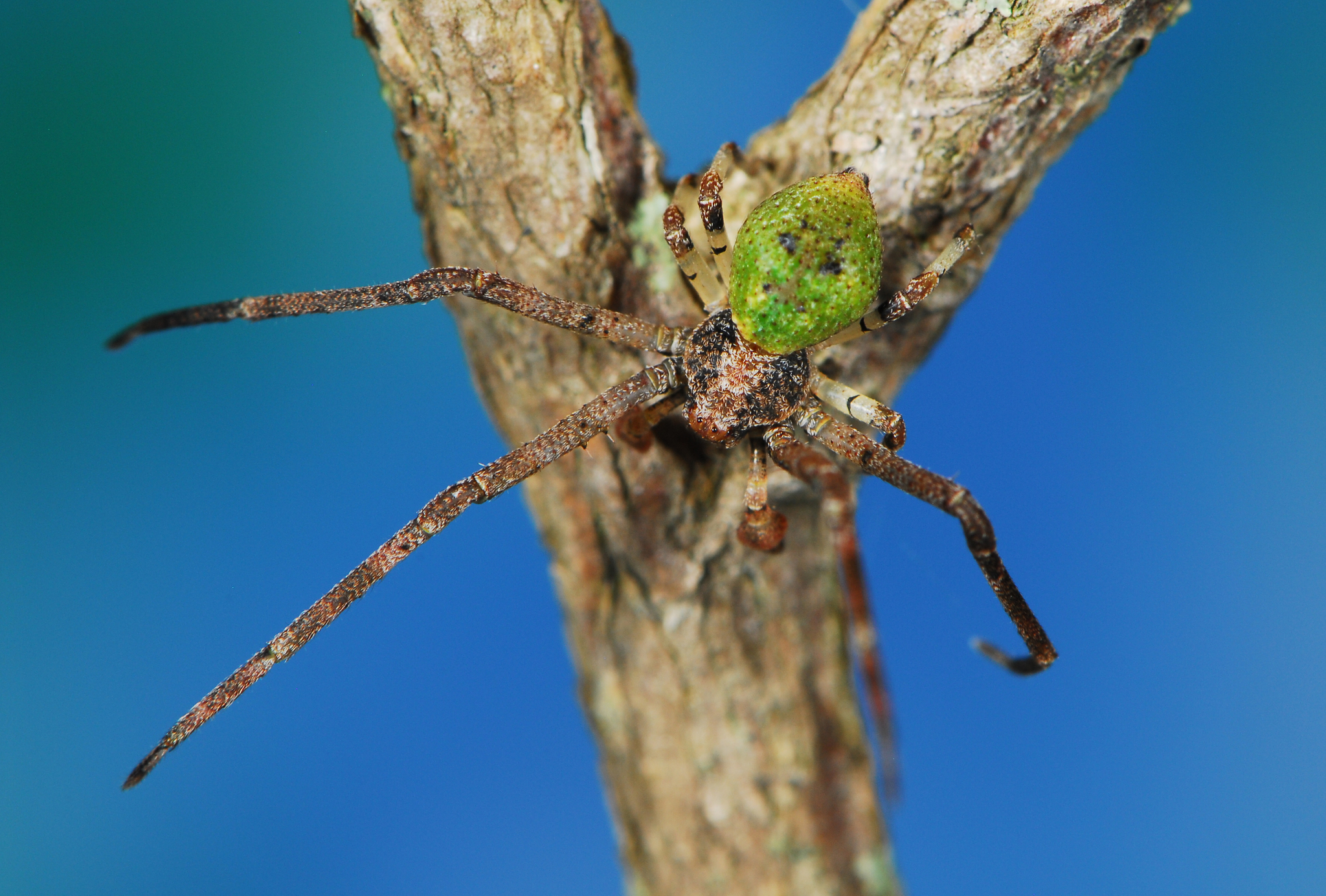
- male

Scientific classification
- Kingdom: Animalia
- Phylum: Arthropoda
- Subphylum: Chelicerata
- Class: Arachnida
- Order: Araneae
- Infraorder: Araneomorphae
- Family: Thomisidae
- Genus: Geraesta
- Species: G. congoensis

Binomial name
- Geraesta congoensis (Lessert, 1943)

Synonyms
- Stephanopis congoensis Lessert, 1943

= Geraesta congoensis =

Green Geraesta Crab Spider

Species of spider

Geraesta congoensis is a species of spider in the family Thomisidae. It is commonly known as the green Geraesta crab spider.

== Distribution ==
Geraesta congoensis is found in Ivory Coast, Democratic Republic of the Congo, Botswana, and South Africa.

In South Africa, it is known from the provinces Eastern Cape, KwaZulu-Natal, Limpopo, and Mpumalanga.

== Habitat and ecology ==
Geraesta congoensis are plant-dwellers found on shrubs and herbs, and occasionally in tree canopies. Their green colour provides camouflage among vegetation. This rare species has been sampled with sweep nets from plants in the Indian Ocean Coastal Belt, Thicket and Savanna biomes at altitudes ranging from 4 to 1842 m.

== Description ==
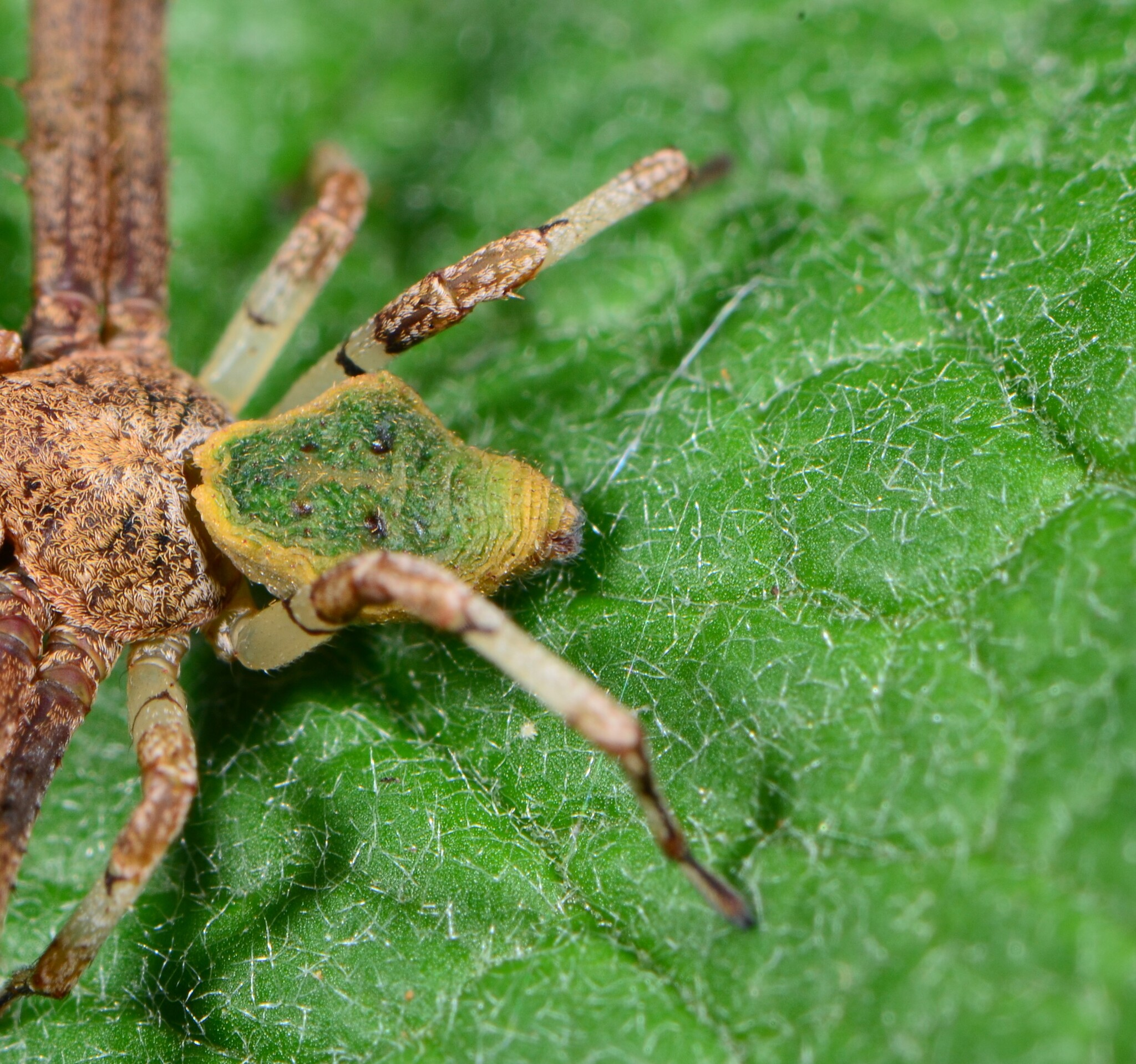
female

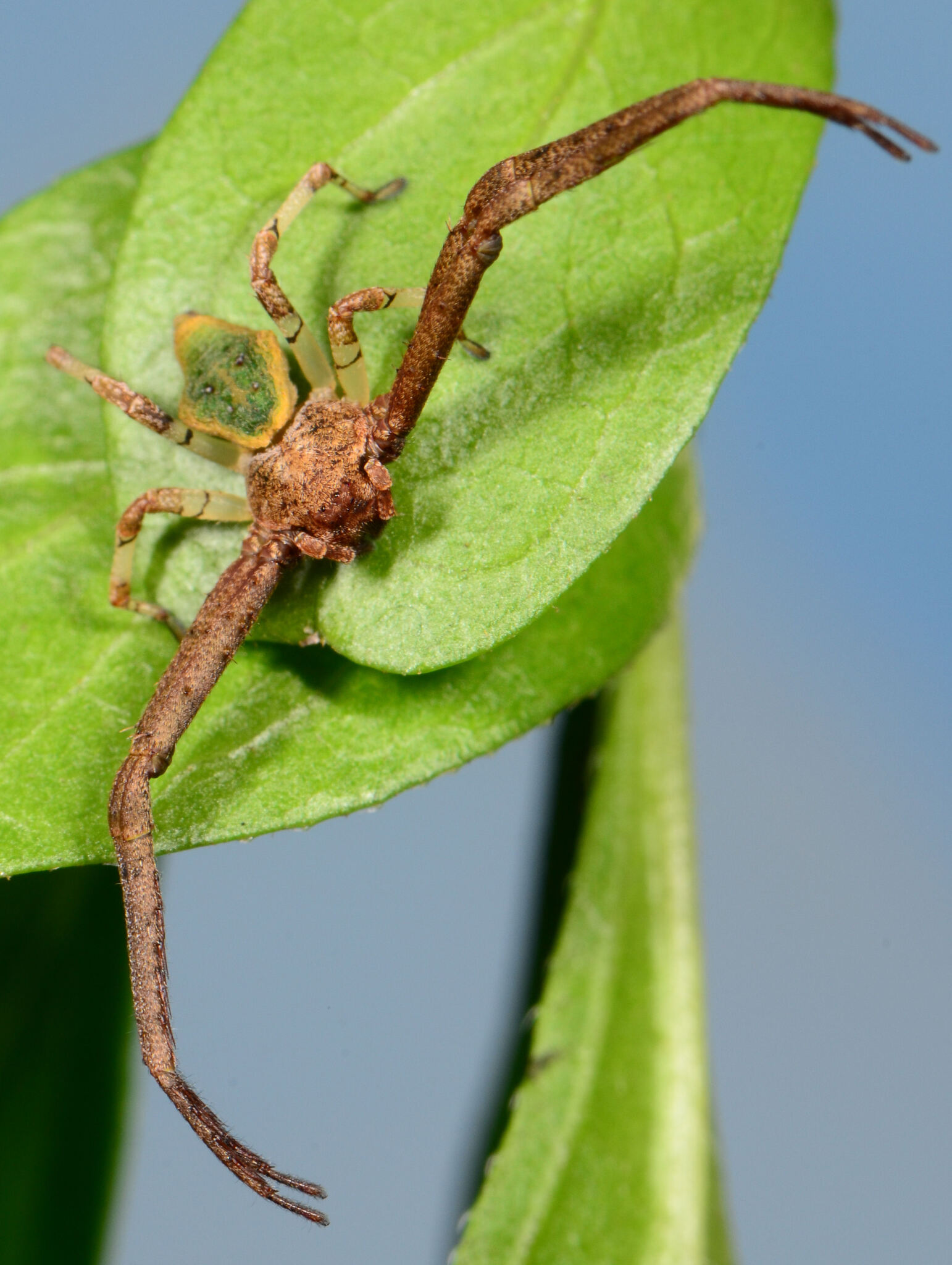
female

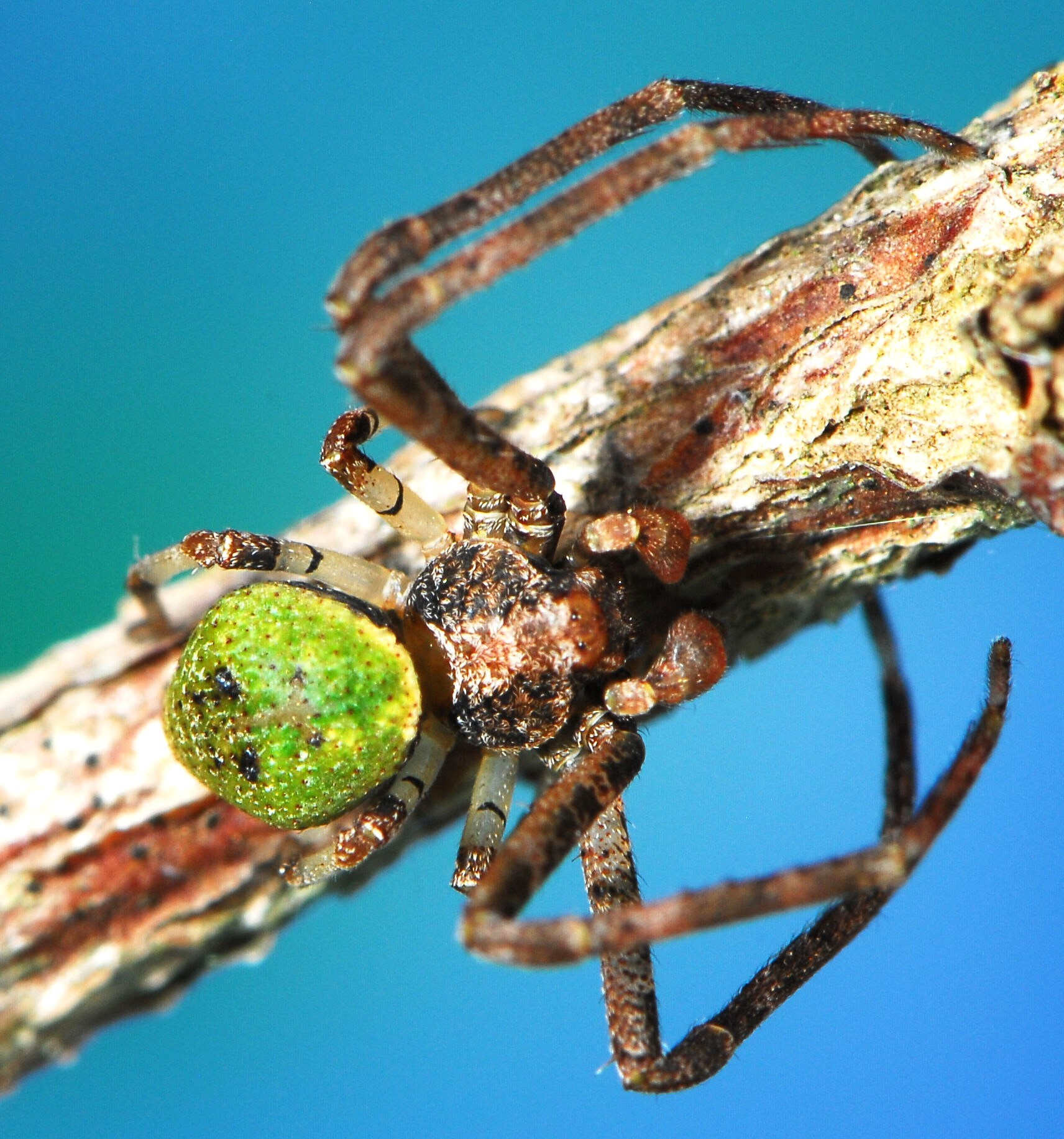
male

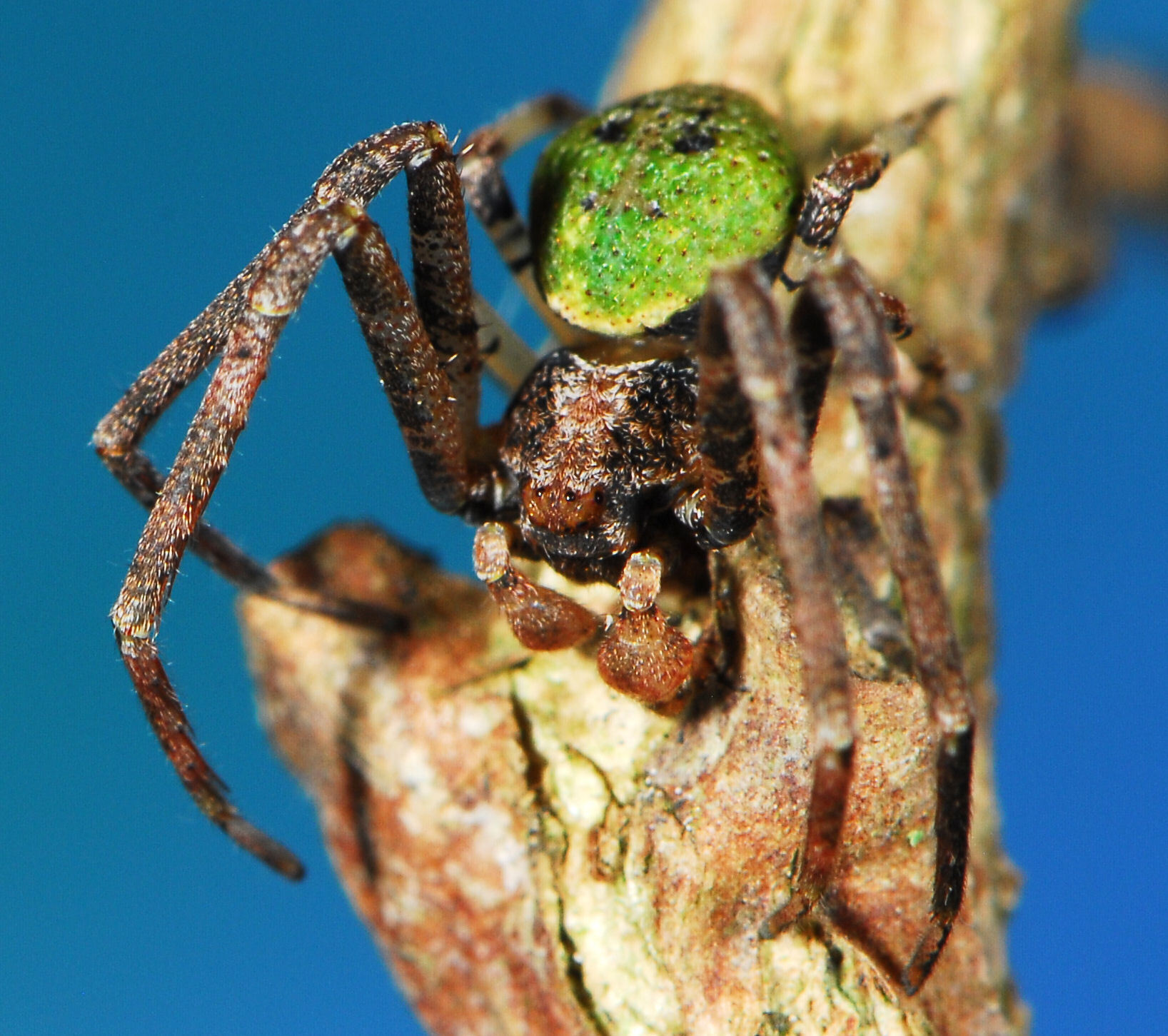
male

== Conservation ==
Geraesta congoensis is protected in five protected areas including Baviaanskloof Nature Reserve, Giant's Castle Nature Reserve, Hluhluwe Nature Reserve, Ndumo Game Reserve and Tembe Elephant Park. Due to its large range, the species is listed as Least Concern by the South African National Biodiversity Institute.

== Taxonomy ==
Geraesta congoensis was originally described by Lessert in 1943 as Stephanopis congoensis from the Democratic Republic of the Congo. The species was transferred to Geraesta by Benjamin in 2015.
