= Epidius parvati =

Scientific classification
- Kingdom: Animalia
- Phylum: Arthropoda
- Subphylum: Chelicerata
- Class: Arachnida
- Order: Araneae
- Infraorder: Araneomorphae
- Family: Thomisidae
- Genus: Epidius
- Species: E. parvati

Binomial name
- Epidius parvati Benjamin, 2000

Species of spider

Epidius parvati, is a species of spider of the genus Epidius. It is endemic to Sri Lanka. The specific name parvati came from the name of Hindu goddess Parvati.

== See also ==
- List of Thomisidae species
