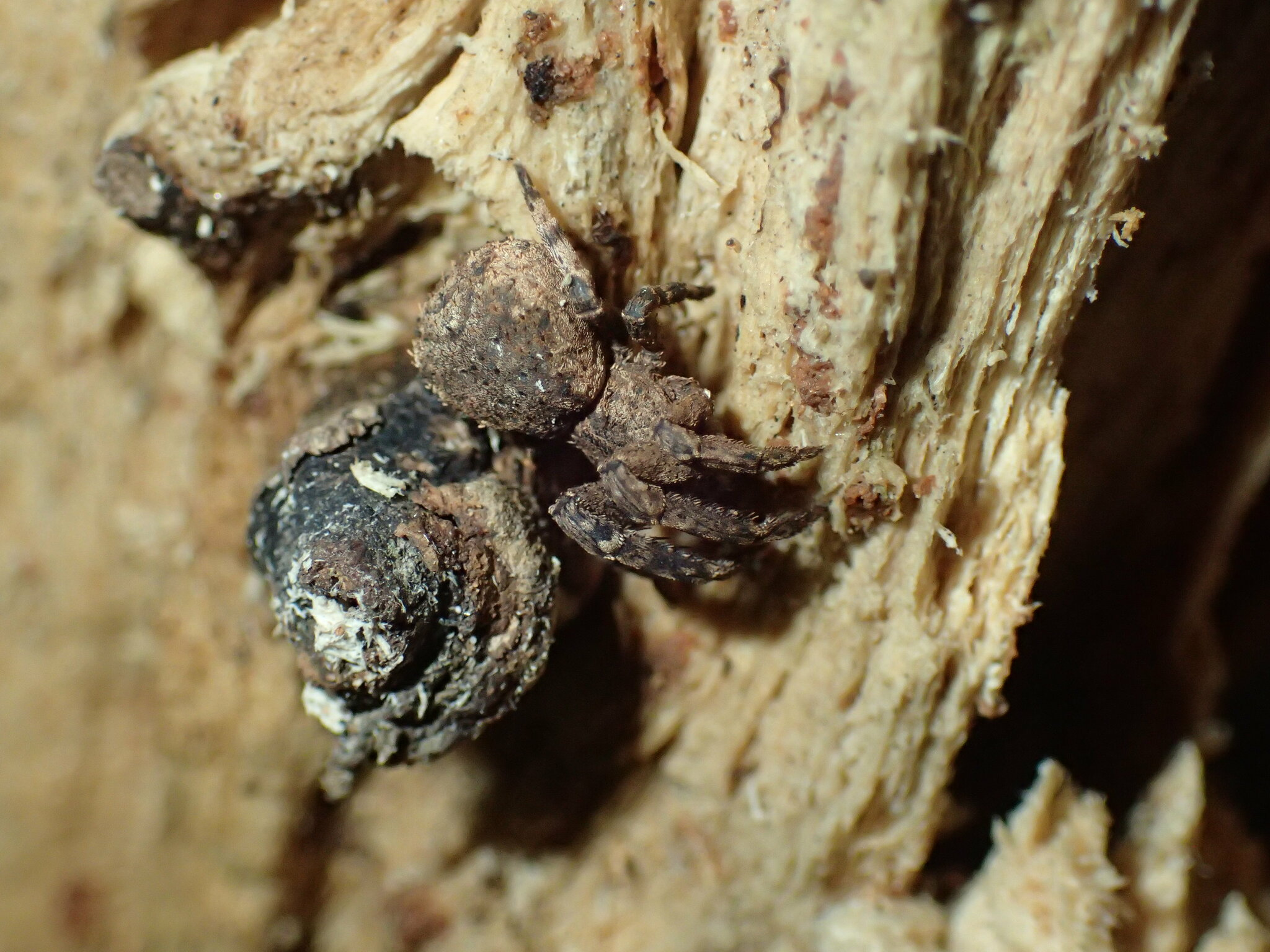
- Female B. silvicola
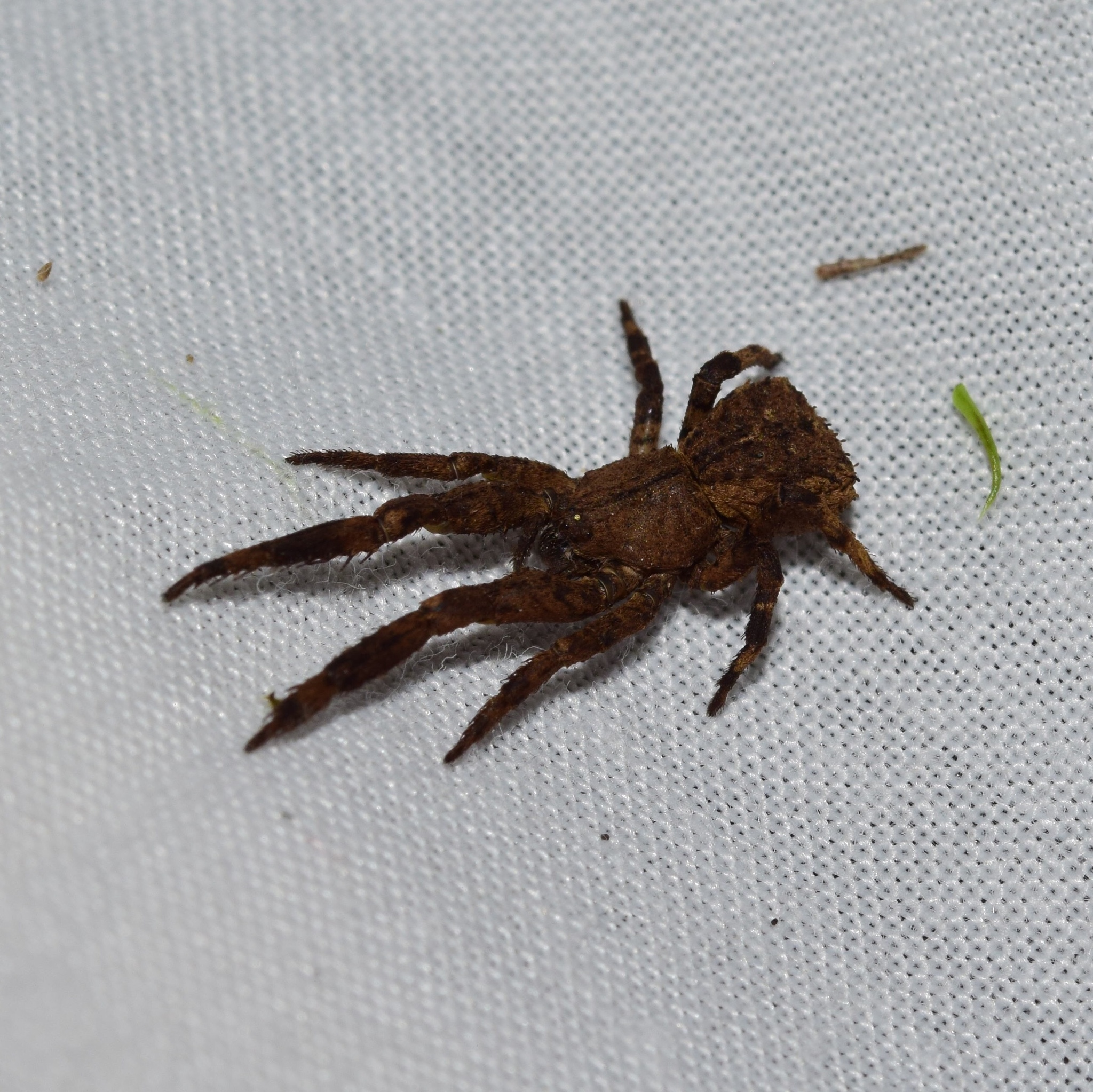

Scientific classification
- Kingdom: Animalia
- Phylum: Arthropoda
- Subphylum: Chelicerata
- Class: Arachnida
- Order: Araneae
- Infraorder: Araneomorphae
- Family: Thomisidae
- Genus: Borboropactus
- Species: B. silvicola

Binomial name
- Borboropactus silvicola (Lawrence, 1938)

Synonyms
- Regillus silvicolus Lawrence, 1938

= Borboropactus silvicola =

Species of spider

Borboropactus silvicola is a species of crab spider in the family Thomisidae. It is endemic to South Africa.

== Distribution ==
Borboropactus silvicola is distributed across four provinces of South Africa: Eastern Cape, KwaZulu-Natal, Limpopo and Mpumalanga.

In the Eastern Cape, it has been recorded from several protected areas including Cwebe Nature Reserve, Dwesa Nature Reserve, Mkambati Nature Reserve, and Silaka Nature Reserve. In KwaZulu-Natal, the species is known from Durban, Eshowe, the Dlinza forest, and Vernon Crookes Nature Reserve. The northernmost records are from Lekgalameetse Nature Reserve and Entabeni State Forest in Limpopo province.

== Habitat ==
Borboropactus silvicola is a free-living ground dweller found under logs among decaying leaves in damp areas. The species has been recorded from Forest, Indian Ocean Coastal Belt, Savanna and Thicket biomes from sea level to elevations of 1,362 m. It has also been found in agricultural areas, including maize fields.

During surveys, specimens are typically collected in pitfall traps and are often covered with mud and sand particles that adhere to their specialized setae.

== Description ==
Females of B. silvicola measure 7–8 mm in total length, while males are slightly smaller at 6–7 mm. The cephalothorax is dark brown and covered with dense whitish curled setae, except in the median area. Longer clavate setae are present on the posterior border and around the eye region.

The eyes are arranged in two rows, with the anterior row slightly procurved and the posterior row very slightly recurved. The anterior median eyes are larger than the anterior lateral eyes.

The legs are the same dark brown color as the cephalothorax. The front legs are directed forward rather than sideways, with thick, inflated femora. The tibiae and metatarsi of the first and second pairs of legs are notably thick and bear long macrosetae arranged in a double row on the underside.

The opisthosoma is triangular, broadening toward the posterior end. Dorsally, it is brown without distinct patterns, becoming paler on the sides. The entire body is covered with dense, short, white clavate hairs interspersed with longer clavate setae.

== Behaviour ==
The species blends in with its surroundings due to its mottled coloration and general appearance. The specialized setae covering the body often collect debris, with mud and sand particles adhering to the hairs, further enhancing their camouflage.

== Taxonomy ==
The species was first described by Reginald Frederick Lawrence in 1938 as Regillus silvicolus from specimens collected at Port Shepstone, KwaZulu-Natal. In 1955, Carl Friedrich Roewer transferred the species to the genus Borboropactus.

== Conservation status ==
Borboropactus silvicola is currently listed as Least Concern due to its wide geographical range across South Africa. It is protected in eight protected areas, including Dwesa Nature Reserve, Mkambati Nature Reserve, Cwebe Nature Reserve, Silaka Nature Reserve, Vernon Crookes Nature Reserve, Lekgalameetse Nature Reserve, Entabeni State Forest, and Dlinza forest.
