= Borboropactus asper =

Scientific classification
- Kingdom: Animalia
- Phylum: Arthropoda
- Subphylum: Chelicerata
- Class: Arachnida
- Order: Araneae
- Infraorder: Araneomorphae
- Family: Thomisidae
- Genus: Borboropactus
- Species: B. asper

Binomial name
- Borboropactus asper (O. Pickard-Cambridge, 1884)

Species of spider

Borboropactus asper is a species of spiders of the genus Borboropactus. It is endemic to Sri Lanka.

== See also ==
- List of Thomisidae species
