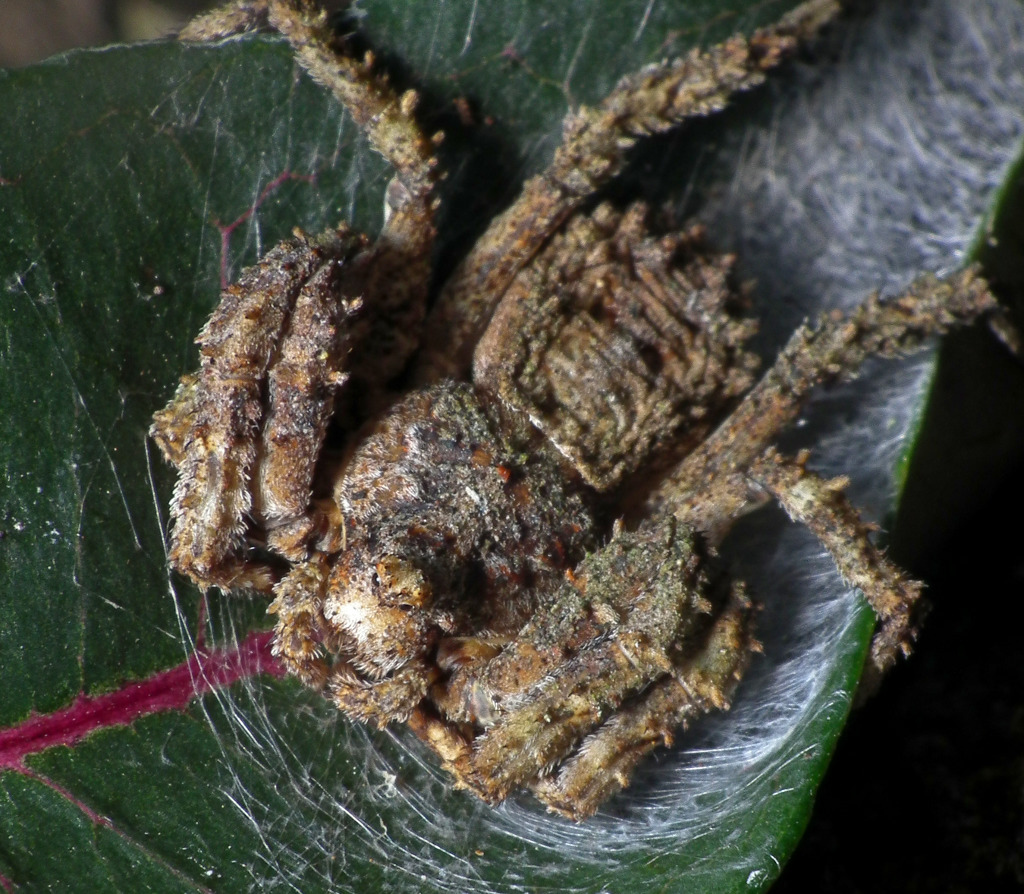

Scientific classification
- Kingdom: Animalia
- Phylum: Arthropoda
- Subphylum: Chelicerata
- Class: Arachnida
- Order: Araneae
- Infraorder: Araneomorphae
- Family: Thomisidae
- Genus: Stephanopis
- Species: S. altifrons

Binomial name
- Stephanopis altifrons O. Pickard-Cambridge, 1869

Synonyms
- Stephanopis monticola Bradley, 1871: 234 (synonymized by Machado, Teixeira & Milledge, 2019: 224); Type locality: Tia, New South Wales, Australia.; Holotype: female ♀. OUMNH 619.; Stephanopis depressa Bradley, 1871: 236 (synonymized by Machado, Teixeira & Milledge, 2019: 224); Type locality: Cape York, Queensland, Australia.; Holotype: female ♀. OUMNH 555.; Stephanopis elongata Bradley, 1871: 236 (synonymized by Machado, Teixeira & Milledge, 2019: 224); Type locality: Cape York, Queensland, Australia.; Syntypes: 1 adult male ♂ and 1 juvenile. OUMNH 551; Stephanopis scabra Koch, 1874: 505 (synonymized by Machado, Teixeira & Milledge, 2019: 224); Type locality: Sydney [33°52'S 151°12'E, New South Wales, Australia]; Syntypes: 2 adult females ♀. ZMB 3411.; Stephanopis aspera Rainbow, 1893: 471 (synonymized by Machado, Teixeira & Milledge, 2019: 224); Type locality: Wombeyan Karst Conservation Reserve [34°18'S 149°57'E, New South Wales, Australia]; Cotype: . female ♀. AMS KS.6681.

= Stephanopis altifrons =

Species of spider

Stephanopis altifrons is a species of crab spider found in Australia. The body length may reach up to 10 and 6 mm in the female and male, respectively. The colour is usually brown, or shades of grey, and sometimes black. The egg sac is 7.5 mm in diameter. Often hidden in crevices of tree bark, it is irregular in shape and camouflaged with the debris. Eggs are off-white, 25 to 30 in number. The female rests with the eggs. The food of this spider appears to be other spiders. Recorded prey include members of the families Salticidae and Hersiliidae.

== Taxonomic issues ==
According to Pickard-Cambridge, the single specimen used for the description of S. altifrons (the holotype) was dry-pinned rather than preserved in ethanol. Therefore, the specimen could not be properly examined, so it was not possible to determine if the specimen was an adult. Moreover, he described his own sketch of the spider as “hasty”. This may explain why the somatic characters were inadequately described, genitalic features were not mentioned at all, and the illustrations were insufficiently detailed, making it difficult for others to distinguish this species.

== See also ==
- List of Thomisidae species
