= Borboropactus australis =

Zululand Borboropactus crab spider

Scientific classification
- Kingdom: Animalia
- Phylum: Arthropoda
- Subphylum: Chelicerata
- Class: Arachnida
- Order: Araneae
- Infraorder: Araneomorphae
- Family: Thomisidae
- Genus: Borboropactus
- Species: B. australis

Binomial name
- Borboropactus australis (Lawrence, 1937)

Synonyms
- Regillus australis Lawrence, 1937

Species of spider

Borboropactus australis is a species of spider in the family Thomisidae. It is endemic to South Africa and is commonly known as Zululand Borboropactus crab spider.

== Distribution ==
Borboropactus australis is found only in South Africa, where it is known only from KwaZulu-Natal province. It is a rare species and has only been sampled from a few localities including the two protected areas Hluhluwe Nature Reserve and Ngome State Forest.

== Habitat and ecology ==
Borboropactus australis inhabits the Indian Ocean Coastal Belt and Savanna biomes at altitudes ranging from 43 to 1129 m above sea level.

These are free-living ground dwellers found under logs among decaying leaves in damp areas.

== Conservation ==
Borboropactus australis is listed as Data Deficient for Taxonomic reasons by the South African National Biodiversity Institute. The status of the species remains obscure. Some more sampling is needed to collect the male and to determine the species range. It is protected in two protected areas.

== Etymology ==
The species epithet australis means "southern" in Latin, referring to its distribution in the southern part of Africa.

== Taxonomy ==
Borboropactus australis was originally described by Lawrence in 1937 as Regillus australis from Hluhluwe. It was transferred to Borboropactus by Roewer in 1955. The species is known only from the female.

== See also ==
- Glossary of spider terms
