= Cebrenninus =

Scientific classification
- Kingdom: Animalia
- Phylum: Arthropoda
- Subphylum: Chelicerata
- Class: Arachnida
- Order: Araneae
- Infraorder: Araneomorphae
- Family: Thomisidae
- Genus: Cebrenninus; Simon, 1887

Type species
- C. rugosus Simon, 1887

Species
- 10, see text

Synonyms
- Ascurisoma Strand, 1928

Genus of spiders

Cebrenninus is a genus of crab spiders that was first described by S. P. Benjamin in 2016. It is a senior synonym of Ascurisoma.

== Species ==
As of June 2020 it contains ten species, found in Asia and Africa:

- Cebrenninus banten Benjamin, 2016 – Indonesia (Java)
- Cebrenninus berau Benjamin, 2016 – Indonesia (Sumatra, Borneo)
- Cebrenninus kalawitanus (Barrion & Litsinger, 1995) – Philippines (Luzon)
- Cebrenninus magnus Benjamin, 2016 – China, Laos, Thailand, Indonesia (Java), Borneo
- Cebrenninus phaedrae Benjamin, 2016 – Malaysia, Indonesia (Sumatra, Borneo)
- Cebrenninus rugosus Simon, 1887 (type) – China, Thailand, Laos, Malaysia, Indonesia (Java, Sumatra), Borneo, Philippines
- Cebrenninus schawalleri Benjamin, 2016 – Philippines
- Cebrenninus srivijaya Benjamin, 2011 – Indonesia (Sumatra)
- Cebrenninus striatipes (Simon, 1897) – West Africa, Sri Lanka
- Cebrenninus tangi Benjamin, 2016 – Indonesia (Sumatra, Borneo)

Formerly included:

- C. laevis (Thorell, 1890) (Transferred to Crockeria)

== See also ==
- List of Thomisidae species
