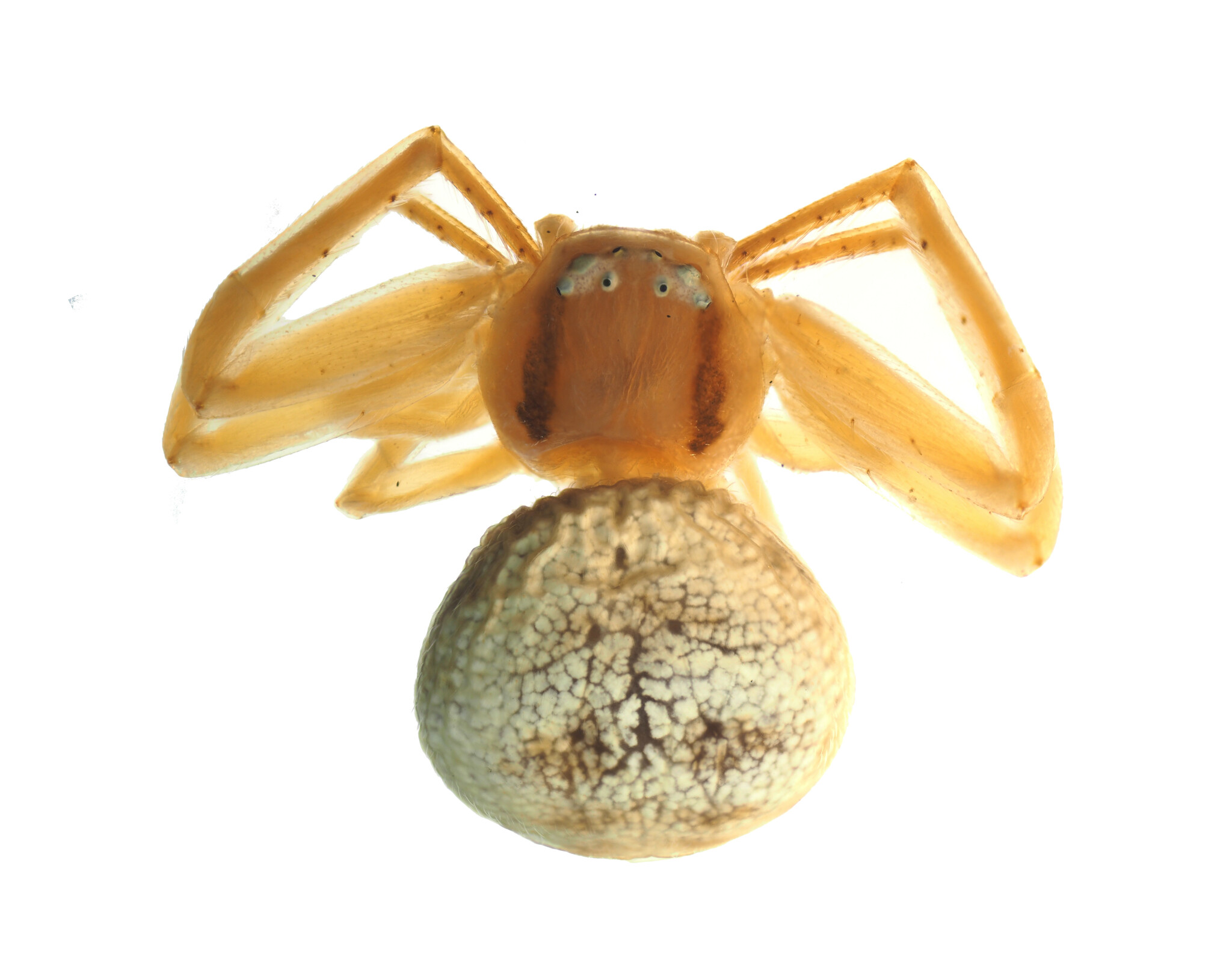
- M. adusta from Australia

Scientific classification
- Kingdom: Animalia
- Phylum: Arthropoda
- Subphylum: Chelicerata
- Class: Arachnida
- Order: Araneae
- Infraorder: Araneomorphae
- Family: Thomisidae
- Genus: Mastira; Thorell, 1891

Type species
- Mastira bipunctata

Species
- 10, see text

= Mastira =

Genus of spiders

Mastira is a genus of spiders in the family Thomisidae. It was first described in 1891 by Tamerlan Thorell. As of 2017, it contains 10 species.

== Species ==
Mastira comprises the following species:

- Mastira adusta (L. Koch, 1867) – New Guinea, Samoa, Australia (Queensland, New South Wales)
- Mastira bipunctata Thorell, 1891 – Taiwan, Singapore, Indonesia (Sumatra)
- Mastira bitaeniata (Thorell, 1878) – Indonesia (Ambon)
- Mastira cimicina (Thorell, 1881) – Philippines, Indonesia (Aru Is.), Australia (Queensland)
- Mastira flavens (Thorell, 1877) – Taiwan, Philippines, Indonesia (Sulawesi)
- Mastira menoka (Tikader, 1963) – India
- Mastira nicobarensis (Tikader, 1980) – India (mainland, Nicobar Is.)
- Mastira nitida (Thorell, 1877) – Philippines, Indonesia (Sulawesi, Ambon, Moluccas)
- Mastira serrula Tang & Li, 2010 – China
- Mastira tegularis Xu, Han & Li, 2008 – China (Hong Kong)
