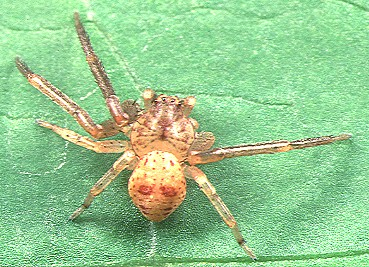
- P. brevipalpus, male

Scientific classification
- Domain: Eukaryota
- Kingdom: Animalia
- Phylum: Arthropoda
- Subphylum: Chelicerata
- Class: Arachnida
- Order: Araneae
- Infraorder: Araneomorphae
- Family: Thomisidae
- Genus: Pharta; Thorell, 1891

Type species
- Pharta bimaculata

Species
- 10, see text

Synonyms
- Sanmenia

= Pharta =

Genus of spiders

Pharta is a genus of crab spiders, family Thomisidae, first described by Tamerlan Thorell in 1891.

== Species ==
As of April 2022, it contains ten Asian species:

- Pharta bimaculata Thorell, 1891 – Malaysia, Singapore
- Pharta brevipalpus (Simon, 1903) – China, Vietnam, Japan (Ryukyu Is.)
- Pharta gongshan (Yang, Zhu & Song, 2006) – China
- Pharta indica Sen, Saha & Raychaudhuri, 2012 – India
- Pharta koponeni Benjamin, 2014 – Thailand
- Pharta lingxiufengica (Liu, 2022) – China
- Pharta nigra (Tang, Griswold & Peng, 2009) – Myanmar
- Pharta sudmannorum Benjamin, 2014 – Malaysia (Borneo)
- Pharta tangi Wang, Mi & Peng, 2016 – China
- Pharta tengchong (Tang, Griswold & Yin, 2009) – China
