= Crockeria =

Scientific classification
- Domain: Eukaryota
- Kingdom: Animalia
- Phylum: Arthropoda
- Subphylum: Chelicerata
- Class: Arachnida
- Order: Araneae
- Infraorder: Araneomorphae
- Family: Thomisidae
- Genus: Crockeria; Benjamin, 2016

Type species
- Crockeria kinabalu

Species
- Crockeria kinabalu Benjamin, 2016 - Borneo; Crockeria laevis (Thorell, 1890) - Sumatra

Genus of spiders

Crockeria is a genus of spiders in the family Thomisidae. It was first described in 2016 by Benjamin. As of 2017, it contains 2 species.
