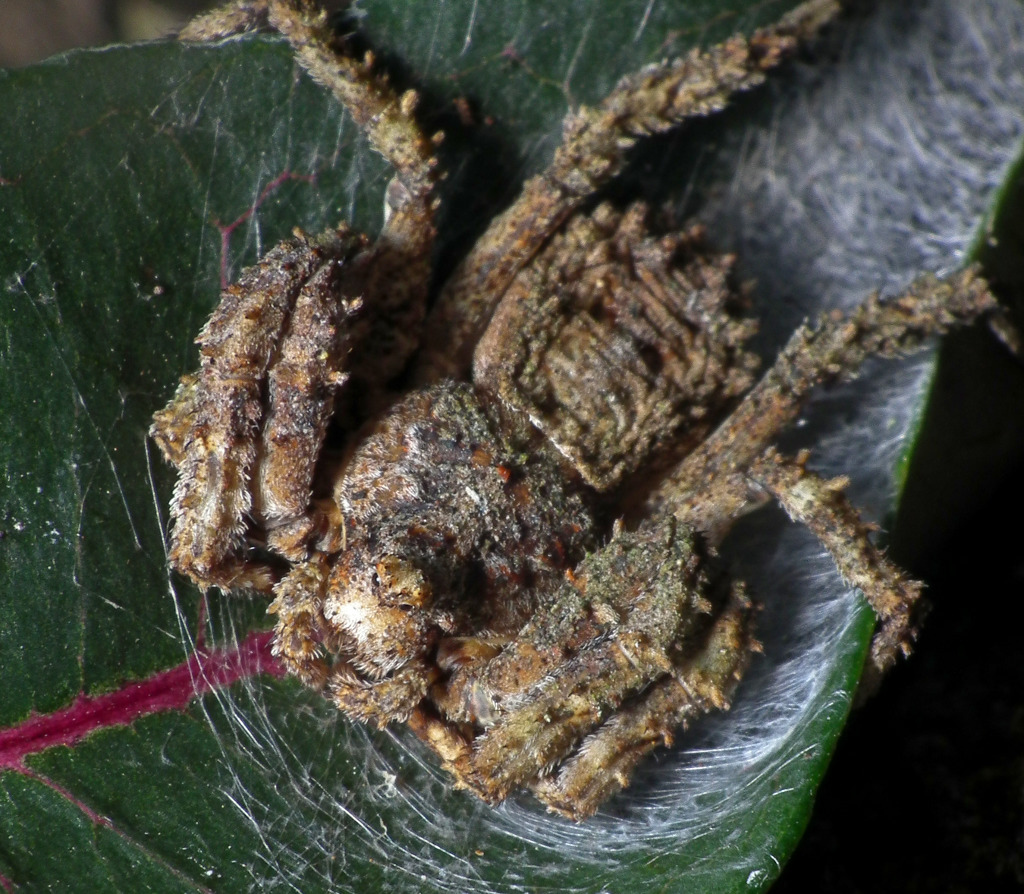
- S. altifrons

Scientific classification
- Domain: Eukaryota
- Kingdom: Animalia
- Phylum: Arthropoda
- Subphylum: Chelicerata
- Class: Arachnida
- Order: Araneae
- Infraorder: Araneomorphae
- Family: Thomisidae
- Genus: Stephanopis; O. Pickard-Cambridge, 1869

Type species
- Stephanopis altifrons

Species
- 24, see text

= Stephanopis =

Genus of spiders

Stephanopis is a genus of crab spiders first described by Octavius Pickard-Cambridge in 1869. It was erected for five then newly described species, including S. altifrons, from Australia. Stephanopis was characterized by the high cephalic region with unequally sized anterior eyes (ALE larger than AME) disposed in a strongly recurved row, opisthosoma ending in several spiniform projections and dorsoventrally depressed habitus. According to Pickard-Cambridge, the single specimen used for the description of S. altifrons was dry-pinned. Therefore the specimen could not be properly examined, so it was not possible to determine if the specimen was adult. Moreover, he states his own sketch of the spider as “hasty” or "dull". This may explain why the somatic characters were inadequately described, genitalic features were not mentioned at all, and the illustrations were not detailed enough, making the species unidentifiable.

== Species ==
As of April 2022, it contained 24 species:

- Stephanopis altifrons O. Pickard-Cambridge, 1869 – Australia (Queensland, New South Wales, Tasmania)
- Stephanopis angulata Rainbow, 1899 – Papua New Guinea (New Guinea, New Britain)
- Stephanopis armata L. Koch, 1874 – Australia (Queensland, New South Wales)
- Stephanopis badia Keyserling, 1880 – Colombia
- Stephanopis barbipes Keyserling, 1890 – Australia (Western Australia, Queensland, New South Wales, Tasmania)
- Stephanopis bicornis L. Koch, 1874 – Australia (South Australia, Queensland, New South Wales, Tasmania), Papua New Guinea (Yule Is.), Indonesia (Aru Is.)
- Stephanopis carcinoides Machado, 2019 – Papua New Guinea (New Guinea), Australia (Queensland, New South Wales)
- Stephanopis corticalis L. Koch, 1876 – Australia (Northern Territory, Queensland)
- Stephanopis erinacea Karsch, 1878 – Fiji
- Stephanopis exigua (Nicolet, 1849) – Chile
- Stephanopis fissifrons Rainbow, 1920 – Australia (Lord Howe Is., New South Wales)
- Stephanopis flagellata Machado, 2019 – Australia (Queensland, New South Wales)
- Stephanopis hystrix Mello-Leitão, 1951 – Chile
- Stephanopis lata O. Pickard-Cambridge, 1869 – Australia (Western Australia, Queensland, New South Wales, Victoria, Tasmania)
- Stephanopis lobata L. Koch, 1874 – Australia (Queensland, New South Wales)
- Stephanopis maulliniana Mello-Leitão, 1951 – Chile
- Stephanopis monulfi Chrysanthus, 1964 – Indonesia (New Guinea), Papua New Guinea, Australia (Queensland)
- Stephanopis nana Machado, 2019 – Australia (Queensland)
- Stephanopis nigra O. Pickard-Cambridge, 1869 – Australia (Queensland, New South Wales, Tasmania)
- Stephanopis spissa (Nicolet, 1849) – Chile
- Stephanopis squalida Machado, 2019 – Australia (Queensland)
- Stephanopis thomisoides Bradley, 1871 – Australia (Queensland)
- Stephanopis verrucosa (Nicolet, 1849) – Chile
- Stephanopis xiangzhouica (Liu, 2022) – China
