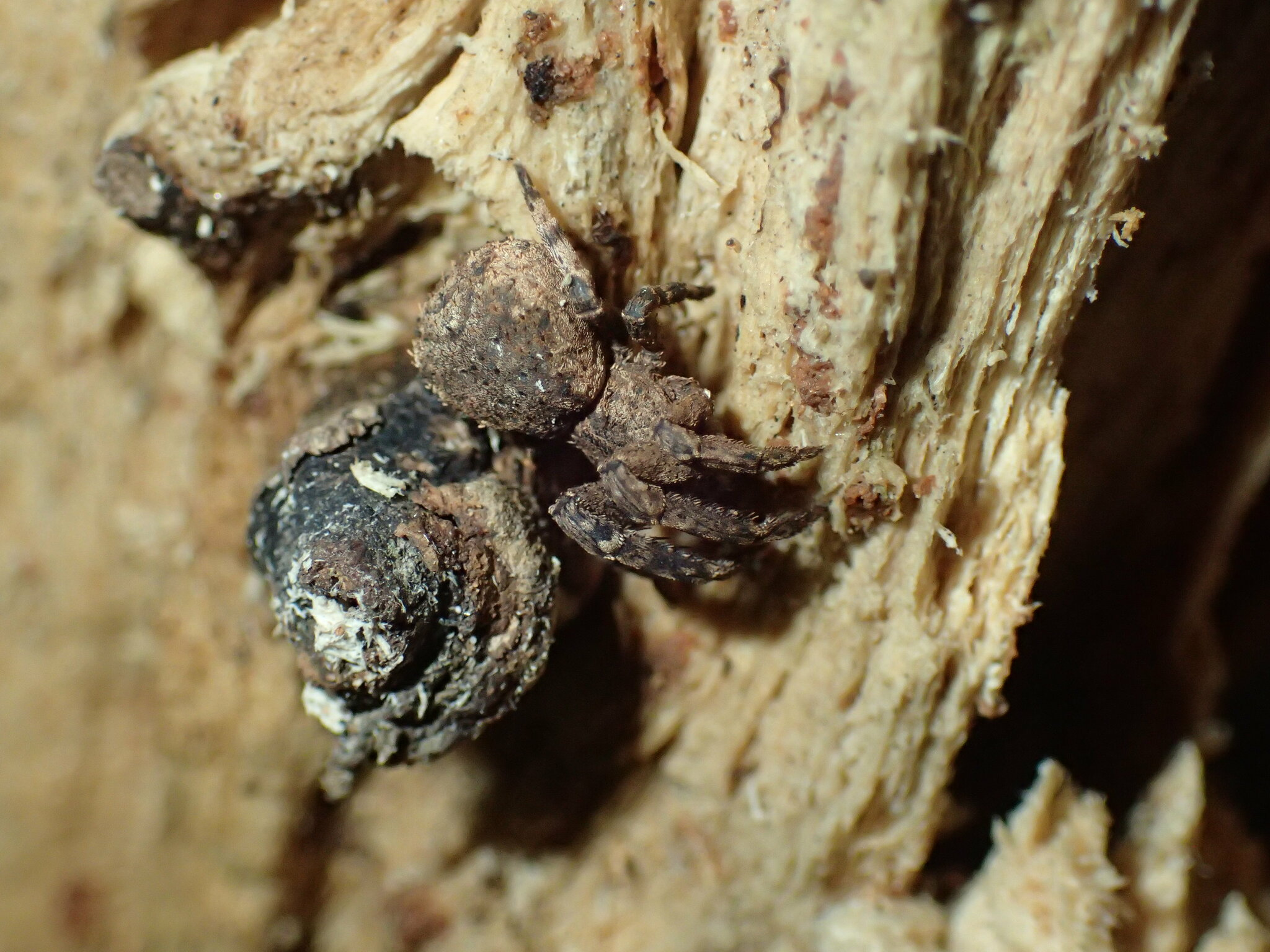
- B. silvicola from South Africa
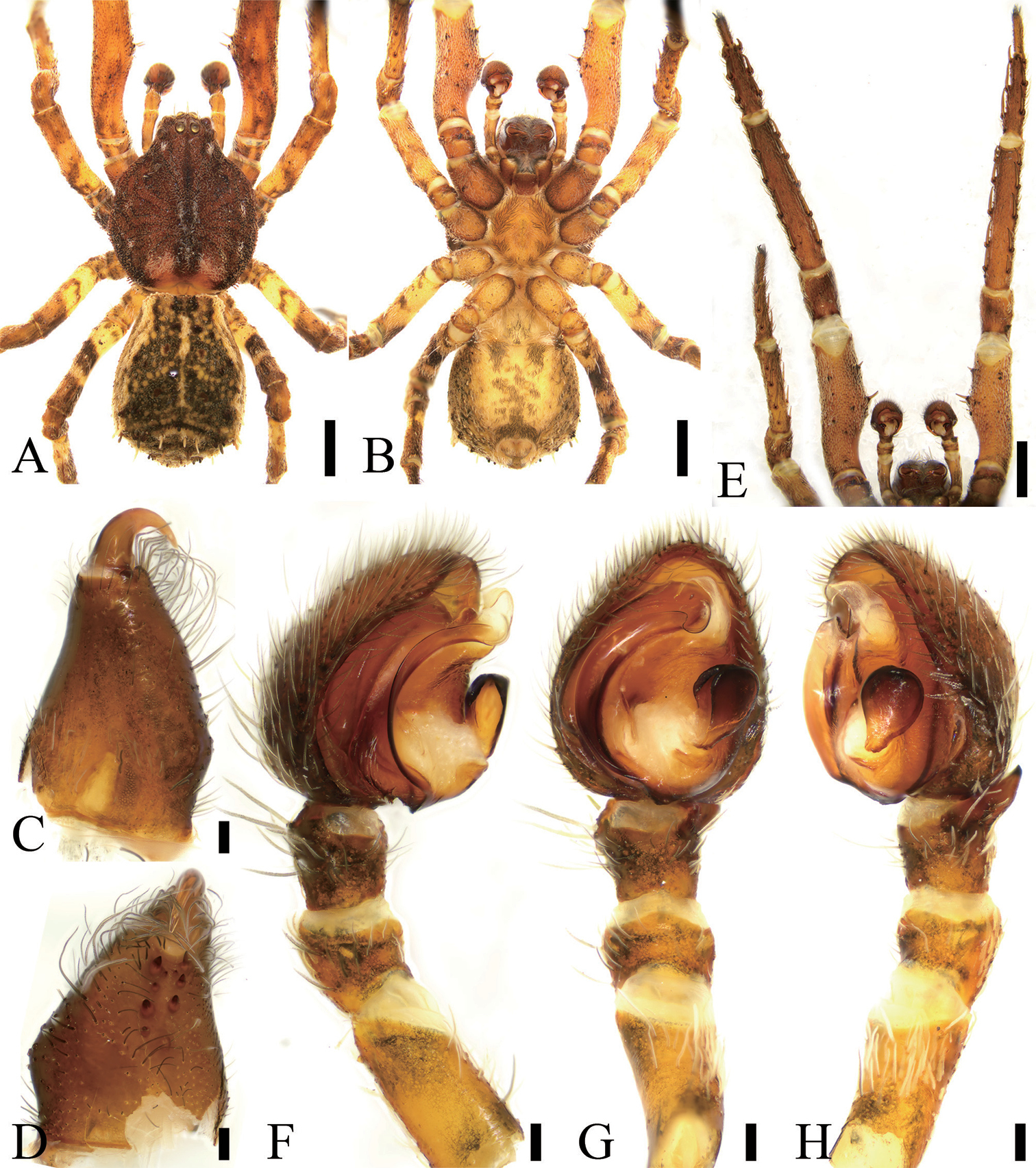
- B. jiangyong diagnostic images

Scientific classification
- Kingdom: Animalia
- Phylum: Arthropoda
- Subphylum: Chelicerata
- Class: Arachnida
- Order: Araneae
- Infraorder: Araneomorphae
- Family: Thomisidae
- Genus: Borboropactus; Simon, 1884

Type species
- B. squalidus Simon, 1884

Species
- 19, see text

= Borboropactus =

Genus of spiders

Borboropactus is a genus of crab spiders that was first described by Eugène Simon in 1884.

== Distribution ==
Species in this genus are found in Africa, Asia, and Papua New Guinea:

== Life style ==
Spiders in this genus are free-living ground dwellers. They are found under logs among decaying leaves in damp areas. Due to the club-shaped setae covering their body, specimens are frequently covered with mud and sand particles adhering to the setae.

== Description ==
Females and males are 7 to 8 mm in total length. The carapace is narrower in the eye region with a longitudinal fovea. The abdomen is roundish with coriaceus integument covered with scales and club-shaped setae.

The legs have thick and inflated femora, with thick tibiae and metatarsi bearing long setae in a double row below. The front legs are directed to the front and not sideways. These spiders are recognised by legs I and II that are very thick.

== Species ==
As of October 2025, this genus includes nineteen species:

- Borboropactus asper (O. Pickard-Cambridge, 1884) – Sri Lanka
- Borboropactus australis (Lawrence, 1937) – South Africa
- Borboropactus bangkongeus Barrion & Litsinger, 1995 – Philippines (Luzon)
- Borboropactus biprocessus Tang, Yin & Peng, 2012 – China
- Borboropactus brevidens Tang & Li, 2010 – China
- Borboropactus cinerascens (Doleschall, 1859) – India (Nicobar Is.), China, Thailand, Malaysia (peninsula, Borneo), Singapore, Philippines, Indonesia (Sumatra, Borneo, Java, Moluccas, New Guinea), Papua New Guinea
- Borboropactus edentatus Tang & Li, 2010 – China
- Borboropactus elephantus (Tikader, 1966) – India
- Borboropactus gialong Benjamin, 2024 – Vietnam
- Borboropactus javanicola (Strand, 1913) – Indonesia (Java)
- Borboropactus jiangyong Yin, Peng, Yan & Kim, 2004 – China
- Borboropactus longidens Tang & Li, 2010 – China (Hainan), Vietnam
- Borboropactus nanda Lin & Li, 2023 – China
- Borboropactus noditarsis (Simon, 1903) – West Africa
- Borboropactus nyerere Benjamin, 2011 – Tanzania
- Borboropactus palaniensis Benjamin, 2024 – India
- Borboropactus silvicola (Lawrence, 1938) – South Africa
- Borboropactus squalidus Simon, 1884 – Zambia, South Africa (type species)
- Borboropactus vulcanicus (Doleschall, 1859) – Indonesia (Java)

In synonymy:

- B. bangkongeus Barrion & Litsinger, 1995 = Borboropactus cinerascens (Doleschall, 1859)
- B. divergens (Hogg, 1914) = Borboropactus bituberculatus Simon, 1884
- B. hainanus Song, 1993 = Borboropactus bituberculatus Simon, 1884
- B. mindoroensis Barrion & Litsinger, 1995 = Borboropactus cinerascens (Doleschall, 1859)
- B. umaasaeus Barrion & Litsinger, 1995 = Borboropactus cinerascens (Doleschall, 1859)

Nomen dubium

- B. cinerascens (Strand, 1907

== See also ==
- List of Thomisidae species
