= Dieta =

Dieta may refer to:

- Spider genus Oxytate (synonym)
- Diet (assembly)
