= Grass crab spider =

Grass crab spider may refer to:

- Oxytate
- Runcinia
