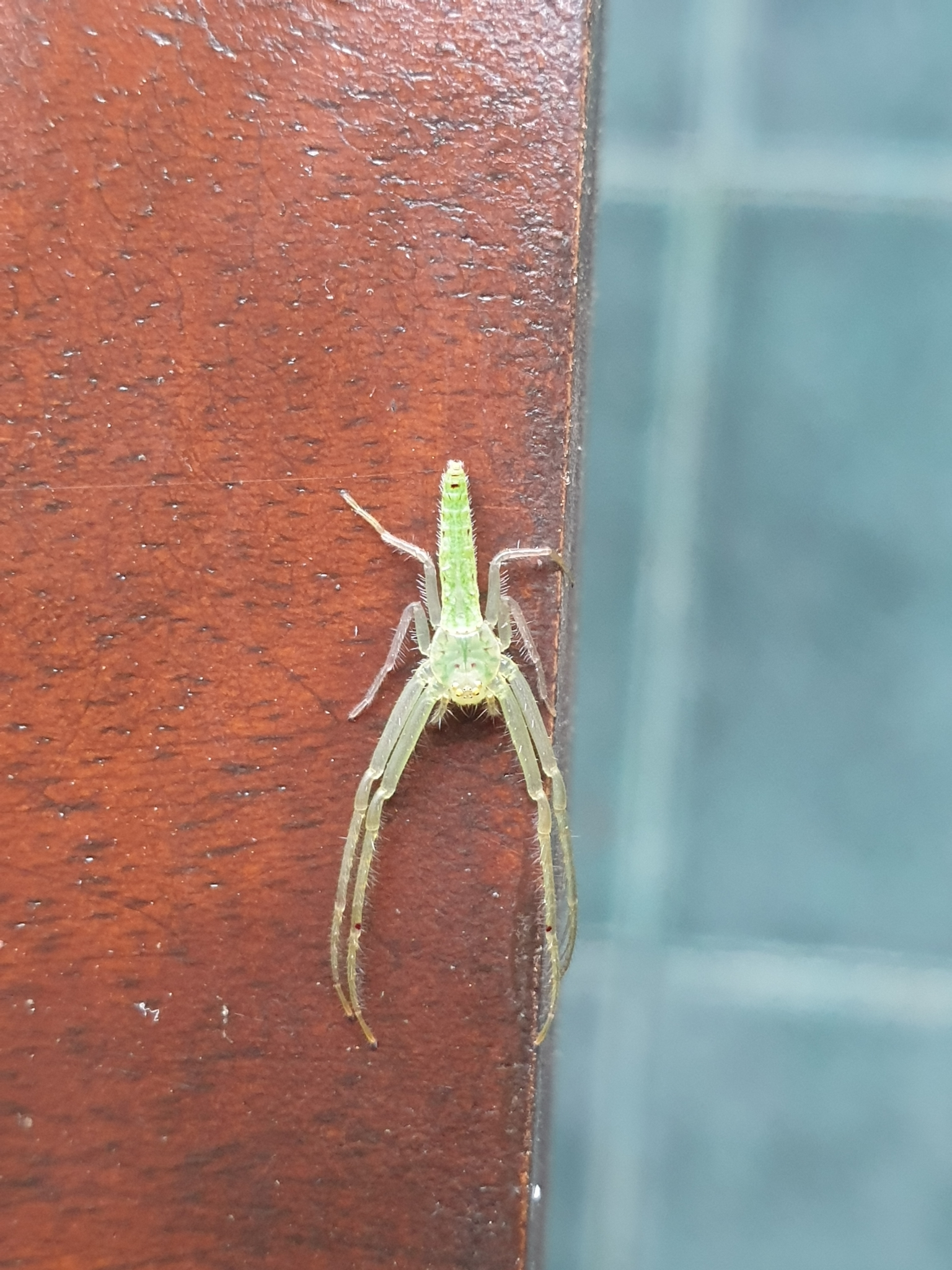

Scientific classification
- Kingdom: Animalia
- Phylum: Arthropoda
- Subphylum: Chelicerata
- Class: Arachnida
- Order: Araneae
- Infraorder: Araneomorphae
- Family: Thomisidae
- Genus: Oxytate
- Species: O. subvirens

Binomial name
- Oxytate subvirens (Strand, 1907)

Synonyms
- Dieta subvirens Strand, 1907

= Oxytate subvirens =

Species of spider

Oxytate subvirens, is a species of spider in the genus Oxytate. It is native to India and Sri Lanka.
