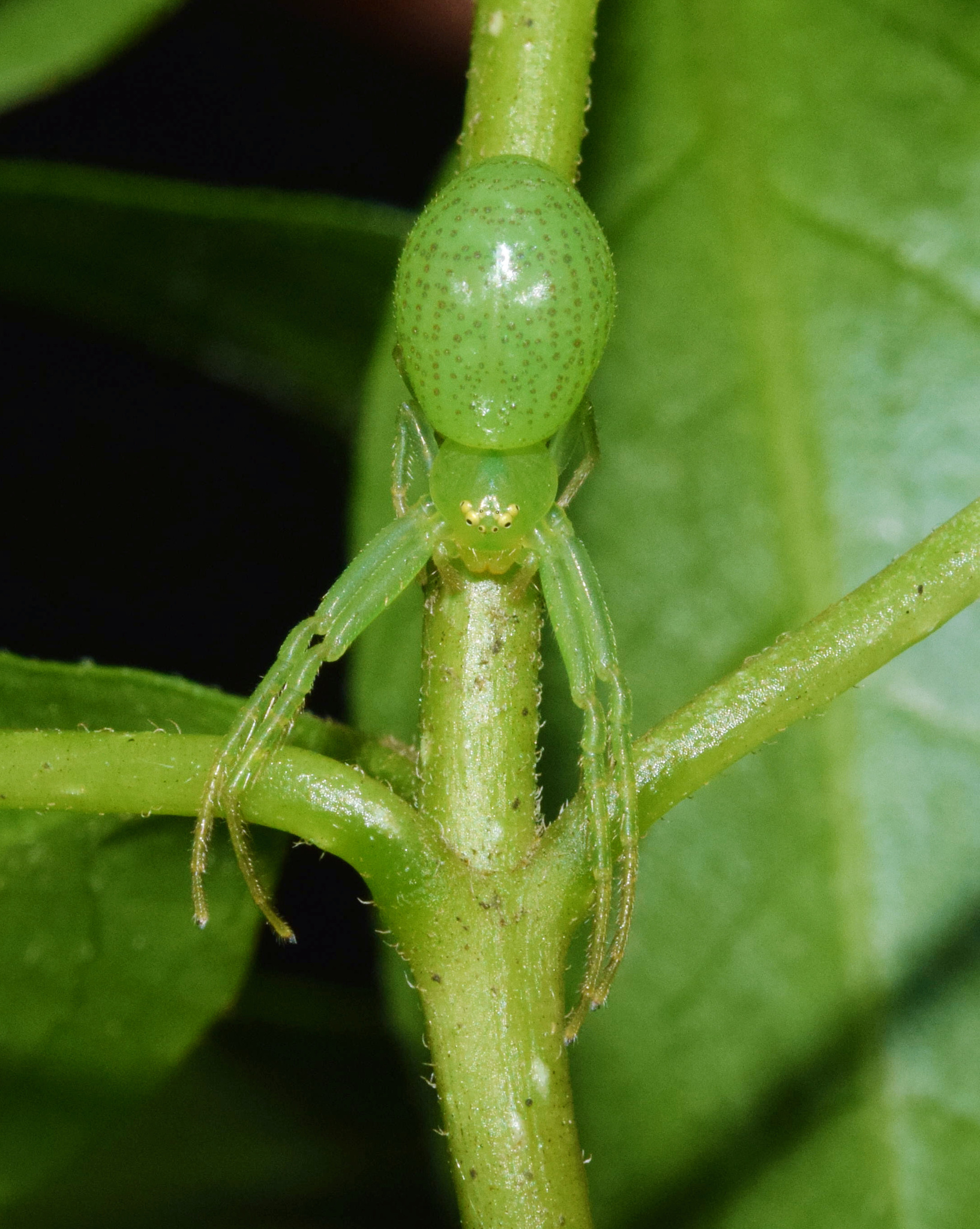

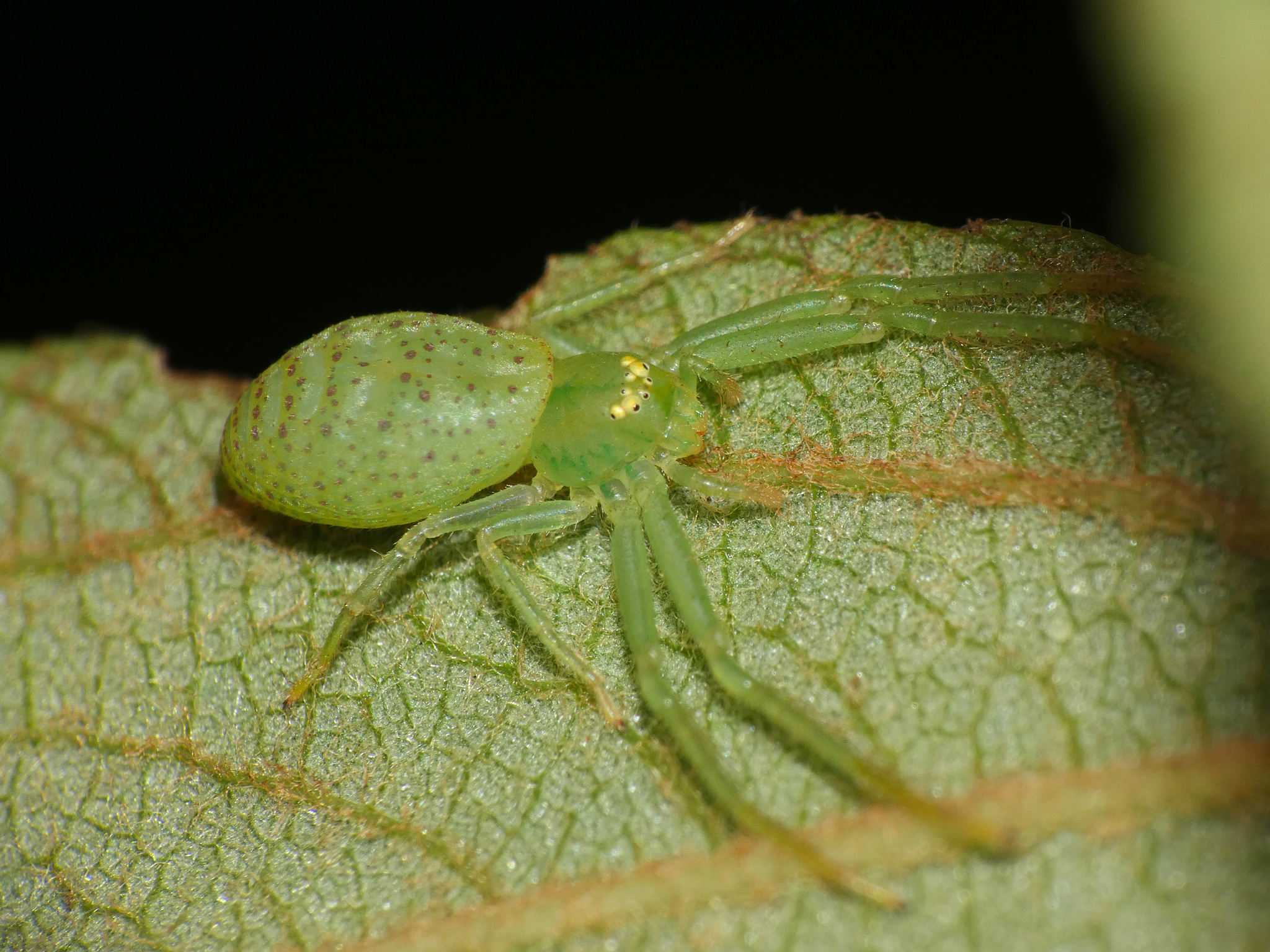

Scientific classification
- Kingdom: Animalia
- Phylum: Arthropoda
- Subphylum: Chelicerata
- Class: Arachnida
- Order: Araneae
- Infraorder: Araneomorphae
- Family: Thomisidae
- Genus: Oxytate
- Species: O. concolor

Binomial name
- Oxytate concolor (Caporiacco, 1947)

Synonyms
- Dieta concolor Caporiacco, 1947

= Oxytate concolor =

Species of spider

Oxytate concolor is a spider in the family Thomisidae. It is found in Ethiopia, South Africa, and Lesotho.

== Distribution ==
Oxytate concolor is found in Ethiopia, Lesotho, and South Africa. The species is possibly undersampled and expected to occur in more African countries.

In South Africa, it is known from Eastern Cape, Gauteng, KwaZulu-Natal, Limpopo, Mpumalanga, and Western Cape provinces.

== Habitat and ecology ==
Oxytate concolor are free-living tree dwellers sampled from Fynbos, Grassland, and Savanna biomes at altitudes ranging from 2 to 1703 m.

The species has also been sampled from avocado, citrus, and macadamia nut orchards.

== Description ==
The body has an oval abdomen that is not as narrow as in other Oxytate species.

== Conservation ==
Oxytate concolor is listed as Least Concern by the South African National Biodiversity Institute due to its wide geographical range. The species is protected in four protected areas and faces no significant threats.

== Taxonomy ==
Oxytate concolor was originally described by Caporiacco in 1947 as Dieta concolor from Ethiopia. The species has not been revised and is known only from the female.
