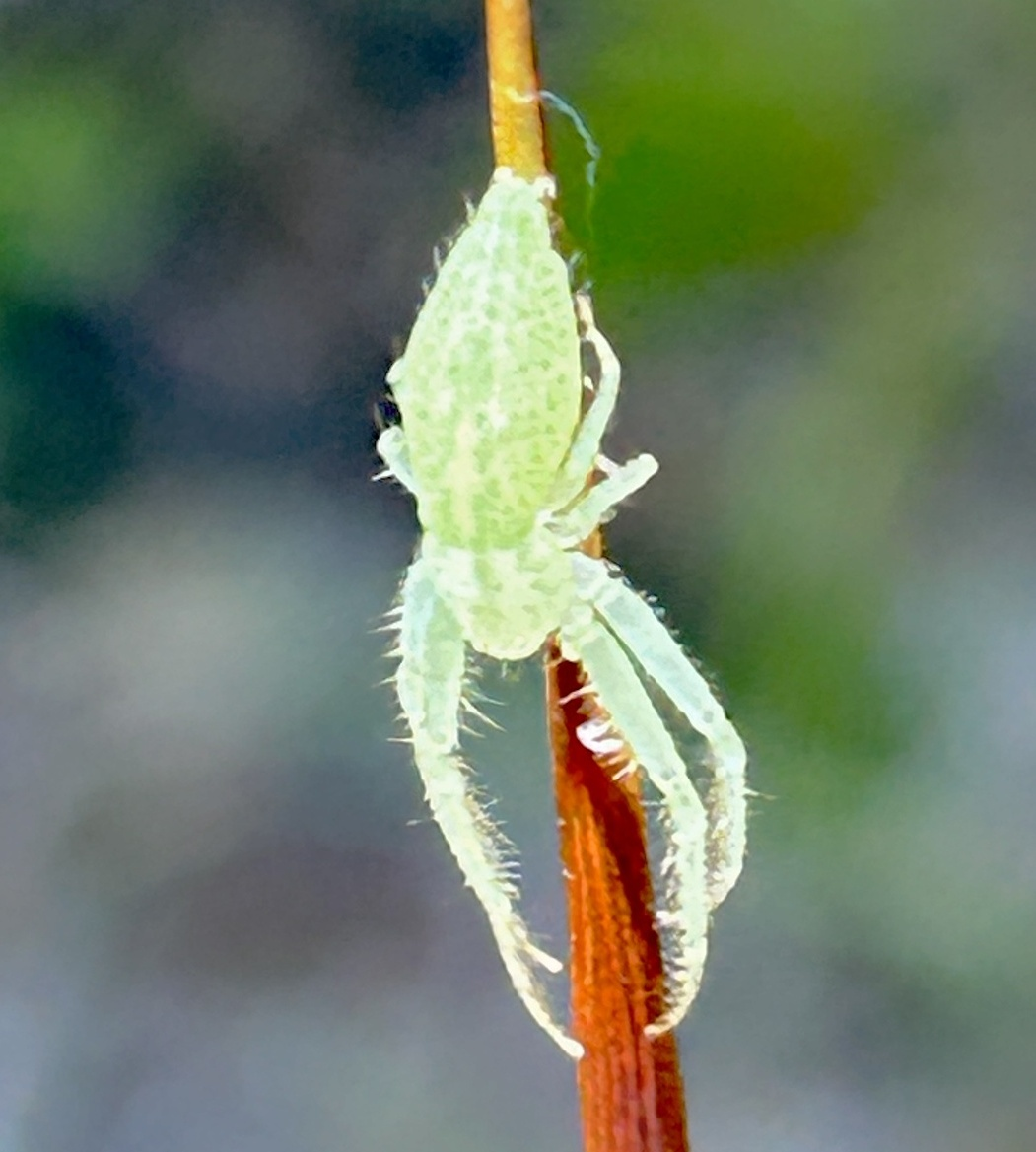

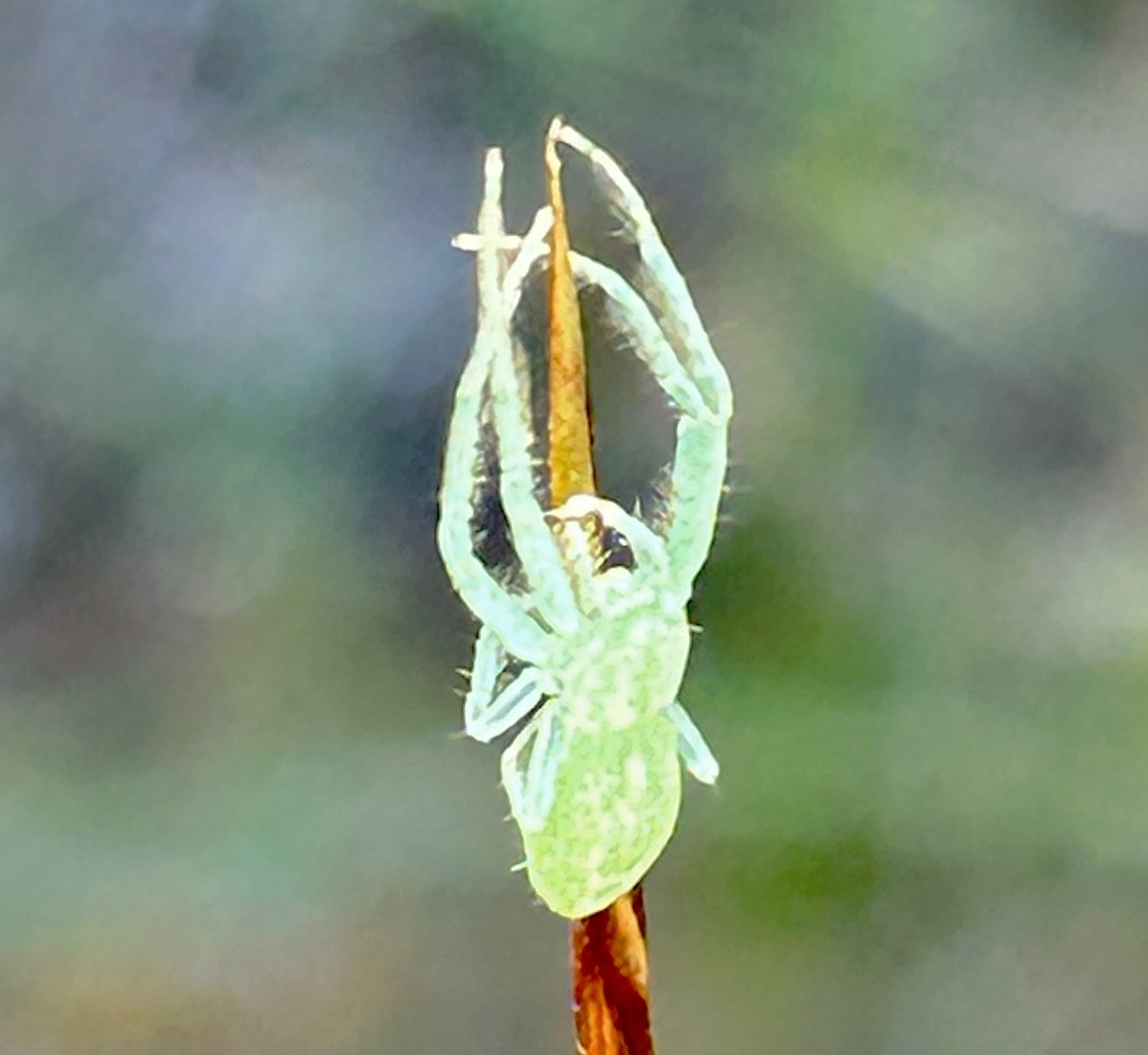

Scientific classification
- Kingdom: Animalia
- Phylum: Arthropoda
- Subphylum: Chelicerata
- Class: Arachnida
- Order: Araneae
- Infraorder: Araneomorphae
- Family: Thomisidae
- Genus: Oxytate
- Species: O. leruthi

Binomial name
- Oxytate leruthi (Lessert, 1943)

Synonyms
- Dieta leruthi Lessert, 1943

= Oxytate leruthi =

Leruthi's Oxytate Crab Spider

Species of spider

Oxytate leruthi is a spider in the family Thomisidae. It is found in several African countries and is commonly known as Leruthi's Oxytate crab spider.

== Distribution ==
Oxytate leruthi is found in Ivory Coast, Ghana, the Democratic Republic of the Congo, Malawi, and South Africa.

In South Africa, it is presently known from Gauteng, Mpumalanga, North West, and Western Cape provinces.

== Habitat and ecology ==
Oxytate leruthi are free-living tree dwellers that have been sampled from Grassland, Savanna, and Fynbos biomes at altitudes ranging from 85 to 1558 m.

== Description ==
The abdomen is long and narrow but does not extend past the spinnerets. The retrolateral tibial apophysis of the male is slender.

== Conservation ==
Oxytate leruthi is listed as Least Concern by the South African National Biodiversity Institute due to its wide geographical range. The species is recorded in the Swartberg Nature Reserve. Due to its wide range, no conservation actions are recommended and there are no significant threats.

== Taxonomy ==
Oxytate leruthi was originally described by Lessert in 1943 as Dieta leruthi from the Democratic Republic of the Congo. The species have been sampled from several countries in West, Central, and South Africa. It has not been revised but is known from both sexes and is illustrated.
