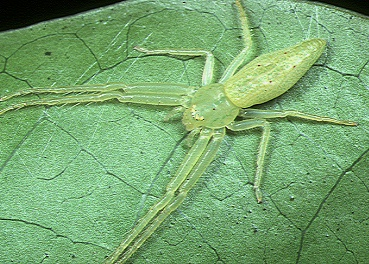
- female from Okinawa
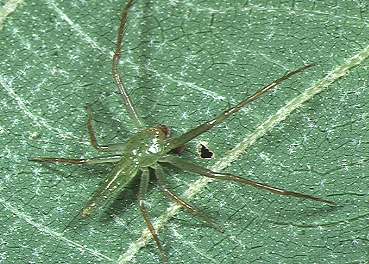
- male from Okinawa

Scientific classification
- Kingdom: Animalia
- Phylum: Arthropoda
- Subphylum: Chelicerata
- Class: Arachnida
- Order: Araneae
- Infraorder: Araneomorphae
- Family: Thomisidae
- Genus: Oxytate
- Species: O. hoshizuna

Binomial name
- Oxytate hoshizuna Ono, 1978

= Oxytate hoshizuna =

Okinawa's Green Crab Spider

Species of spider

Oxytate hoshizuna is a species of spider in the family Thomisidae (crab spiders). It is found in China and Japan.

== Etymology ==
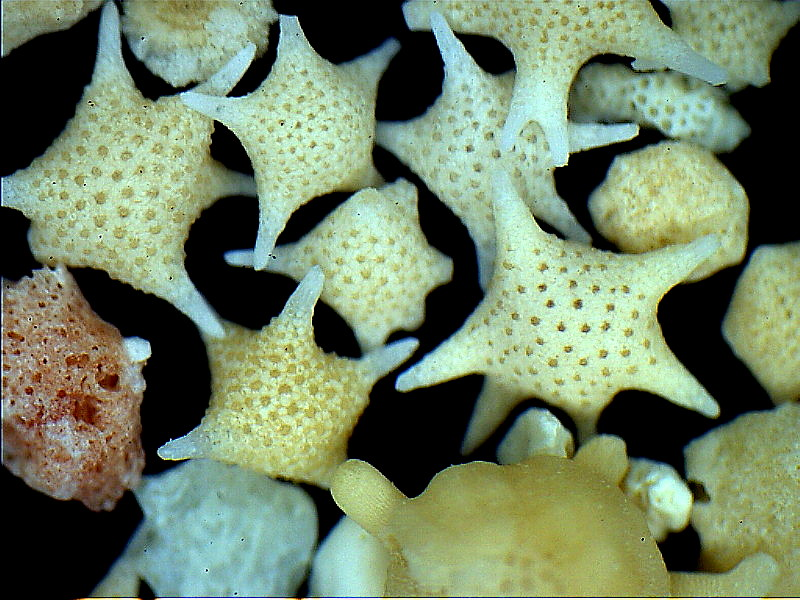
Star sand made up of Foraminifera from Okinawa

The specific name hoshizuna is derived from the Japanese words hoshi (星 "star") and zuna (砂 "sand"), literally translating to "star sand". This name references the famous star-shaped sand found on beaches in Okinawa Prefecture, Japan, where the species was first collected.

== Distribution ==
O. hoshizuna has been recorded from China and Japan. The original specimens were collected from the Ryukyu Islands in Japan, specifically from Iriomote Island in Okinawa Prefecture. The species has subsequently been reported from various regions of China.

== Description ==
The original description by Ono (1978) provides detailed morphological measurements for both male and female specimens. Males have a body length of 3.0-3.7 mm, while females are slightly larger at 3.2-3.7 mm. The species exhibits the characteristic features of the genus Oxytate, including relatively long anterior legs adapted for ambush predation.

In life, males appear bright green without distinct markings. When preserved in alcohol, both the prosoma and opisthosoma become dorsally pale, and the legs turn yellowish-brown, while the sternum and ventral opisthosoma appear yellowish-white. Females are similarly green in life and become yellowish-white when preserved in alcohol.
