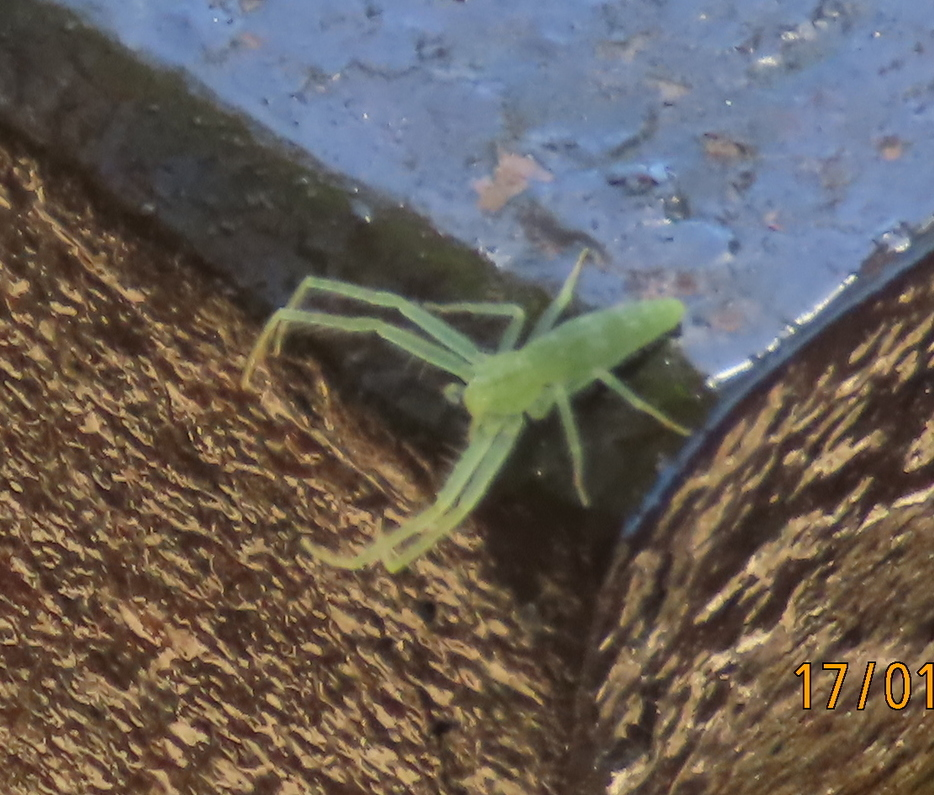

Scientific classification
- Kingdom: Animalia
- Phylum: Arthropoda
- Subphylum: Chelicerata
- Class: Arachnida
- Order: Araneae
- Infraorder: Araneomorphae
- Family: Thomisidae
- Genus: Oxytate
- Species: O. ribes

Binomial name
- Oxytate ribes (Jézéquel, 1964)

Synonyms
- Dieta ribes Jézéquel, 1964

= Oxytate ribes =

Tailed Oxytate Crab Spider

Species of spider

Oxytate ribes is a spider in the family Thomisidae. It is found in the Ivory Coast and South Africa, and is commonly known as the tailed Oxytate crab spider.

== Distribution ==
Oxytate ribes is found in Ivory Coast and South Africa. The species is undersampled and expected to occur in more African countries.

In South Africa, it is known from Eastern Cape, Gauteng, KwaZulu-Natal, Limpopo, and Western Cape provinces.

== Habitat and ecology ==
Oxytate ribes are free-living tree dwellers sampled from Fynbos, Grassland, and Savanna biomes at altitudes ranging from 4 to 1762 m.

== Description ==
The abdomen is long and narrow with the tip slightly extending past the spinnerets. The retrolateral tibial apophysis of the male is robust.

== Conservation ==
Oxytate ribes is listed as Least Concern by the South African National Biodiversity Institute due to its wide geographical range. The species is protected in eight reserves and a national park. There are no significant threats and no conservation actions are recommended.

== Taxonomy ==
Oxytate ribes was originally described by Jézéquel in 1964 as Dieta ribes from the Ivory Coast. The species has not been revised but is known from both sexes.
