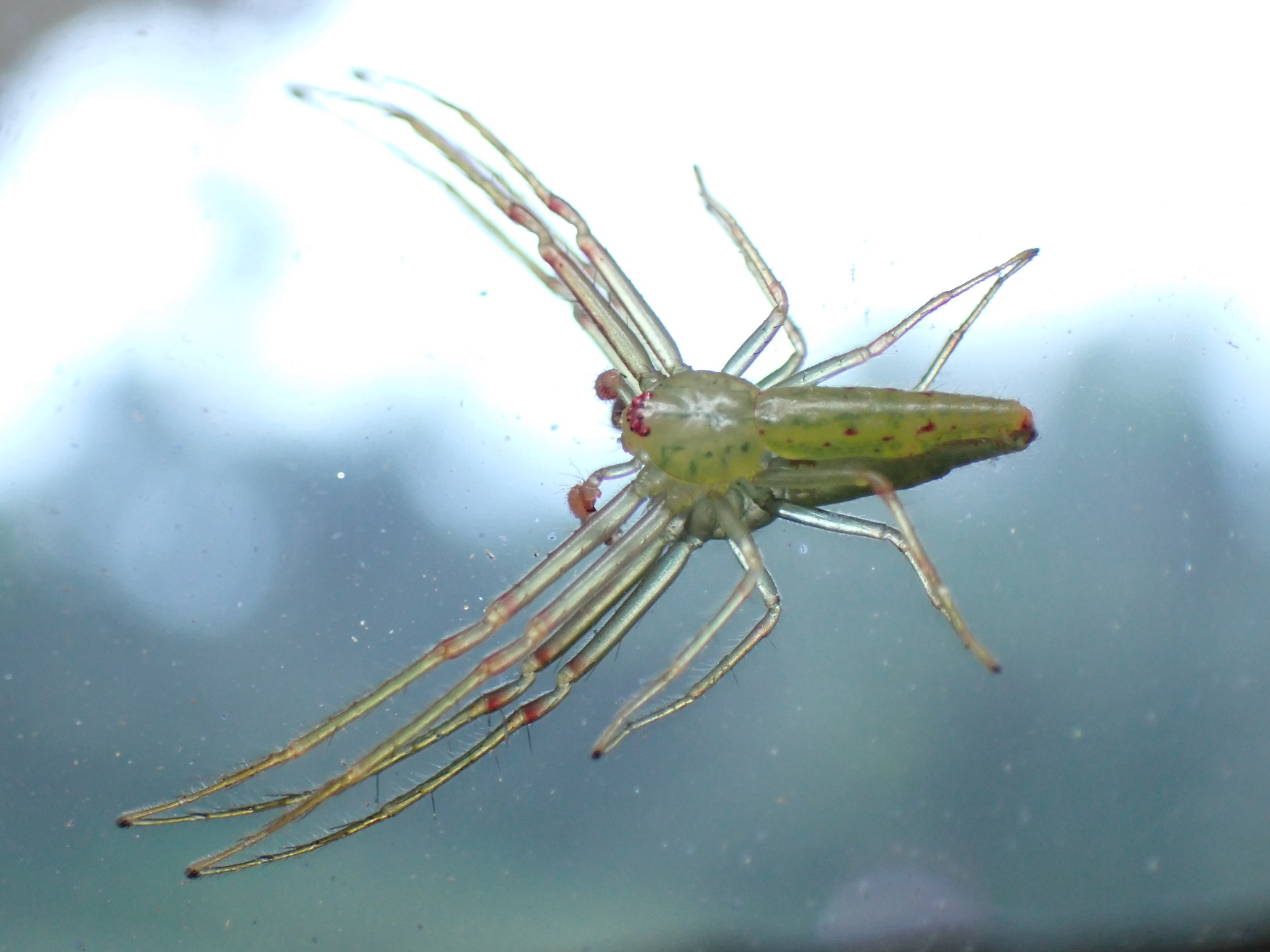
- male from India

Scientific classification
- Kingdom: Animalia
- Phylum: Arthropoda
- Subphylum: Chelicerata
- Class: Arachnida
- Order: Araneae
- Infraorder: Araneomorphae
- Family: Thomisidae
- Genus: Oxytate
- Species: O. bhutanica

Binomial name
- Oxytate bhutanica Ono, 2001

= Oxytate bhutanica =

Species of spider

Oxytate bhutanica is a species of crab spider in the family Thomisidae. It was first described from Bhutan in 2001 and is also found in China.

== Etymology ==
The specific epithet bhutanica was derived from the name of the country Bhutan, where the species was first discovered.

== Distribution ==
O. bhutanica is known from Bhutan and China. In Bhutan, it has been recorded from various locations including areas northeast of Phuntsholing in evergreen forests with oak trees at altitudes of 1,700 m, east of Wangdi Phodrang in evergreen forests at altitudes between 1,700 and 2,000 m, and from Thimphu and Chimakothi in coniferous and broad-leaved forests at altitudes ranging from 1,900 to 2,500 m.

== Habitat ==
The species inhabits evergreen, coniferous, and broad-leaved forests at elevations between 1,700 and 2,500 meters above sea level.

== Description ==
Oxytate bhutanica is a small crab spider with notable sexual dimorphism in size. Females are larger than males, with a body length of 7.80 mm compared to 6.30 mm in males.

The prosoma is flat and longer than wide in both sexes. The eye arrangement follows the typical pattern for thomisids, with the anterior lateral eyes being the largest. The legs show the characteristic crab spider leg formula I-II-IV-III, with the front two pairs of legs being longer and stronger for grasping prey.

Both males and females display similar coloration, with the prosoma being yellow or light yellow without markings. The chelicerae, maxillae, labium and sternum are light yellow or yellowish white, while the palps and legs are light yellowish brown. The opisthosoma is yellowish white or yellow with white spots, and the underside is light yellow.

== Taxonomy ==
Oxytate bhutanica is closely related to Oxytate parallela, which is widely distributed in China, but can be distinguished by differences in the male palpal structure and female genital anatomy. The retrolateral apophysis on the male palpal tibia is wider and stronger in O. bhutanica, and the guide pocket openings in the female genitalia are smaller compared to O. parallela.
