= Oxytate indosinica =

Scientific classification
- Kingdom: Animalia
- Phylum: Arthropoda
- Subphylum: Chelicerata
- Class: Arachnida
- Order: Araneae
- Infraorder: Araneomorphae
- Family: Thomisidae
- Genus: Oxytate
- Species: O. indosinica

Binomial name
- Oxytate indosinica Caleb, 2026

Species of spider

Oxytate indosinica is a species of crab spiders.

== Range ==
This species is currently known from northeastern India and southwestern China, occupying subtropical to montane forest habitats across a broad elevational range (556–1841 m).

== Etymology ==
The name highlights distribution of the new species across India (Manipur) and China (Yunnan) within the Indo-Burma biodiversity hotspot. The epithet is treated as an adjective.
