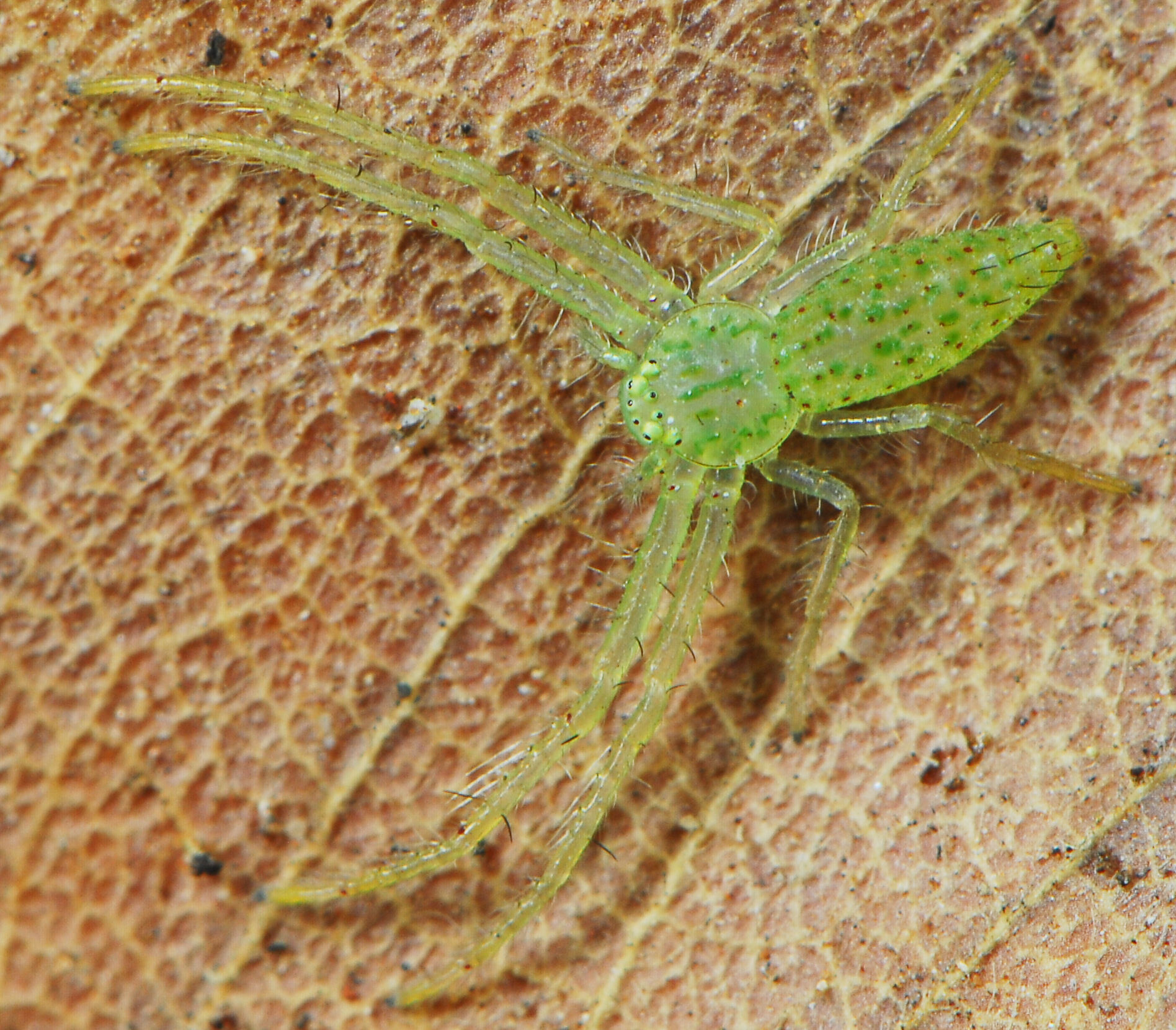
- female
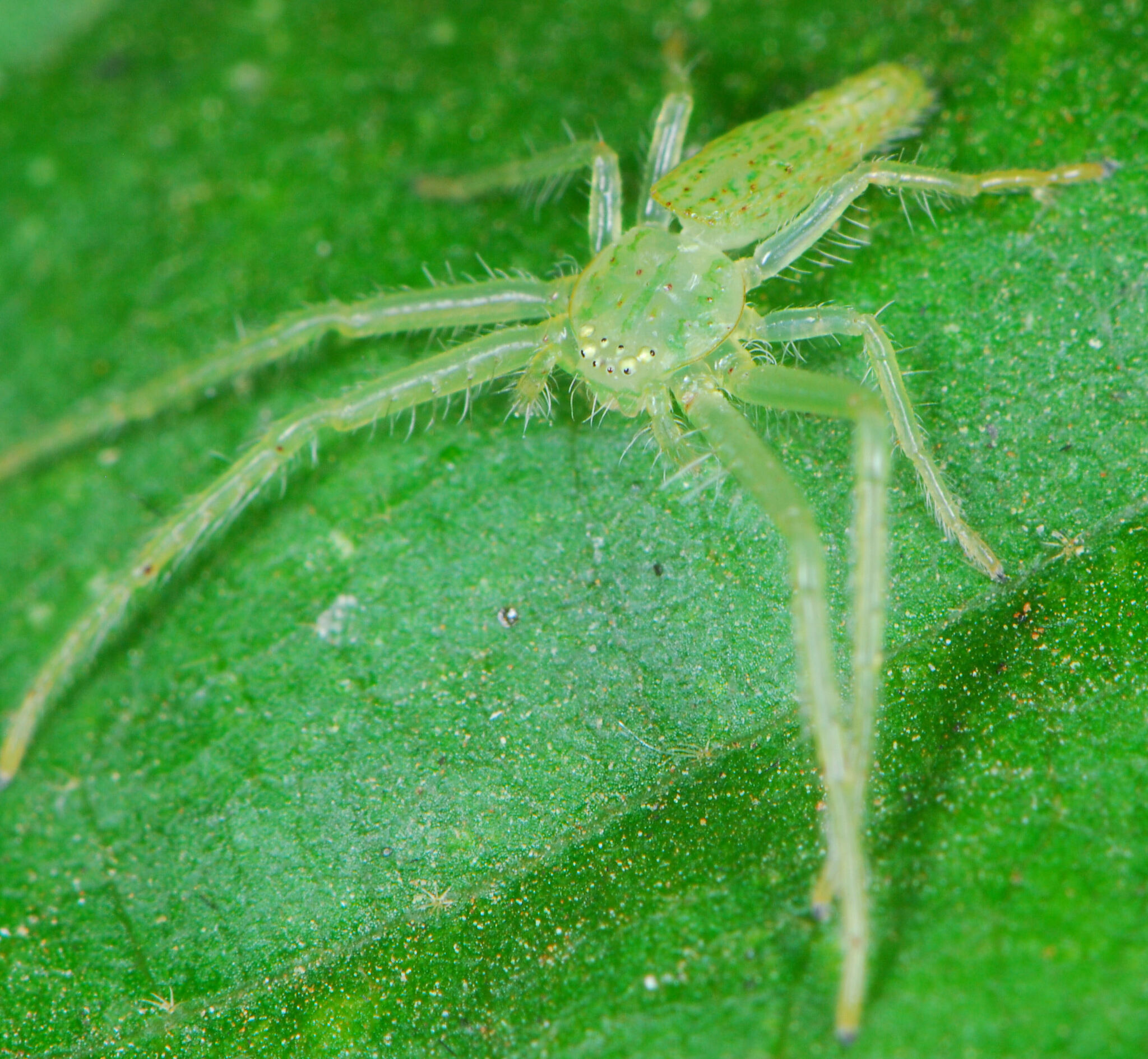
- juvenile female

Scientific classification
- Kingdom: Animalia
- Phylum: Arthropoda
- Subphylum: Chelicerata
- Class: Arachnida
- Order: Araneae
- Infraorder: Araneomorphae
- Family: Thomisidae
- Genus: Oxytate
- Species: O. argenteooculata

Binomial name
- Oxytate argenteooculata (Simon, 1886)

Synonyms
- Dieta argenteo-oculata Simon, 1886

= Oxytate argenteooculata =

Spikey Green Oxytate Crab Spider

Species of spider

Oxytate argenteooculata is a spider in the family Thomisidae. It is found in Central Africa, East Africa, and Southern Africa, and is commonly known as the spikey green Oxytate crab spider.

== Distribution ==
Oxytate argenteooculata is found in the Democratic Republic of the Congo, Tanzania, Zambia, Mozambique, South Africa, and Eswatini.

In South Africa, it has been recorded from Eastern Cape, Free State, Gauteng, KwaZulu-Natal, Limpopo, Mpumalanga, North West, and Western Cape provinces at altitudes ranging from 8 to 1457 m.

== Habitat and ecology ==
Oxytate argenteooculata are free-living tree dwellers sampled from Fynbos, Grassland, Savanna, and Thicket biomes.

The species was sampled during surveys from avocado orchards in Mpumalanga where it was the most abundant species and represented 22.2% of all spiders collected. Individuals were commonly observed on leaves of avocado trees where their green and flattened bodies blend with the foliage. This is the first time that species of Oxytate have been collected in such high numbers from a crop in Africa. The species has also been sampled from citrus, macadamia, and tomato crops.

== Description ==
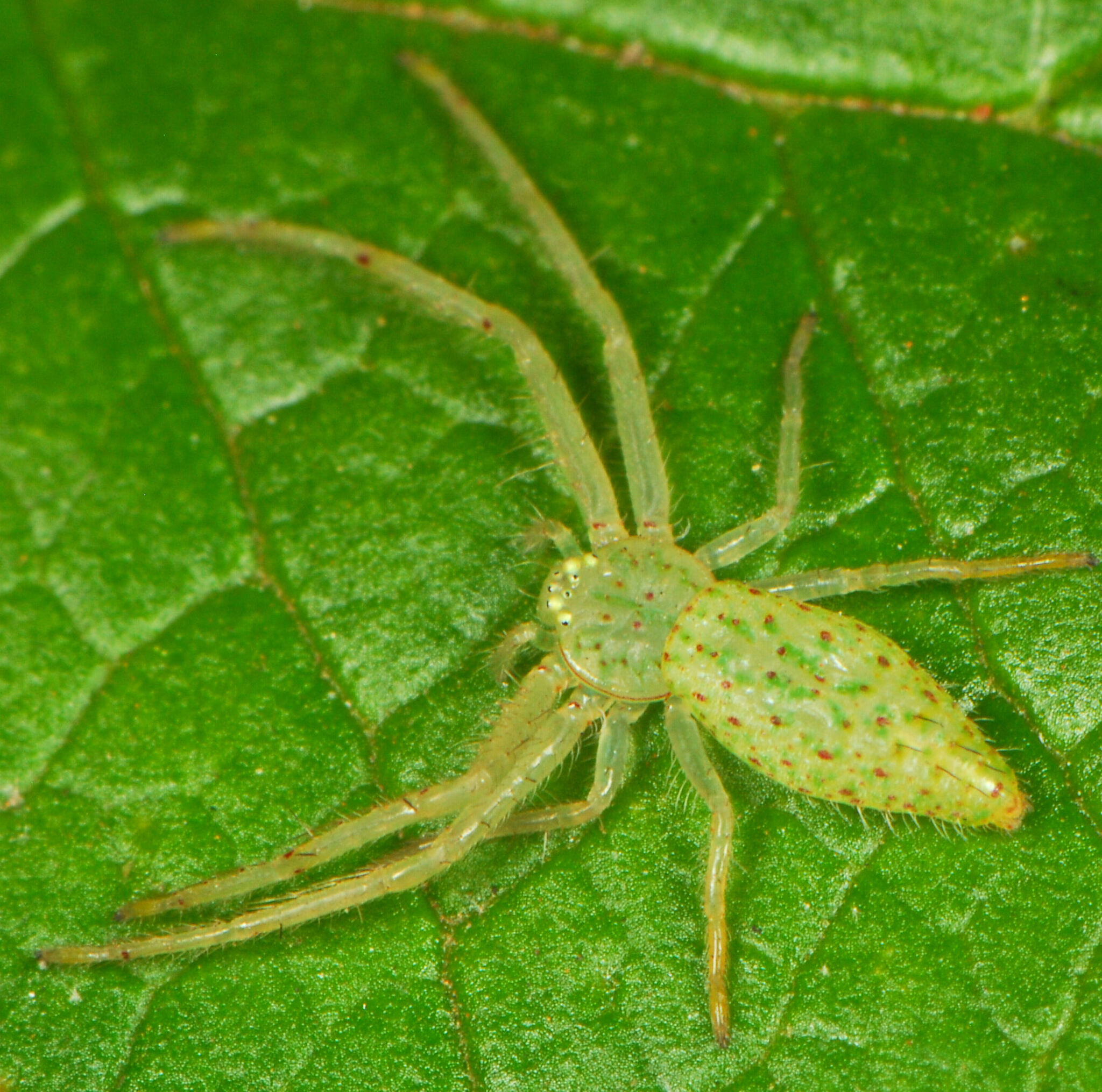
female

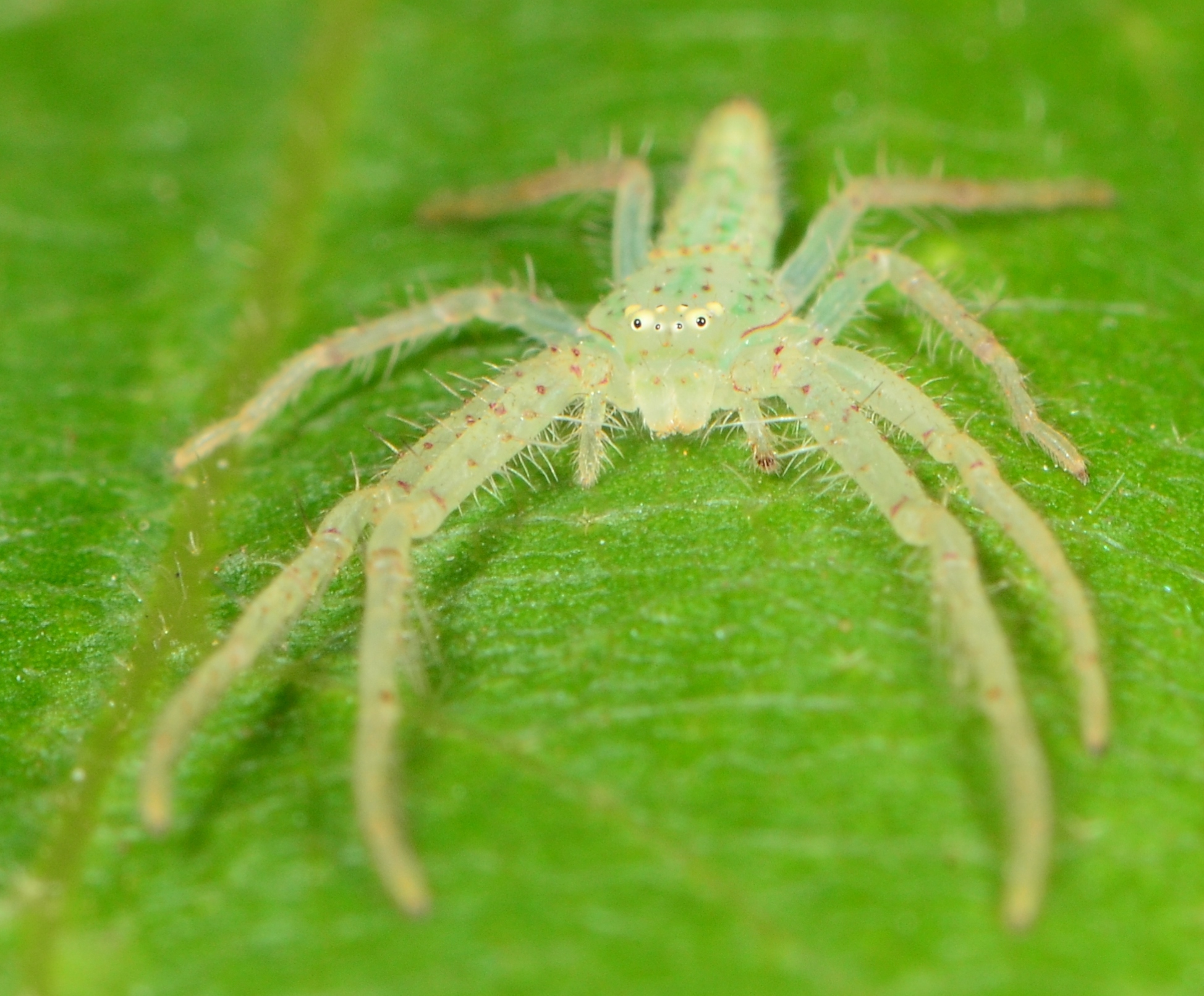
female

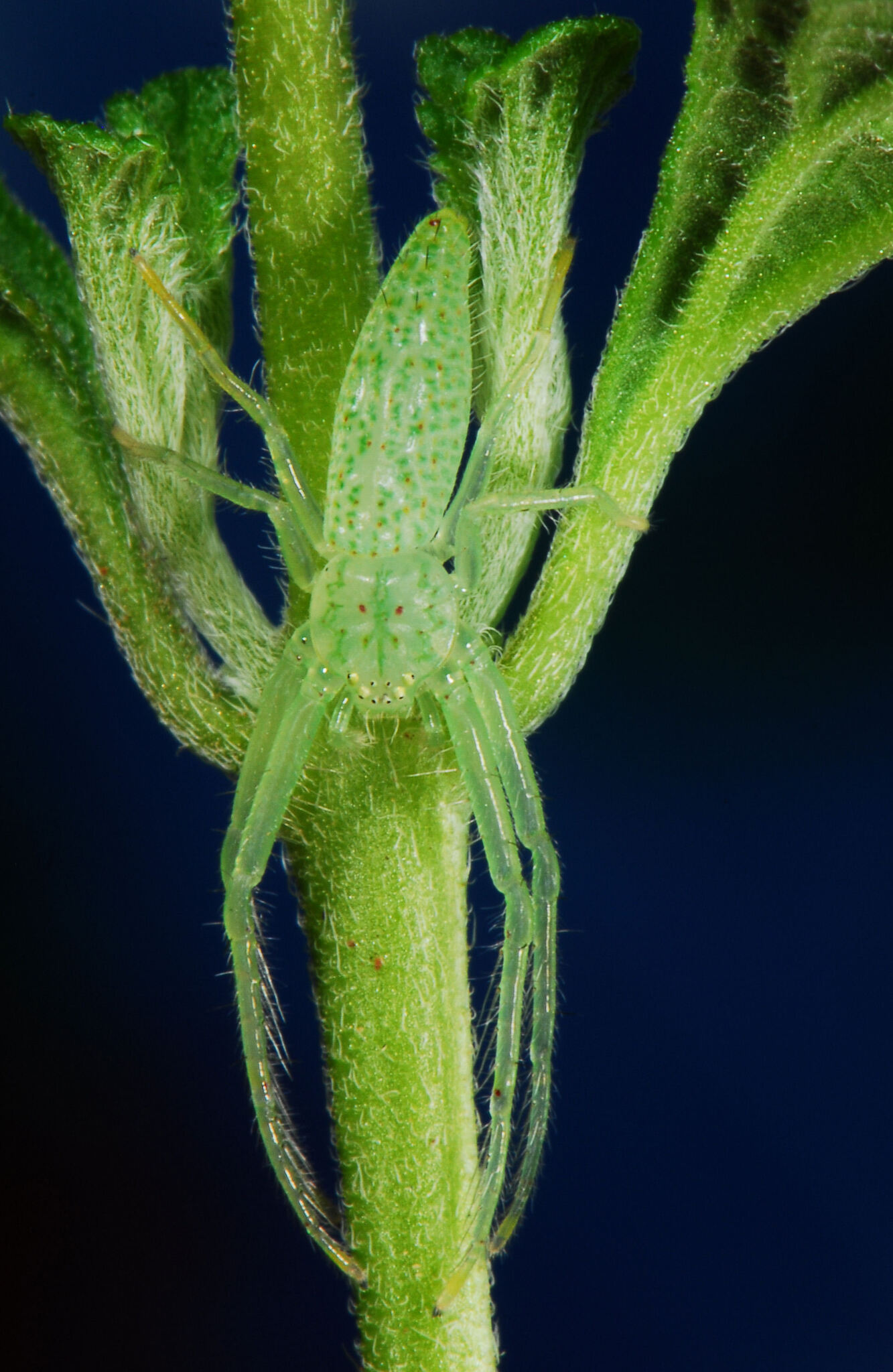
female

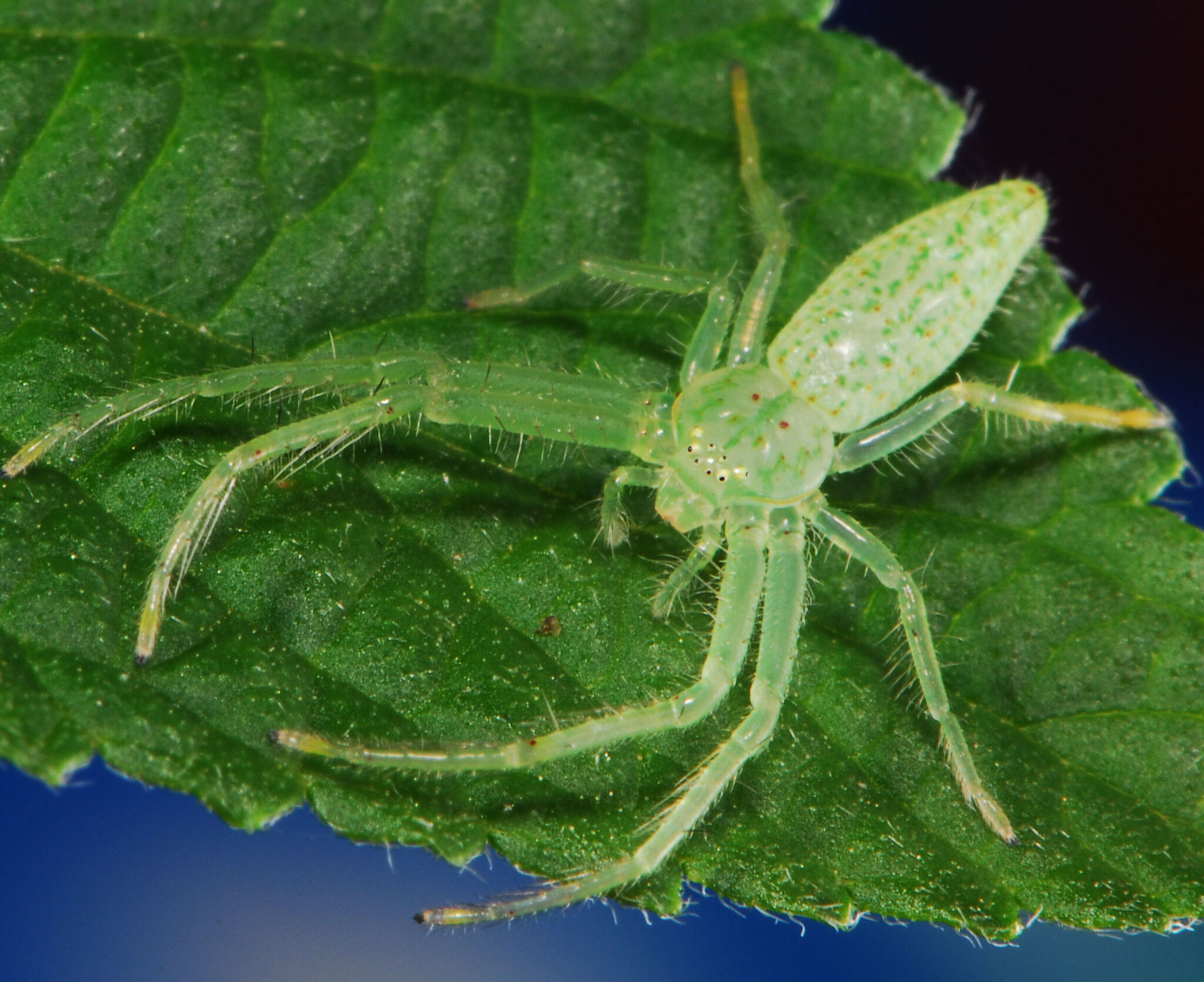
female

The carapace is very flat with two to four red spots on both sides of the fovea. The abdomen has three pairs of long dark setae near the posterior end. The male embolus is long.

== Conservation ==
Oxytate argenteooculata is listed as Least Concern by the South African National Biodiversity Institute due to its wide geographical range. The species is sampled from more than 10 protected areas and faces no significant threats.

== Taxonomy ==
Oxytate argenteooculata was originally described by Eugène Simon in 1886 as Dieta argenteo-oculata from Zanzibar. It has since been sampled from several countries in Central, East, and Southern Africa. The species has not been revised but is known from both sexes and is illustrated.
