= Oxytate taprobane =

Scientific classification
- Kingdom: Animalia
- Phylum: Arthropoda
- Subphylum: Chelicerata
- Class: Arachnida
- Order: Araneae
- Infraorder: Araneomorphae
- Family: Thomisidae
- Genus: Oxytate
- Species: O. taprobane

Binomial name
- Oxytate taprobane Benjamin, 2001

Species of spider

Oxytate taprobane is a species of spider of the genus Oxytate. It is endemic to Sri Lanka.
