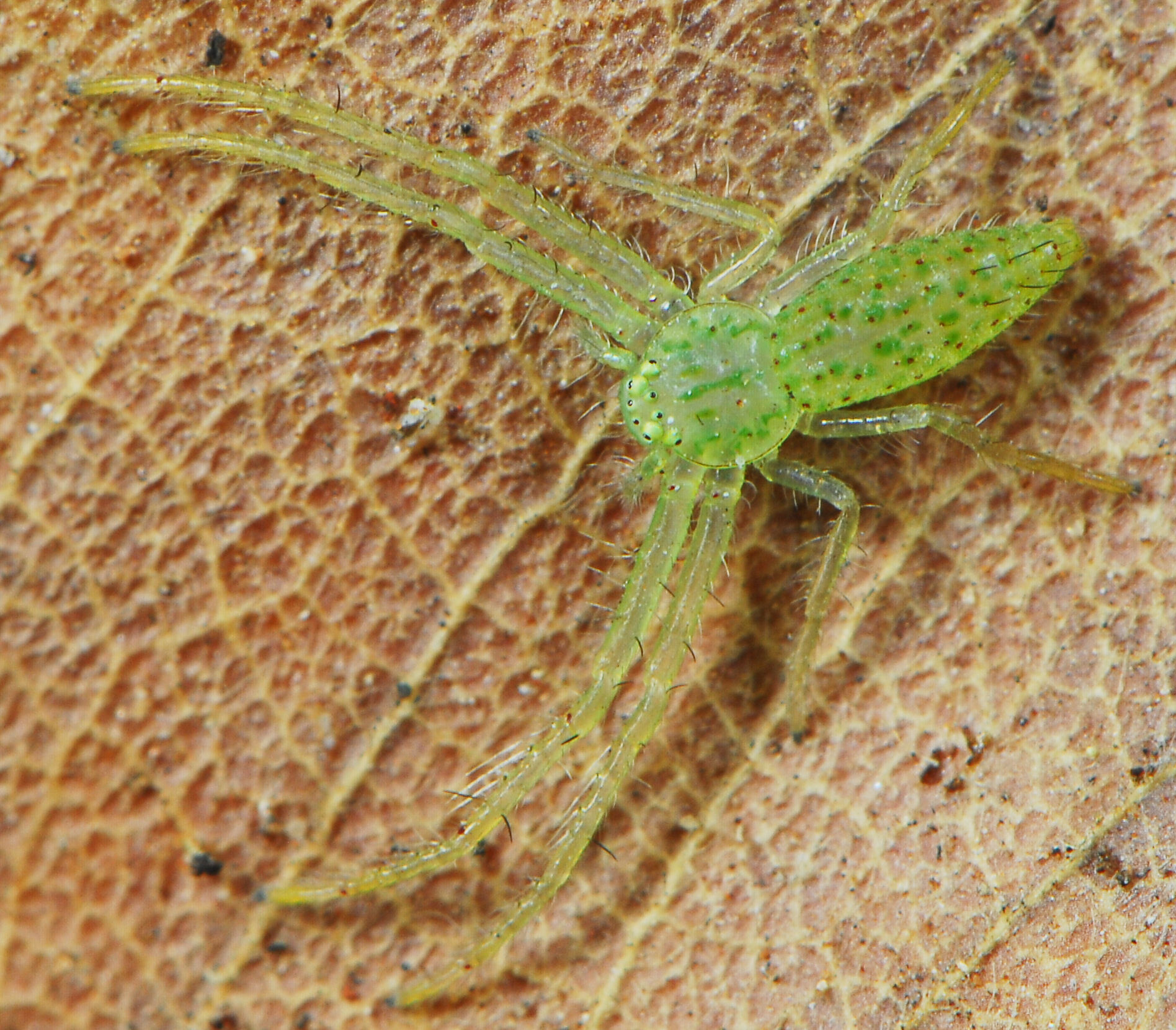
- female O. argenteooculata
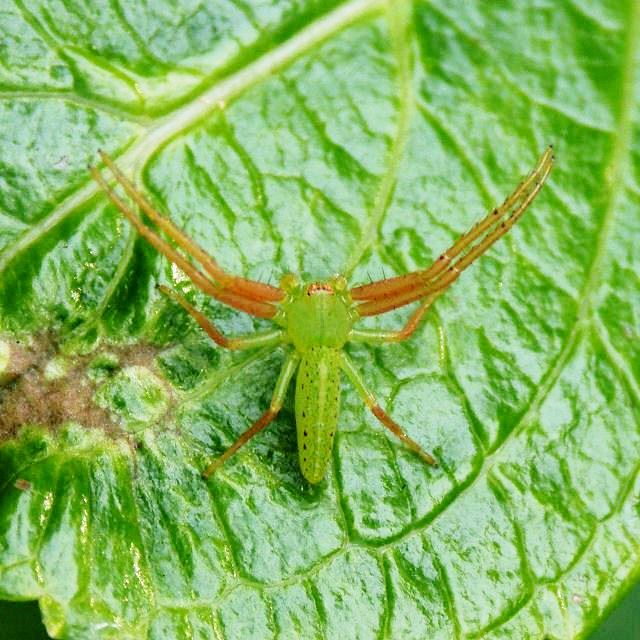
- O. striatipes

Scientific classification
- Kingdom: Animalia
- Phylum: Arthropoda
- Subphylum: Chelicerata
- Class: Arachnida
- Order: Araneae
- Infraorder: Araneomorphae
- Family: Thomisidae
- Genus: Oxytate; L. Koch, 1878

Type species
- Oxytate striatipes L. Koch, 1878

Species
- See text.

Synonyms
- Dieta Simon, 1880; Rhytidura Thorell, 1895

= Oxytate =

Grass crab spiders

Genus of spiders

The genus Oxytate, commonly known as grass crab spiders, comprises a homogenous group of nocturnal crab spiders (family Thomisidae). The complete mitochondrial genome of the type species O. striatipes was determined in 2014.

== Distribution ==
Members of this genus are native to Asia, Western Australia, East, Central and southern Africa.

== Description ==
Although they do not construct webs, both sexes possess a silk apparatus. A study of the type species, O. striatipes, revealed that they possess a simpler and more primitive spigot system than other members of the family, as even the females possess neither tubuliform glands for cocoon production, nor triad spigots for web-building. Males and females do, however, have three types of silk gland, which are classified as ampullate, pyriform and aciniform.

Four ampullate glands are connected to the anterior spinnerets, while eight minor ampullate glands are connected to the median spinnerets. The pyriform glands are connected to the anterior spinnerets (90 in females and 80 in males). The aciniform glands are connected to the median (18–24 in females and 14–20 in males) and posterior spinnerets (60 in either sex).

Green crab spiders help honeybee and plants interact. Oxytate has an ability to reflect UV lights, which makes flowers more attractive to honeybees. Honeybees are attracted and captured in a trap of crab spiders.

== Habits ==
Like other crab spiders, they are masters of ambush and disguise. They stalk their prey at night, from an ambush position on a grass stem or from the underside of a leaf, and are difficult to spot due to their camouflage. They can sense the vibrations caused by invertebrates moving on the leaf's upper side, and quickly pounce on the victim. While in ambush on twigs or grass, the short hind legs hold onto the stem, while the long anterior legs are stretched forward. Their bite is not harmful to humans, but can possibly cause an allergic reaction.

== Species ==
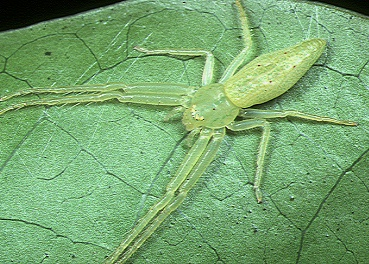
female O. hoshizuna

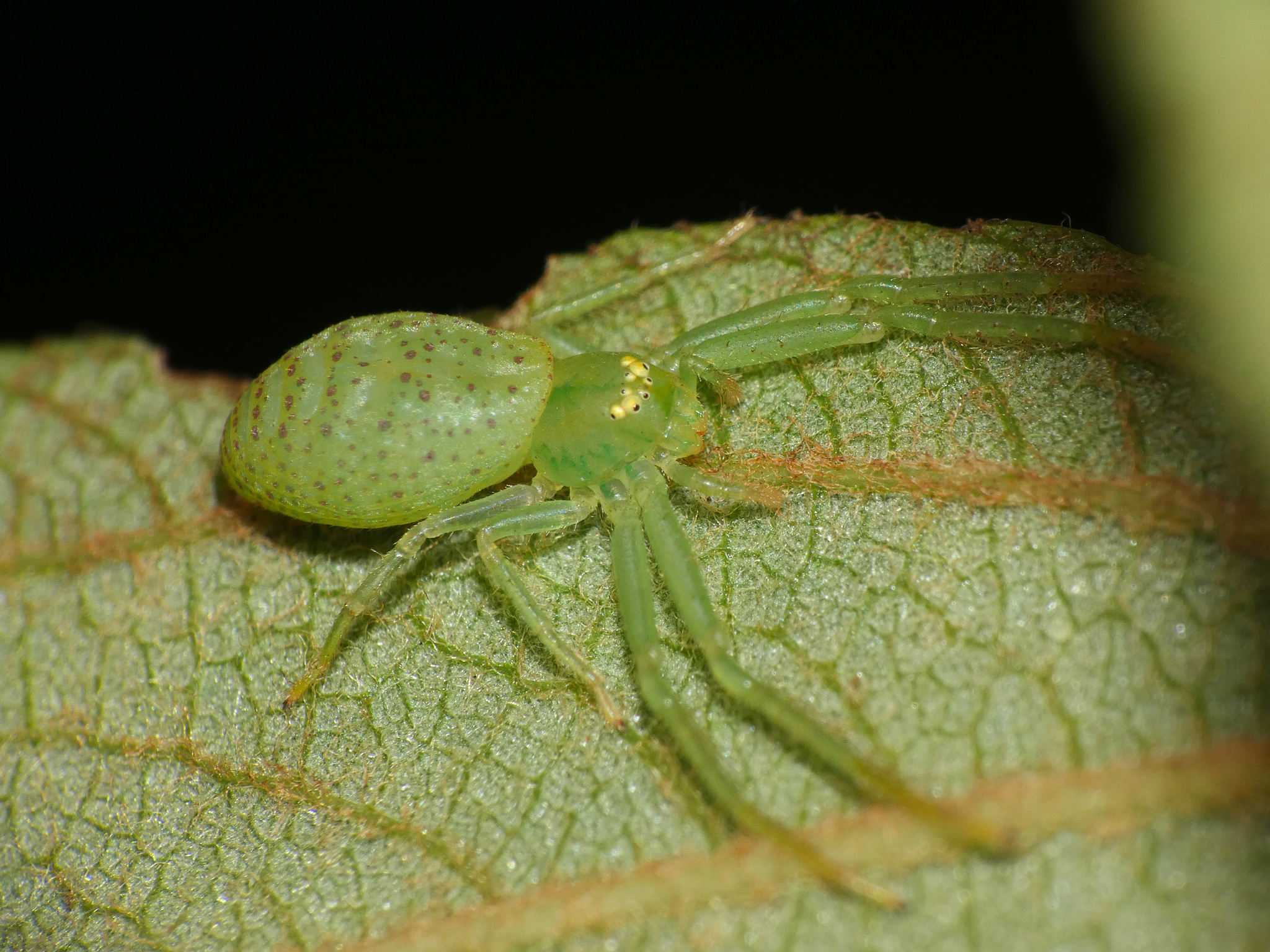
O. concolor

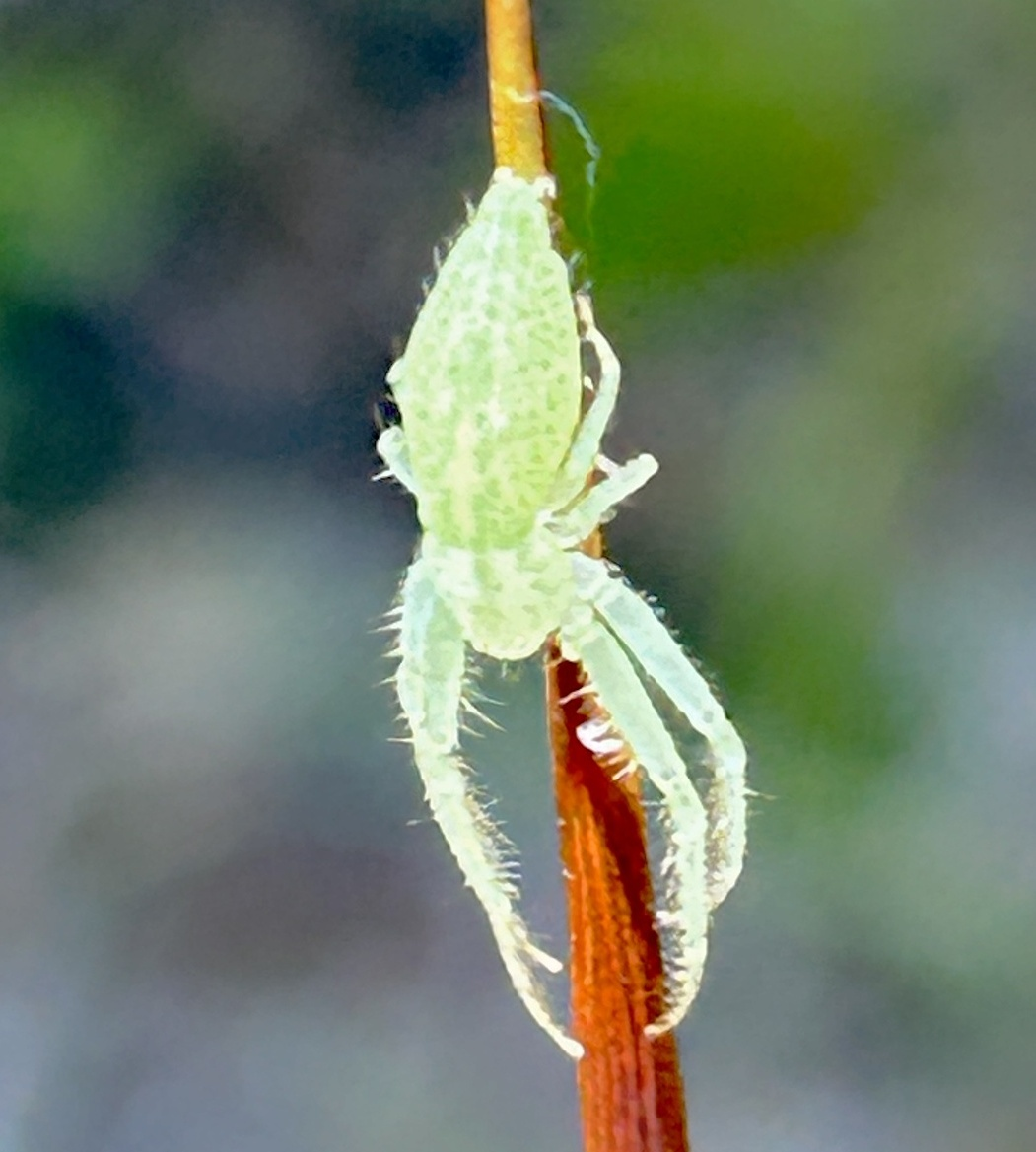
O. leruthi

As of May 2026, this genus includes thirty-one species:

- Oxytate argenteooculata (Simon, 1886) – DR Congo, Tanzania, Zambia, Mozambique, South Africa, Eswatini
- Oxytate attenuata (Thorell, 1895) – Myanmar
- Oxytate bhutanica Ono, 2001 – Bhutan, China
- Oxytate bicornis K. Liu, J. Liu & Xu, 2017 – China
- Oxytate capitulata Tang & Li, 2009 – China
- Oxytate chlorion (Simon, 1906) – India
- Oxytate clavulata Tang, Yin & Peng, 2008 – China
- Oxytate concolor (Caporiacco, 1947) – Ethiopia, South Africa, Lesotho
- Oxytate elongata (Tikader, 1980) – India
- Oxytate forcipata Zhang & Yin, 1998 – China
- Oxytate greenae (Tikader, 1980) – India
- Oxytate guangxiensis He & Hu, 1999 – China
- Oxytate hoshizuna Ono, 1978 – China, Japan
- Oxytate indosinica Caleb, 2026 – India, China
- Oxytate isolata (Hogg, 1914) – Western Australia
- Oxytate jannonei (Caporiacco, 1940) – Ethiopia
- Oxytate kanishkai (Gajbe, 2008) – India
- Oxytate leruthi (Lessert, 1943) – Ivory Coast, Ghana, DR Congo, Malawi, South Africa
- Oxytate lobia Lee, Yoo & Kim, 2021 – Korea
- Oxytate mucunica Liu, 2022 – China
- Oxytate multa Tang & Li, 2010 – China
- Oxytate palmata K. Liu, J. Liu & Xu, 2017 – China
- Oxytate parallela (Simon, 1880) – China, Korea
- Oxytate phaenopomatiformis (Strand, 1907) – Tanzania (Zanzibar)
- Oxytate placentiformis Wang, Chen & Zhang, 2012 – China
- Oxytate ribes (Jézéquel, 1964) – Ivory Coast, South Africa
- Oxytate sangangensis Tang, Bao, Yin & Kim, 1999 – China
- Oxytate striatipes L. Koch, 1878 – Russia (Far East), China, Korea, Taiwan, Japan (type species)
- Oxytate subvirens (Strand, 1907) – India, Sri Lanka
- Oxytate taprobane Benjamin, 2001 – Sri Lanka
- Oxytate virens (Thorell, 1891) – Vietnam, Singapore

== See also ==
- Runcinia, also known as grass crab spiders
