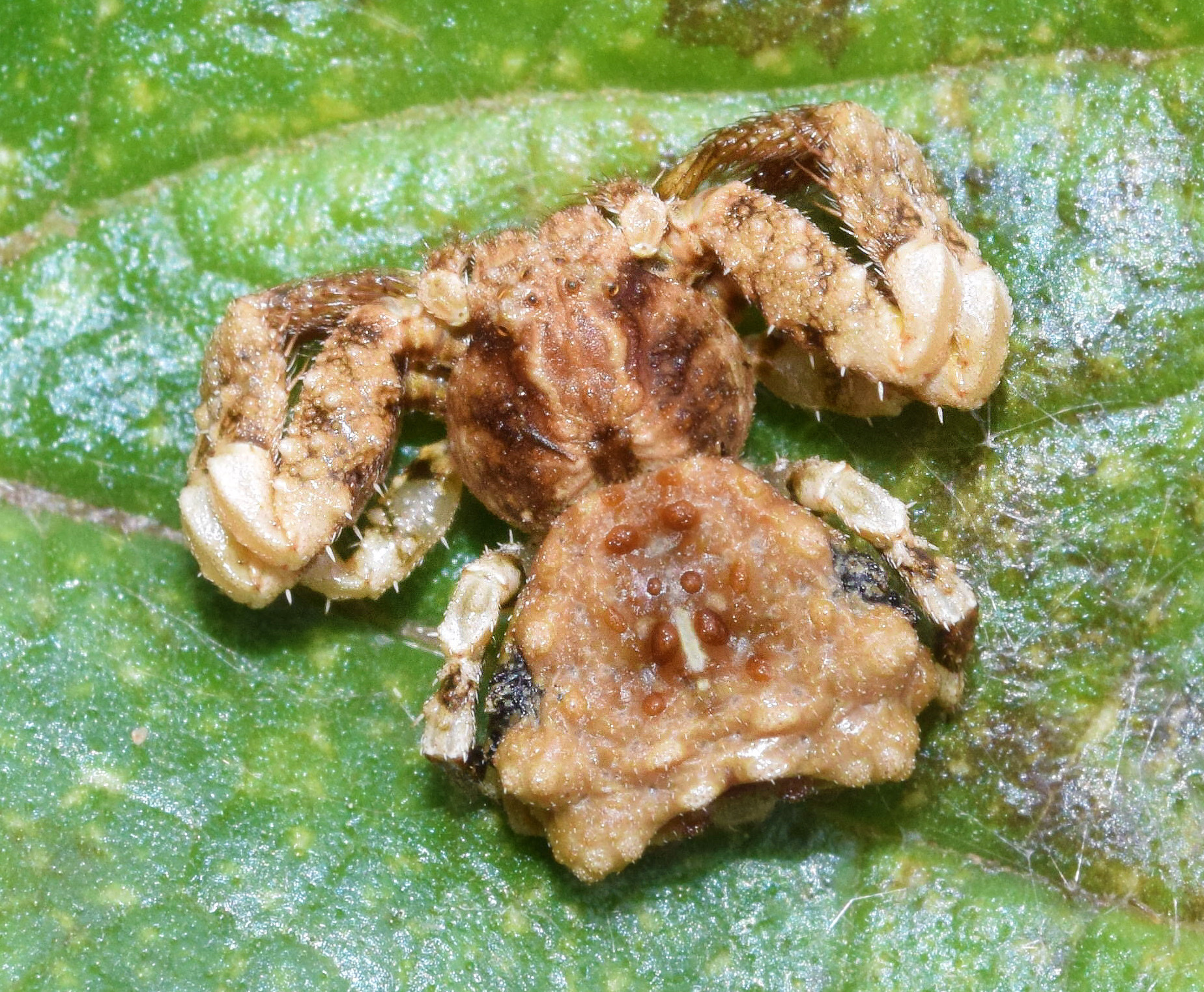

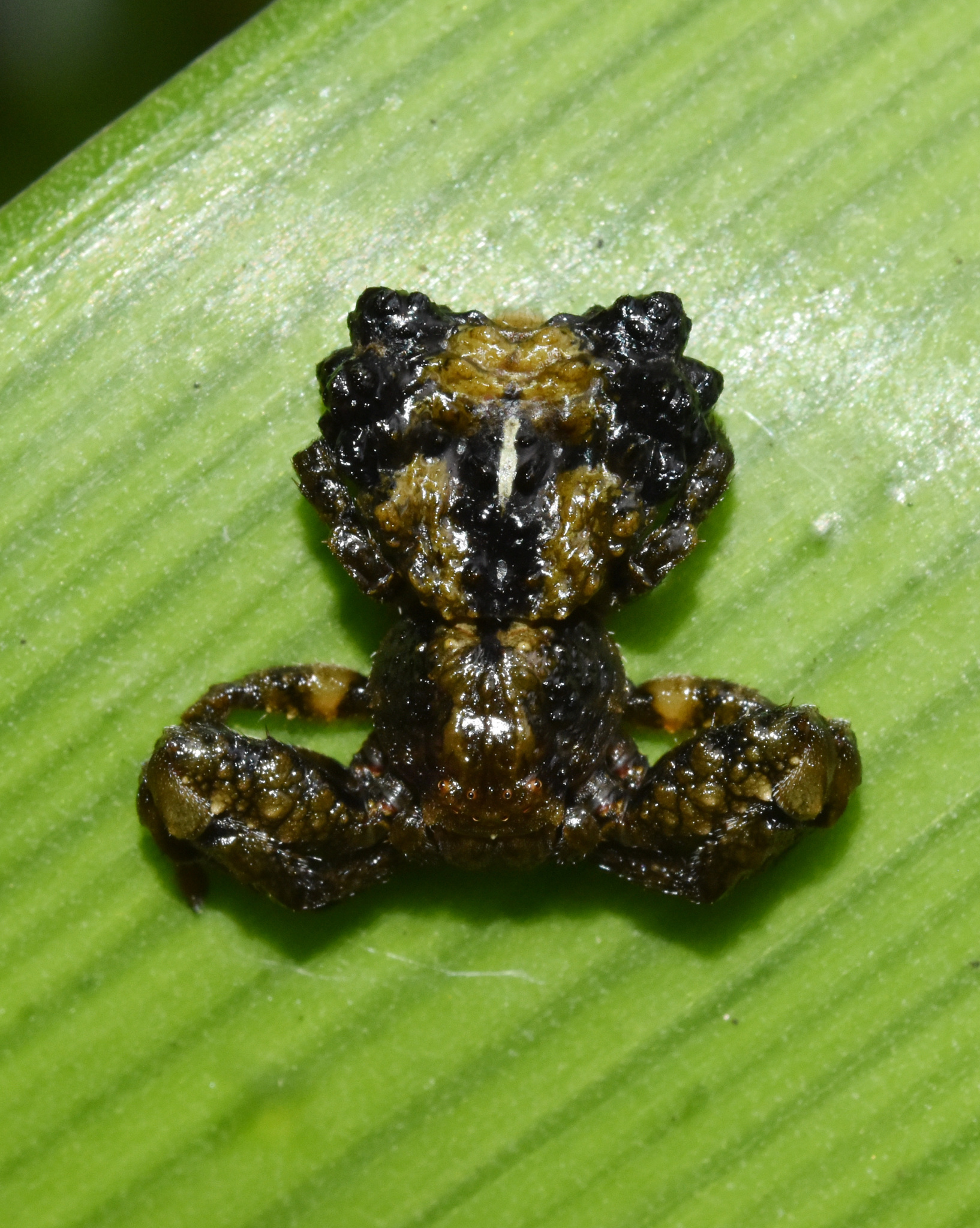

Scientific classification
- Kingdom: Animalia
- Phylum: Arthropoda
- Subphylum: Chelicerata
- Class: Arachnida
- Order: Araneae
- Infraorder: Araneomorphae
- Family: Thomisidae
- Genus: Phrynarachne
- Species: P. rugosa

Binomial name
- Phrynarachne rugosa (Walckenaer, 1805)

Synonyms
- Thomisus rugosus Walckenaer, 1805; Thomisus foka Vinson, 1863; Phrynoides foka Simon, 1864; Phrynoides rugosa Simon, 1864; Phrynarachne foka Thorell, 1875; Phrynarachne vinsoni Mello-Leitão, 1929

= Phrynarachne rugosa =

Bird-Dung Crab Spider

Species of spider

Phrynarachne rugosa is a species of spider in the family Thomisidae. It is found in Africa and nearby islands and is commonly known as bird-dung crab spider.

== Distribution ==
Phrynarachne rugosa is found in Cameroon, Equatorial Guinea, Malawi, Zambia, South Africa, Madagascar, Mauritius, and Réunion.

In South Africa, the species is known from KwaZulu-Natal and the Western Cape. Localities include Richards Bay, Ndumo Game Reserve, De Hoop Nature Reserve, and Knysna Diepwalle Reserve.

== Habitat and ecology ==
Phrynarachne rugosa inhabits the Fynbos, Forest, and Savanna biomes at altitudes ranging from 15 to 47 m.

These spiders are free-living on plants, and are found on the surface of leaves.

== Description ==
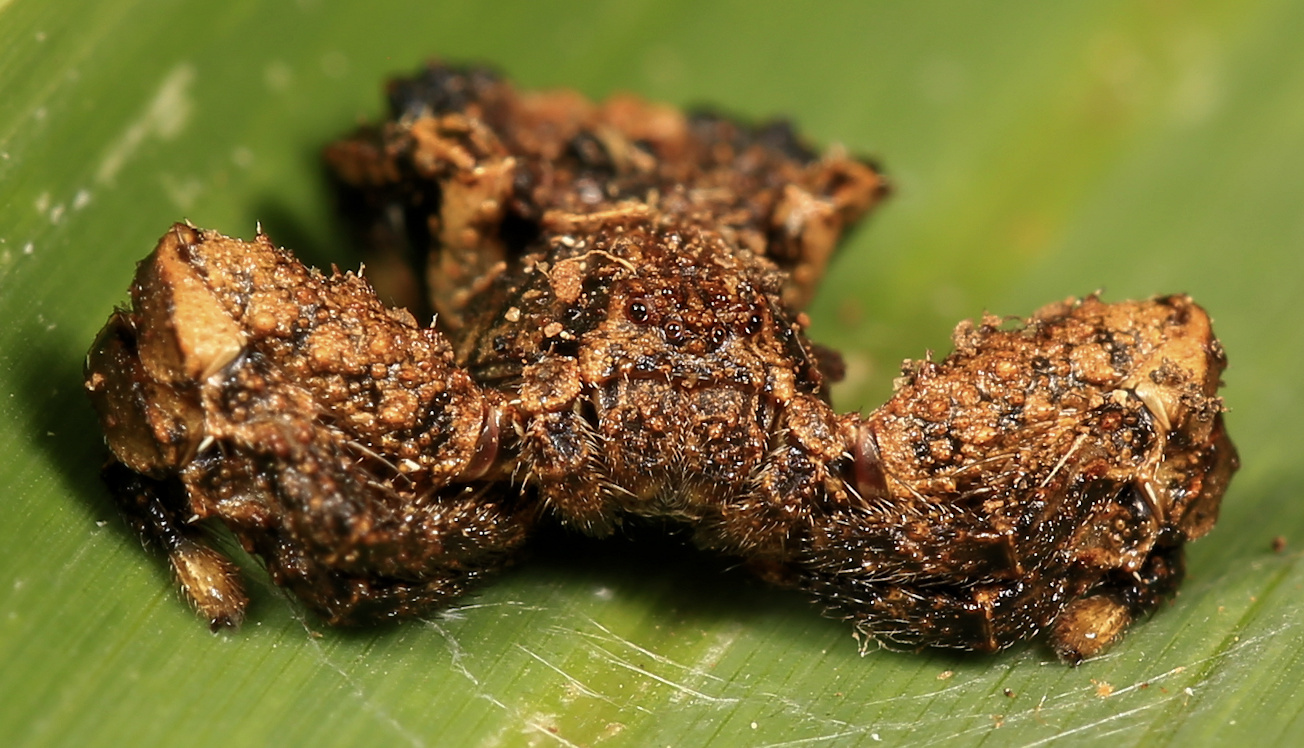

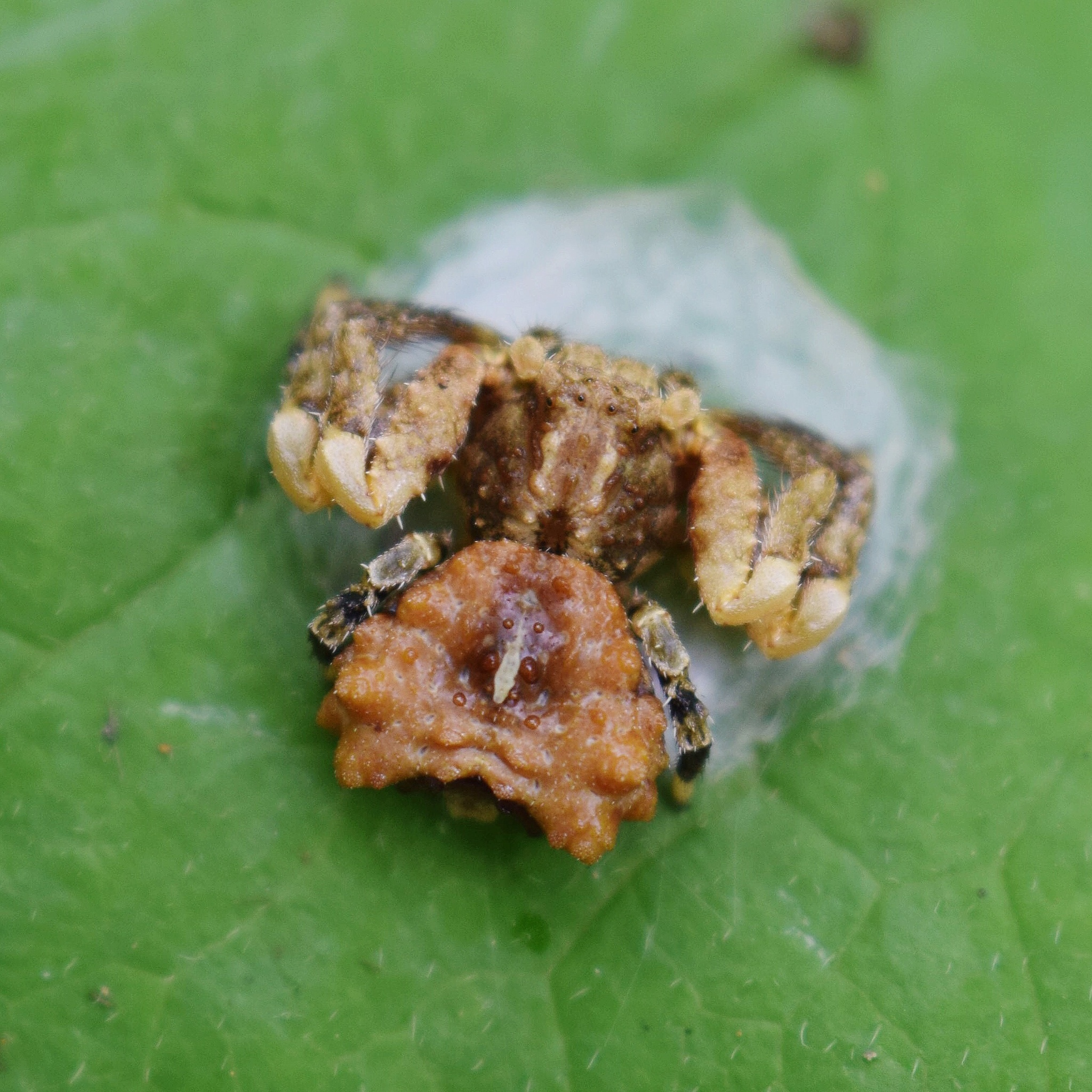

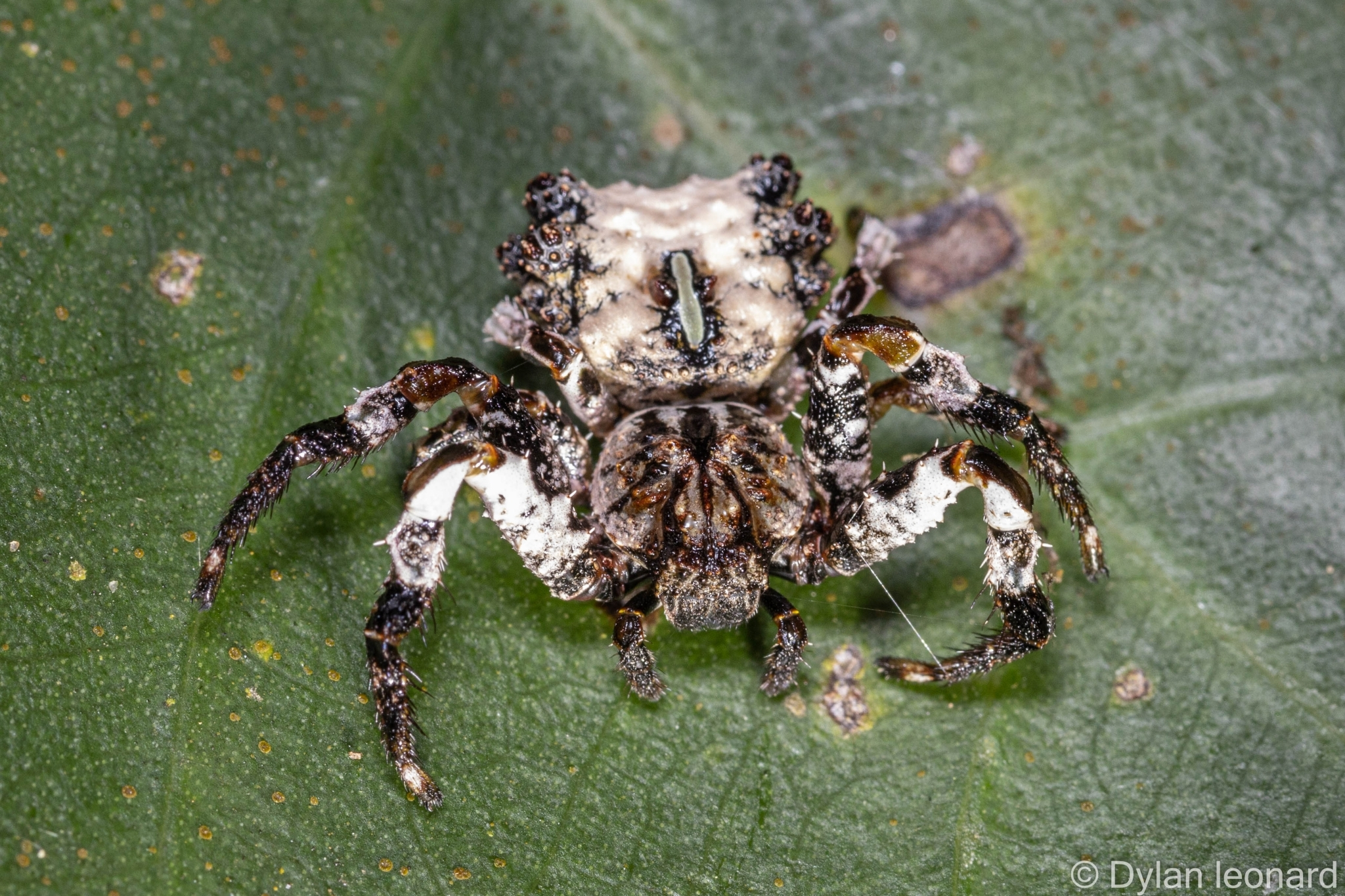

== Conservation ==
Phrynarachne rugosa is listed as Least Concern due to its wide geographical range. The species is recorded in three reserves including Ndumo Game Reserve, De Hoop Nature Reserve, and Knysna and Diepwalle Forest Reserves.

== Taxonomy ==
The species was originally described in 1804 as Thomisus rugosus from Réunion. Both sexes are known.
