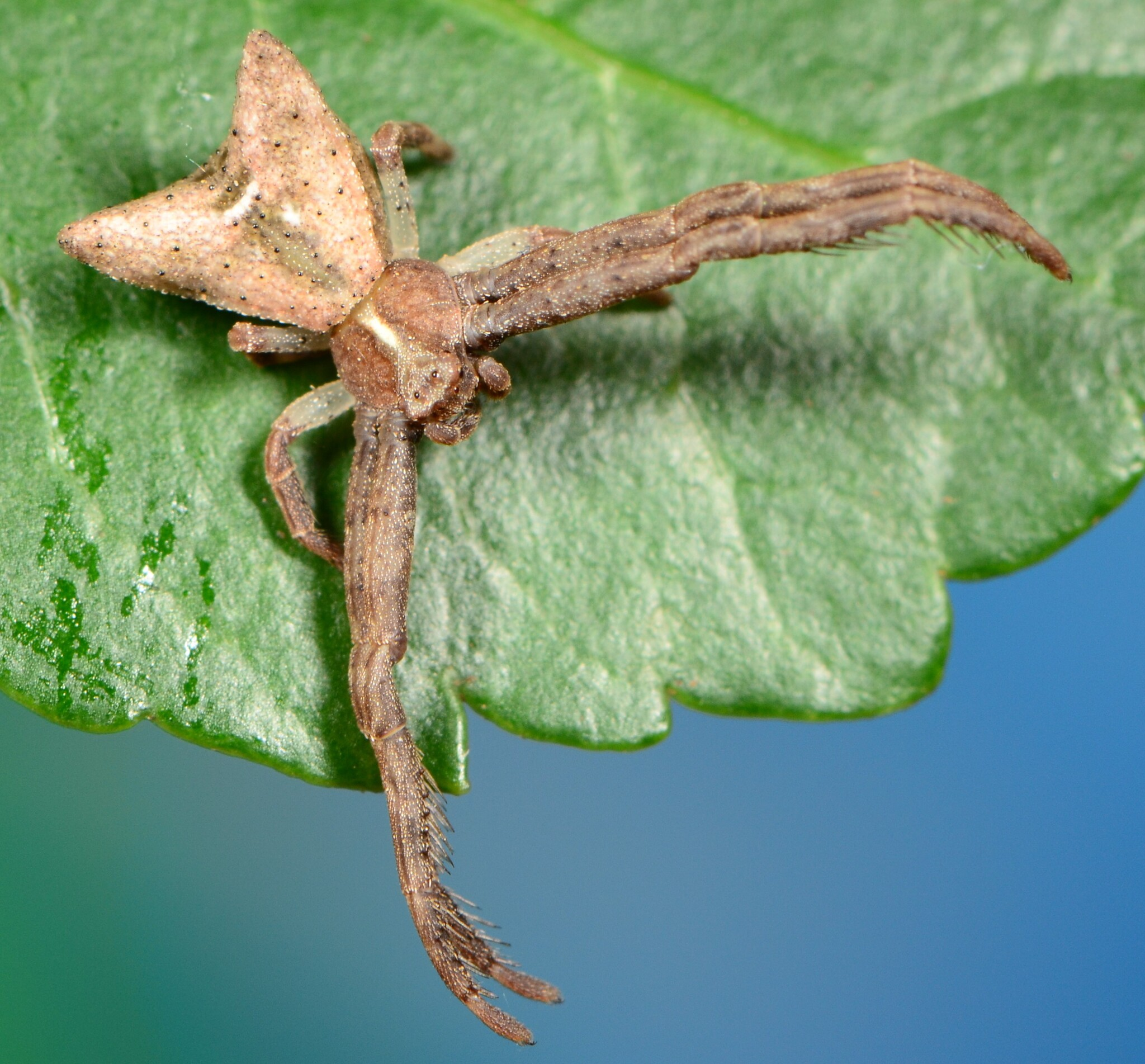
- female
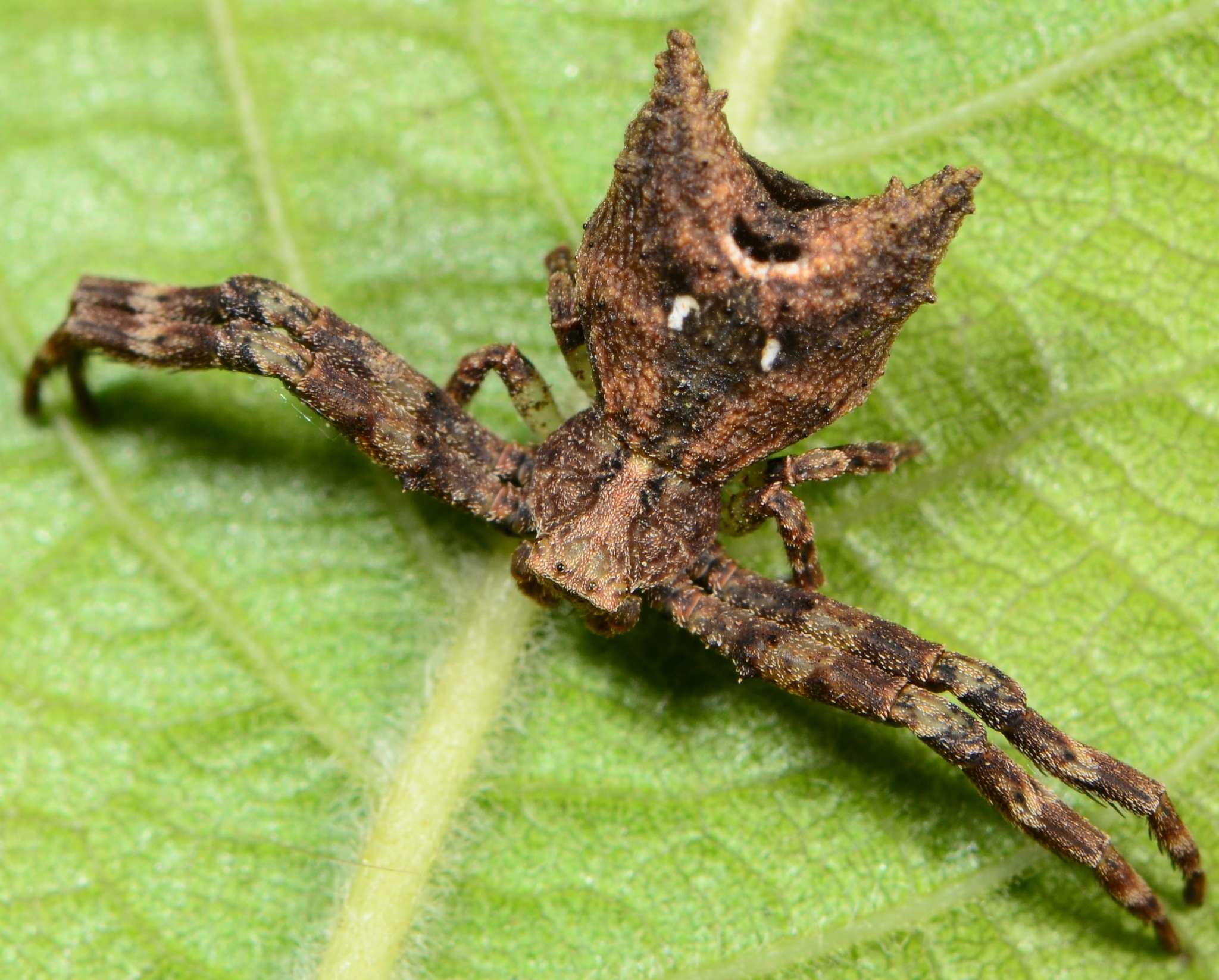
- male

Scientific classification
- Kingdom: Animalia
- Phylum: Arthropoda
- Subphylum: Chelicerata
- Class: Arachnida
- Order: Araneae
- Infraorder: Araneomorphae
- Family: Thomisidae
- Genus: Phrynarachne
- Species: P. melloleitaoi

Binomial name
- Phrynarachne melloleitaoi Lessert, 1933

= Phrynarachne melloleitaoi =

Species of spider

Phrynarachne melloleitaoi is a southern African species of spider in the family Thomisidae.

== Distribution ==
Phrynarachne melloleitaoi is found in Angola, Lesotho, and South Africa.

In South Africa, the species is recorded from the Eastern Cape, KwaZulu-Natal, Mpumalanga, Northern Cape, and Western Cape. Notable locations include Coffee Bay, Cwebe Nature Reserve, Hogsback, Addo Elephant National Park, Loteni Nature Reserve, Vernon Crookes Nature Reserve, De Hoop Nature Reserve, Cape Town, and Robben Island.

== Habitat and ecology ==
Phrynarachne melloleitaoi inhabits the Fynbos, Forest, Grassland, Savanna, and Thicket biomes at altitudes ranging from 6 to 2066 m.

These spiders are free-living on plants, and have been sampled from citrus orchards.

== Description ==
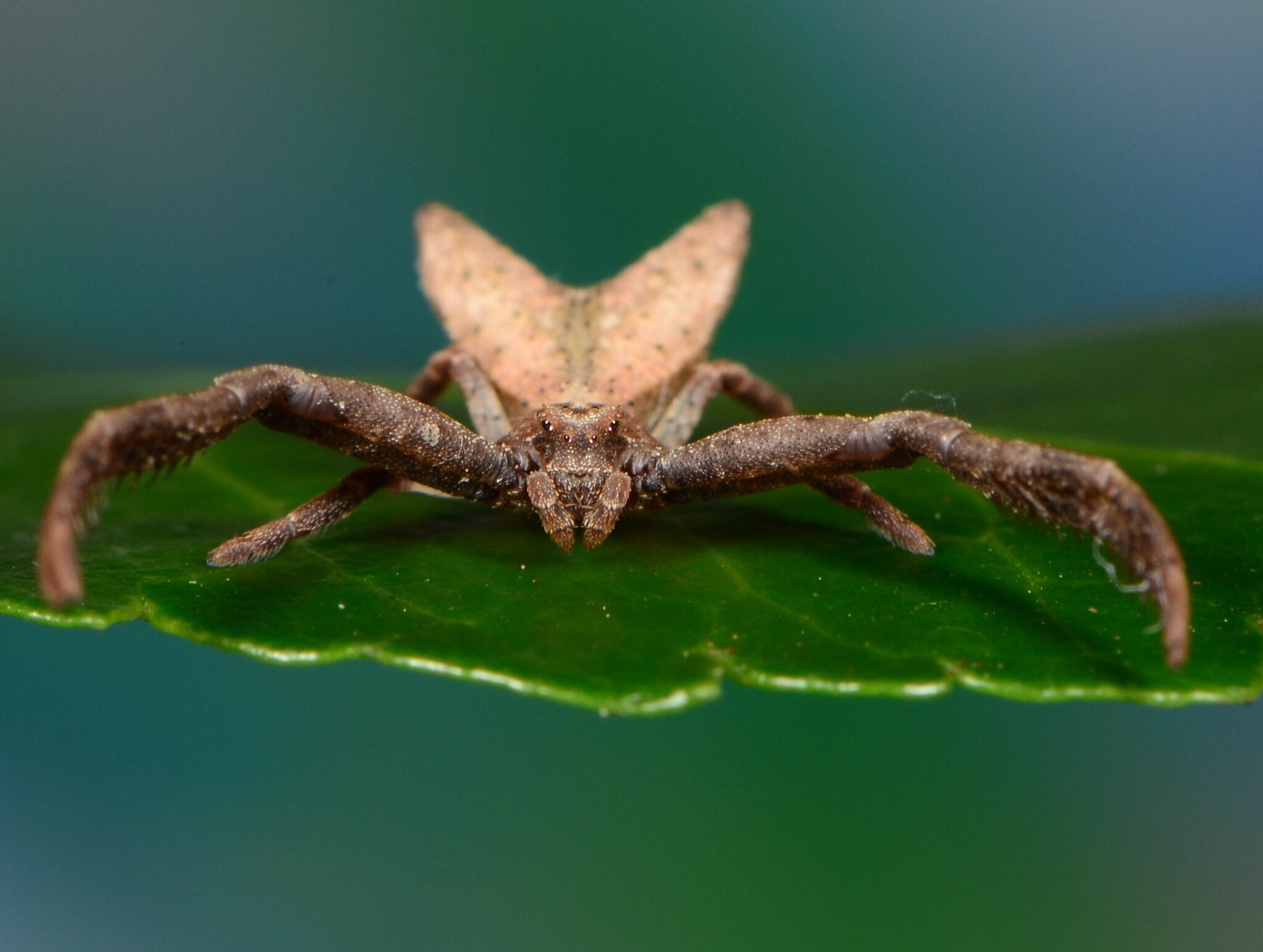
female

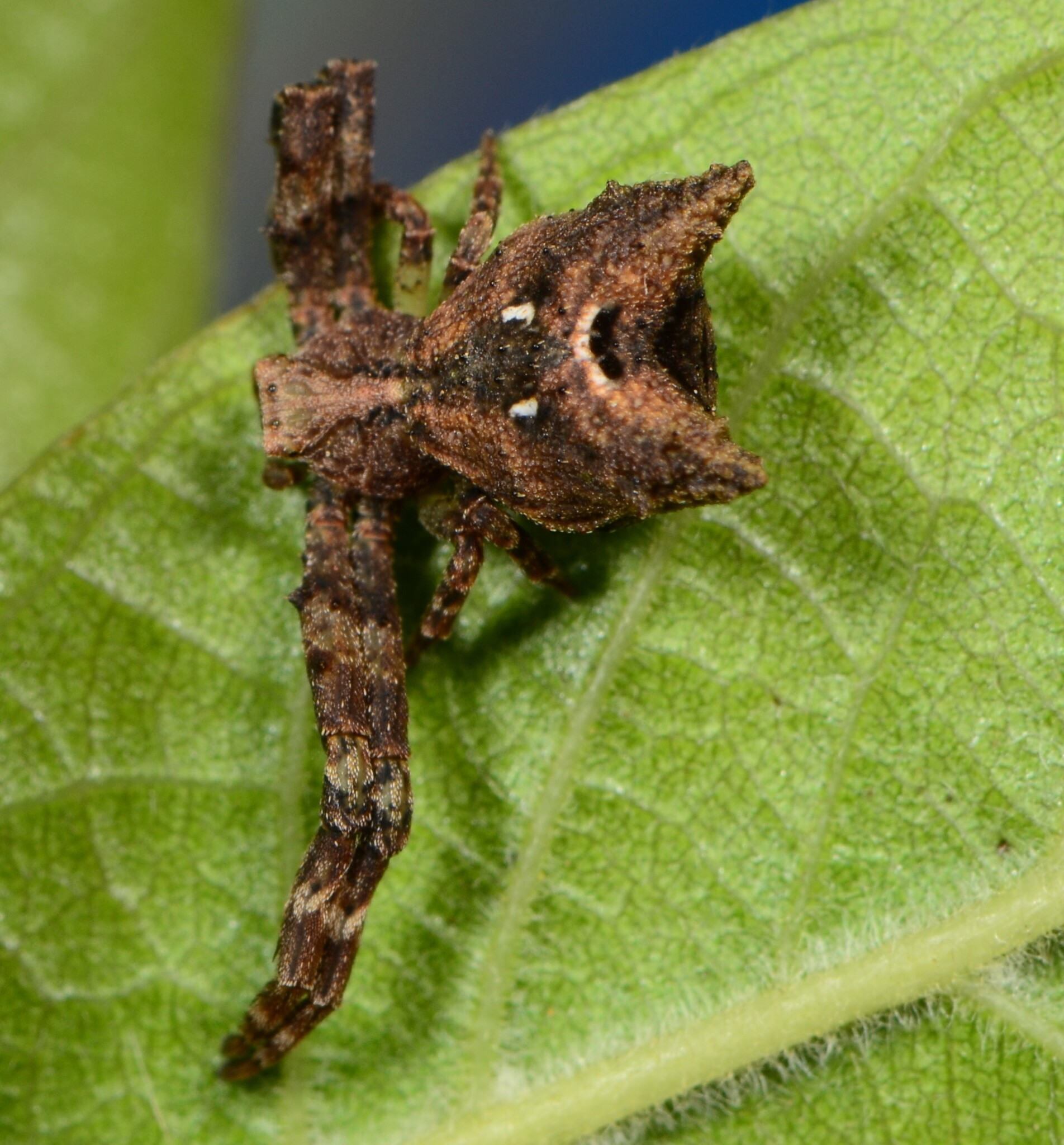
male

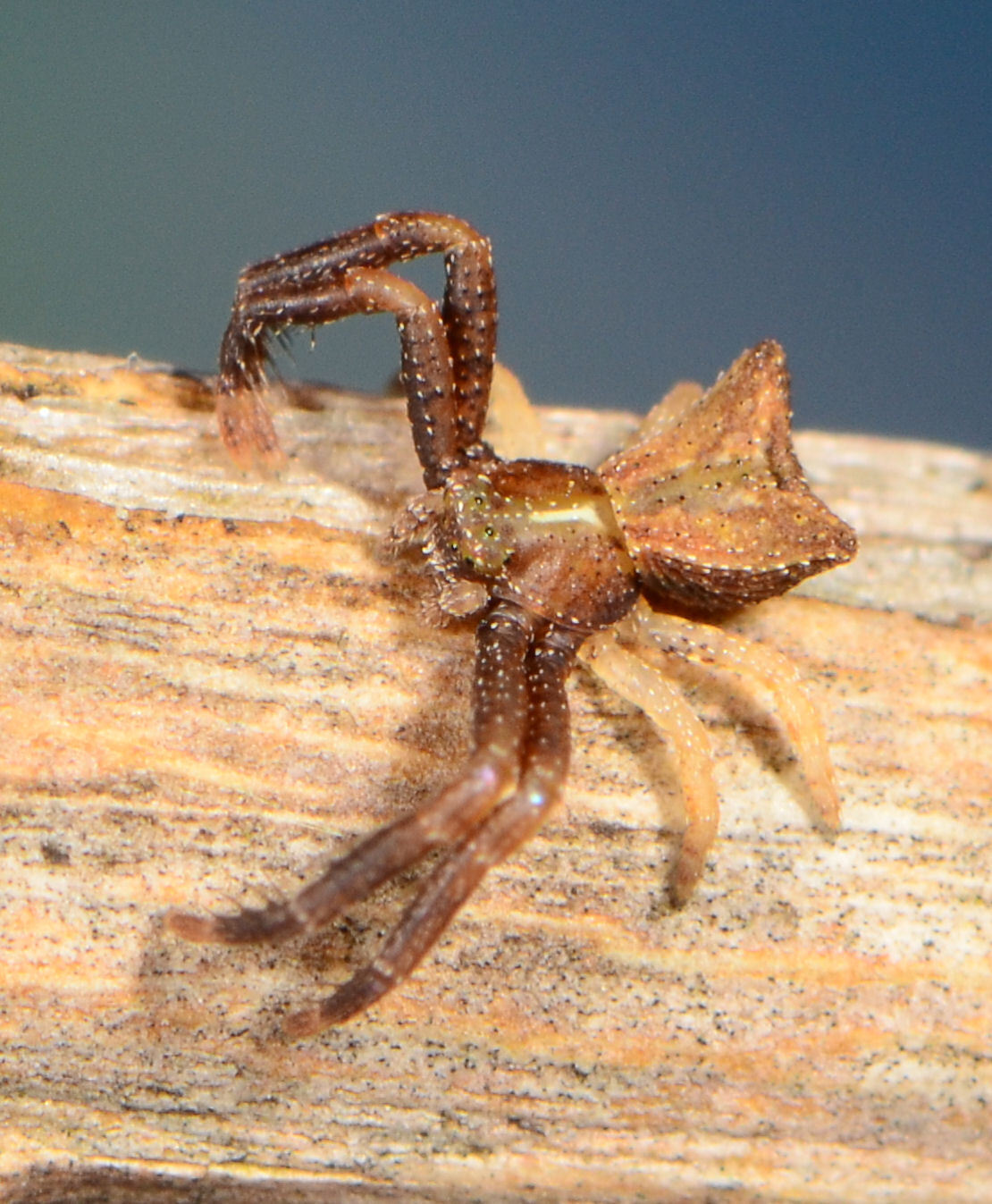
juvenile male

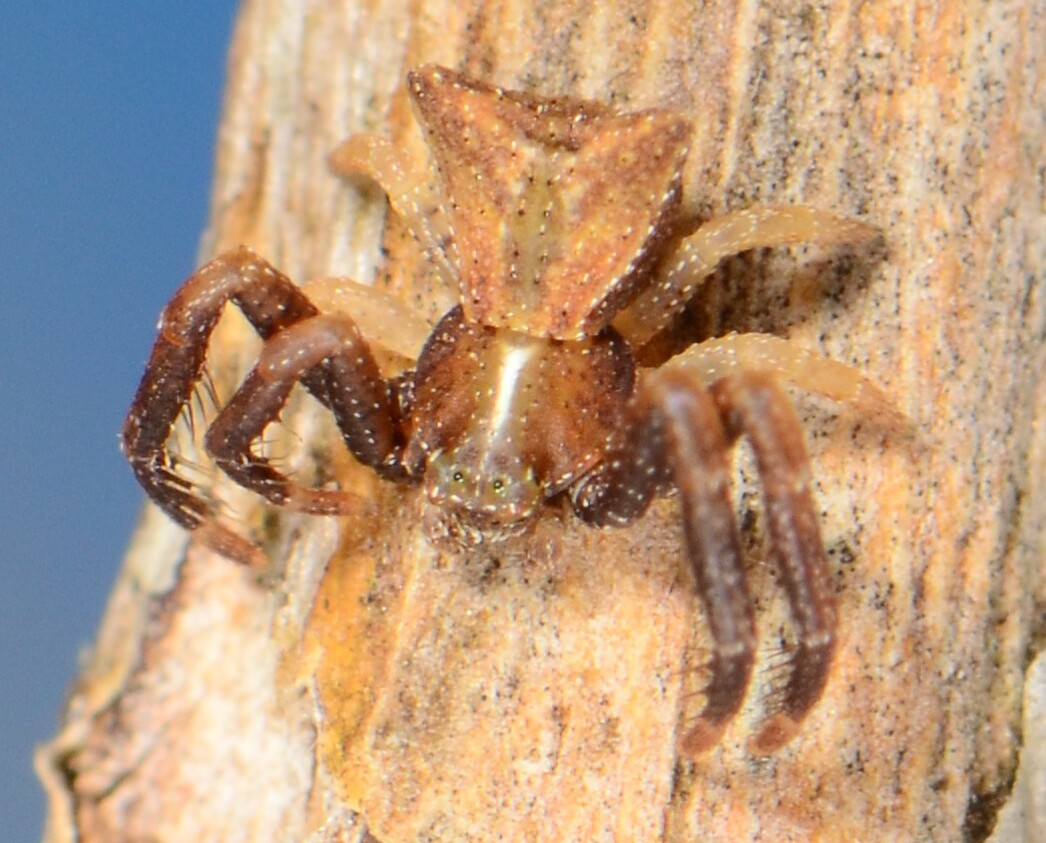
juvenile male

== Conservation ==
Phrynarachne melloleitaoi is listed as Least Concern by the South African National Biodiversity Institute due to its wide geographical range. It is protected in reserves including Addo Elephant National Park, Cwebe Nature Reserve, Loteni Nature Reserve, Vernon Crookes Nature Reserve, and De Hoop Nature Reserve.

== Etymology ==
Phrynarachne melloleitaoi is named after Brazilian zoologist Cândido Firmino de Mello-Leitão (1886-1948), who is considered the founder of arachnology in South America.

== Taxonomy ==
The species was originally described by Lessert in 1933 from Angola. Both sexes are known.
