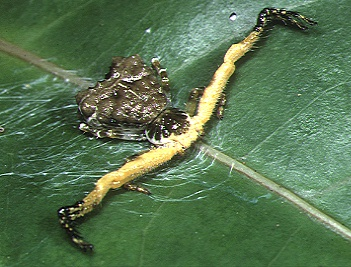
- Female

Scientific classification
- Domain: Eukaryota
- Kingdom: Animalia
- Phylum: Arthropoda
- Subphylum: Chelicerata
- Class: Arachnida
- Order: Araneae
- Infraorder: Araneomorphae
- Family: Thomisidae
- Genus: Phrynarachne
- Species: P. ceylonica

Binomial name
- Phrynarachne ceylonica (O. Pickard-Cambridge, 1884)

Synonyms
- Ornithoscatoides ceylonica O. Pickard-Cambridge, 1884

= Phrynarachne ceylonica =

Bird dung spider

Species of spider

Phrynarachne ceylonica, the bird dung spider, is a species of spiders of the family Thomisidae. It is found in China, Japan, Sri Lanka, Taiwan, and India. The species is known to discharge a foul smell which help it attract prey and deter predators. It both smells like and resembles bird feces, hence the name 'bird dung spider'. The bird dung spider resembles bird feces only when it curls up in response to a predatory threat. It is characteristically known for its dual-purposed ability to mimic the smell and appearance of bird feces to both lure prey and protect against predators. This species of crab spider has a flat, black-brown abdomen with bright yellow legs. The width of the female abdomen is approximately 9.3 mm and the length of the body is approximately 14.5 mm.

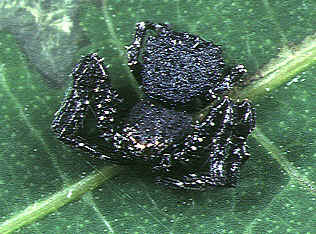
Male

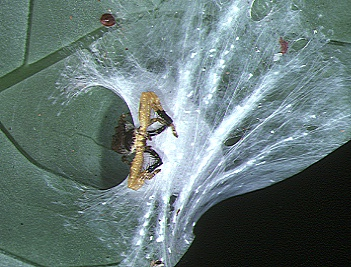
Female with eggsac
