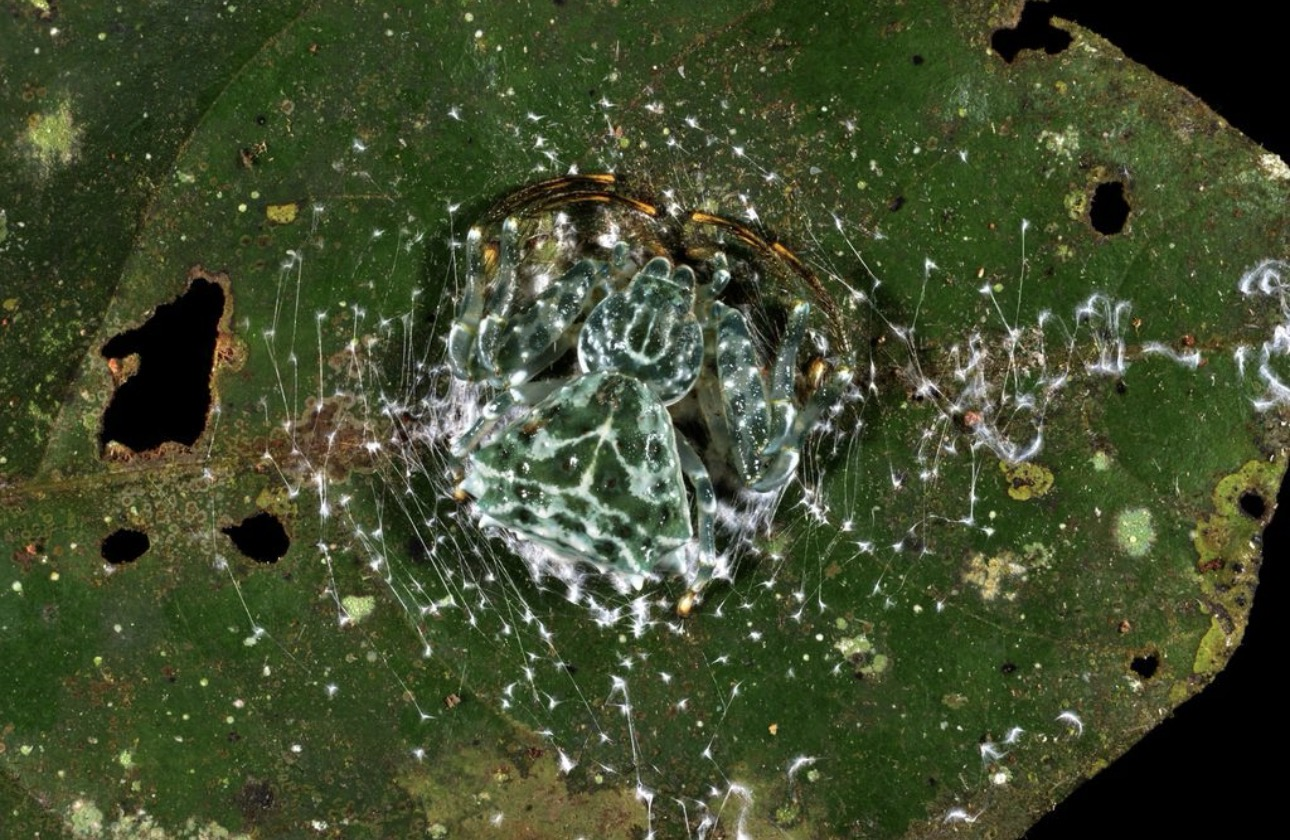
- Phrynarachne dreepy in Myanmar

Scientific classification
- Kingdom: Animalia
- Phylum: Arthropoda
- Subphylum: Chelicerata
- Class: Arachnida
- Order: Araneae
- Infraorder: Araneomorphae
- Family: Thomisidae
- Genus: Phrynarachne
- Species: P. dreepy

Binomial name
- Phrynarachne dreepy Lin & Li, 2022

= Phrynarachne dreepy =

Species of spider

Phrynarachne dreepy is a species of crab spider described in 2022. It is found in Southeast Asia and Papua.

== Etymology ==
The specific epithet "dreepy" refers to the Pokémon character Dreepy, from the video games Pokémon Sword and Shield, due to the resemblance of the spider's triangular abdomen to the character's head.

== Taxonomy ==
The species was described by Yejie Lin and Shuqiang Li in 2022, based on specimens collected from Xishuangbanna, Yunnan, China.

Within the genus Phrynarachne, P. dreepy is considered similar to P. brevis but can be distinguished by morphological characteristics of the male pedipalp (e.g., a long ventral tibial apophysis and a spiraled, thin embolus) and the female epigyne (with a straight anterior edge and a slightly recurved posterior edge of the median plate).

== Description ==
The male holotype has a total body length of 2.26 mm. The carapace is yellow-brown with white tubercles. The abdomen is dark brown, with approximately 18 tubercles on each side, each bearing a clavate seta. The legs are yellow-brown, with spines on the first two pairs of legs.

The female is significantly larger, with a total length of 8.45 mm. The carapace is pale yellow, and the abdomen is pale green when alive, adorned with 13 triangular tubercles on each side. The epigyne has sclerotized margins and a nearly rectangular median plate.

== Distribution and habitat ==
This species is found in western India, Myanmar, Thailand, Laos, Vietnam, China (Hainan, Yunnan, Guangxi and Guangdong), Malaysia, Brunei, Indonesia and Papua New Guinea.
