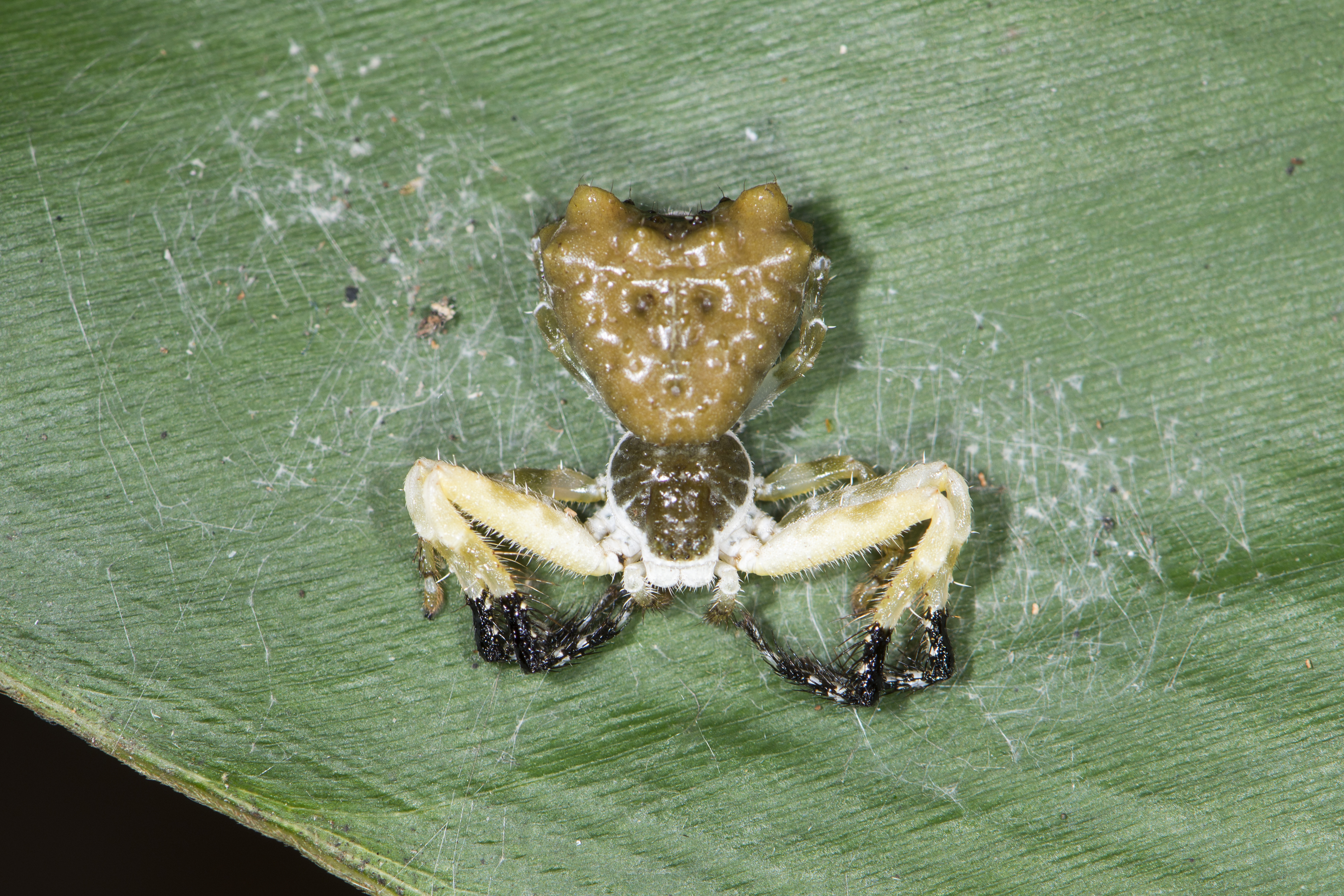
- P. ceylonica

Scientific classification
- Kingdom: Animalia
- Phylum: Arthropoda
- Subphylum: Chelicerata
- Class: Arachnida
- Order: Araneae
- Infraorder: Araneomorphae
- Family: Thomisidae
- Genus: Phrynarachne; Thorell, 1869

= Phrynarachne =

Genus of spiders

Phrynarachne is a genus of crab spiders first described by Tamerlan Thorell in 1869.

== Distribution ==
Spiders in this genus are found in Asia and Africa.

== Description ==
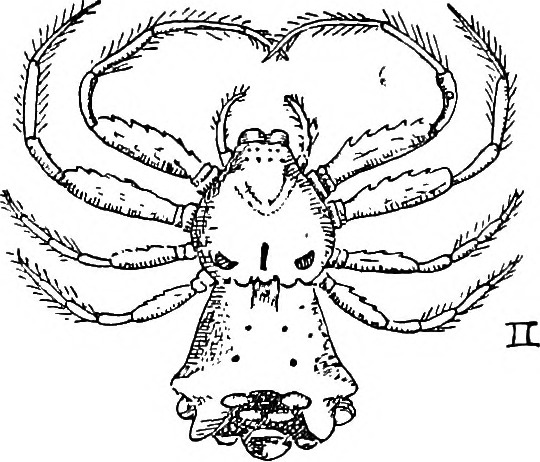
P. decipiens

The genus Phrynarachne exhibits colour variation from dull brownish red to greyish white.

The carapace is as long as wide or longer with a broad and obtusely truncated clypeus in some species such as P. rugosa. The integument is hard, unequal, grooved and bearing distinct tubercles.

The eye region is narrower anteriorly with two equally recurved eye rows, the anterior row narrower than the posterior row. The posterior eyes are equidistant from each other with median eyes half the size of the lateral eyes. The median ocular quadrangle is as long as wide or slightly longer, slightly narrower anteriorly, with lateral eyes raised on common elevations.

The abdomen shape is variable with hard, unequal, grooved integument bearing distinct tubercles in P. rugosa, or with distinct extensions in P. melloleitaoi.

Legs are thick and robust, angular and grooved, with legs I and II stronger than the rest. The tibiae and metatarsi of legs I and II are almost the same length, flattened on the underside and armed with numerous robust, fairly short rows of spines. The tarsi have irregular and recumbent hairs with tarsal claws sometimes robust, curved with 6 to 10 teeth.

Males are smaller than females with anterior legs more slender and armed with fine, very long spines. The palp has two small tibial apophyses.

== Life style ==
These spiders live on the surface of leaves on a disc of white silk with a striking resemblance to bird excrement.

== Species ==
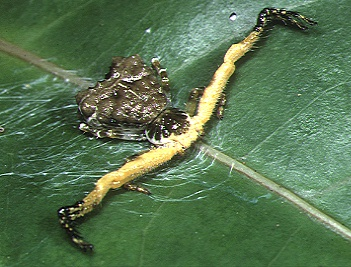
female P. ceylonica

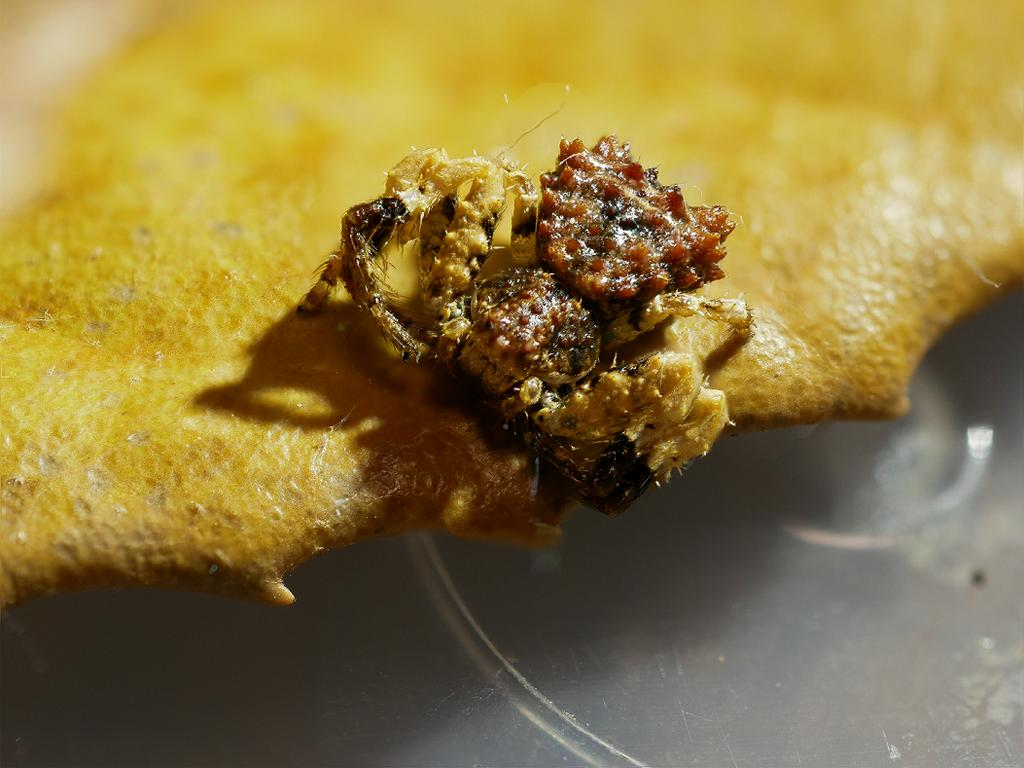
P. katoi

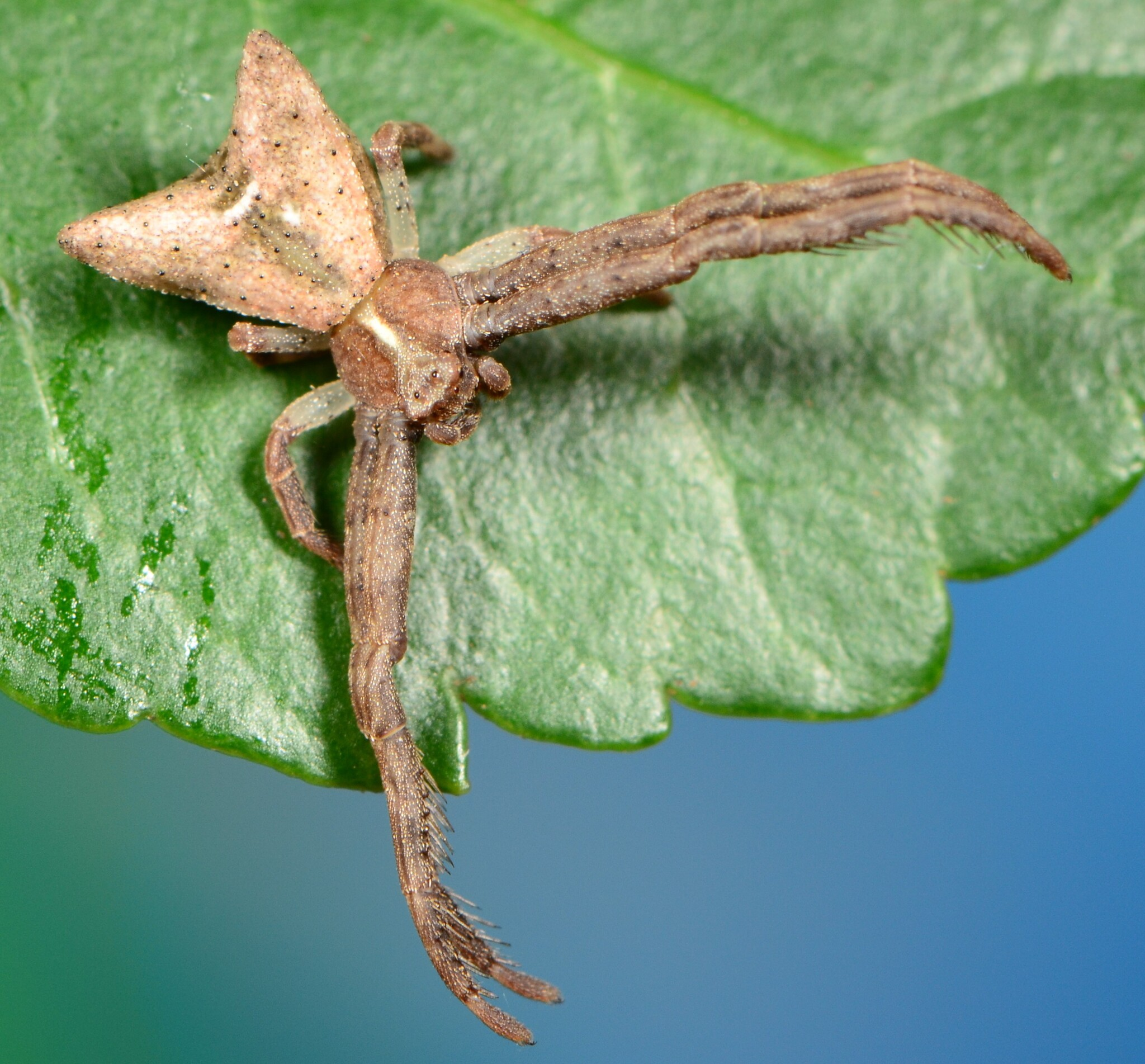
female P. melloleitaoi

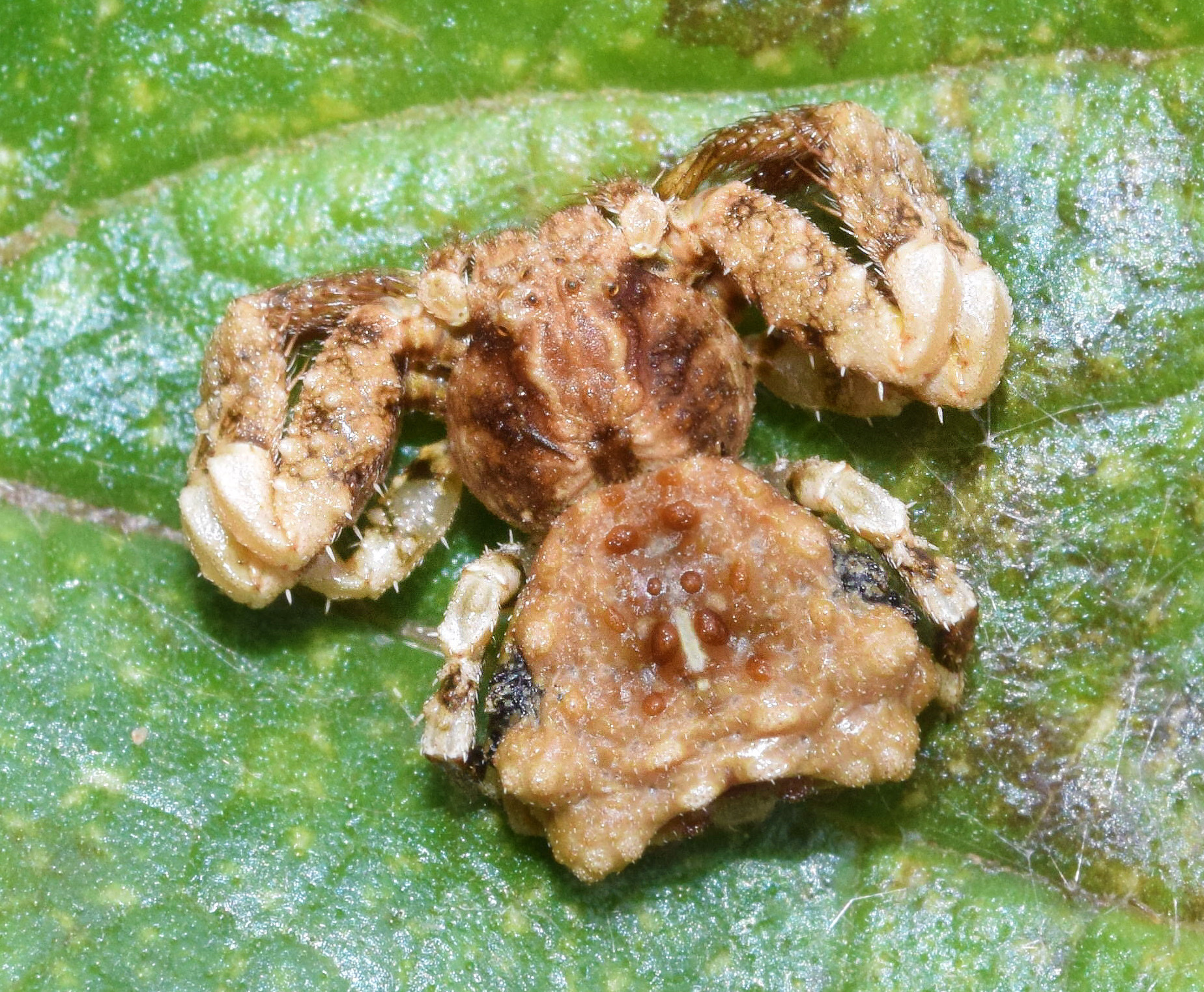
P. rugosa

As of October 2025, this genus includes 34 species and one subspecies:

- Phrynarachne aspera Thorell, 1895 – Myanmar
- Phrynarachne bimaculata Thorell, 1895 – Myanmar
- Phrynarachne brevis Tang & Li, 2010 – China
- Phrynarachne ceylonica (O. Pickard-Cambridge, 1884) – India, Sri Lanka to China, Taiwan, Japan
- Phrynarachne cheesmanae (Berland, 1938) – Vanuatu
- Phrynarachne clavigera Simon, 1903 – Madagascar
- Phrynarachne coerulescens (Doleschall, 1859) – Indonesia (Java)
- Phrynarachne cucullata Simon, 1886 – Cambodia, Vietnam, Moluccas
- Phrynarachne decipiens (Forbes, 1884) – India, Malaysia, Indonesia (Java, Sumatra)
- Phrynarachne dissimilis (Doleschall, 1859) – Indonesia (Java)
- Phrynarachne dreepy Lin & Li, 2022 – Southeast Asia and Papua
- Phrynarachne fatalis O. Pickard-Cambridge, 1899 – Sri Lanka
- Phrynarachne gracilipes Pavesi, 1895 – Ethiopia
- Phrynarachne huangshanensis Li, Chen & Song, 1985 – China
- Phrynarachne jobiensis (Thorell, 1877) – New Guinea
- Phrynarachne kannegieteri van Hasselt, 1893 – Indonesia (Sumatra)
- Phrynarachne katoi Chikuni, 1955 – China, Korea, Japan
- Phrynarachne lancea Tang & Li, 2010 – China
- Phrynarachne mammillata Song, 1990 – China
- Phrynarachne marmorata Pocock, 1900 – Equatorial Guinea
- Phrynarachne melloleitaoi Lessert, 1933 – Angola, South Africa, Lesotho
- Phrynarachne olivacea Jézéquel, 1964 – Ivory Coast
- Phrynarachne papulata Thorell, 1891 – Indonesia (Sumatra)
- Phrynarachne peeliana (Stoliczka, 1869) – India
- Phrynarachne pusiola Simon, 1903 – Madagascar
- Phrynarachne rothschildi Pocock, 1903 – Sri Lanka
- Phrynarachne rubroperlata Simon, 1907 – West Africa
- Phrynarachne rugosa (Walckenaer, 1805) – West Africa, Cameroon, Equatorial Guinea, Zambia, Malawi, South Africa, Madagascar, Réunion, Mauritius (type species)
  - P. r. spongicolorata Millot, 1942 – Guinea
- Phrynarachne tuberculata Rainbow, 1899 – New Guinea
- Phrynarachne tuberosa (Blackwall, 1864) – India
- Phrynarachne tuberosula (Karsch, 1880) – West Africa
- Phrynarachne xuxiake Lin & Li, 2022 – China
- Phrynarachne yunhui Lin & Li, 2022 – China (Hainan)
- Phrynarachne zhengzhongi Lin & Li, 2022 – China
