= Phrynarachne rothschildi =

Scientific classification
- Kingdom: Animalia
- Phylum: Arthropoda
- Subphylum: Chelicerata
- Class: Arachnida
- Order: Araneae
- Infraorder: Araneomorphae
- Family: Thomisidae
- Genus: Phrynarachne
- Species: P. rothschildi

Binomial name
- Phrynarachne rothschildi Pocock & Rothschild, 1903

Species of spider

Phrynarachne rothschildi is a species of spiders of the family Thomisidae. It is endemic to Sri Lanka.
