= Phrynarachne fatalis =

Scientific classification
- Kingdom: Animalia
- Phylum: Arthropoda
- Subphylum: Chelicerata
- Class: Arachnida
- Order: Araneae
- Infraorder: Araneomorphae
- Family: Thomisidae
- Genus: Phrynarachne
- Species: P. fatalis

Binomial name
- Phrynarachne fatalis O. Pickard-Cambridge, 1899

Species of spider

Phrynarachne fatalis is a species of spider of the family Thomisidae. It is endemic to Sri Lanka.
