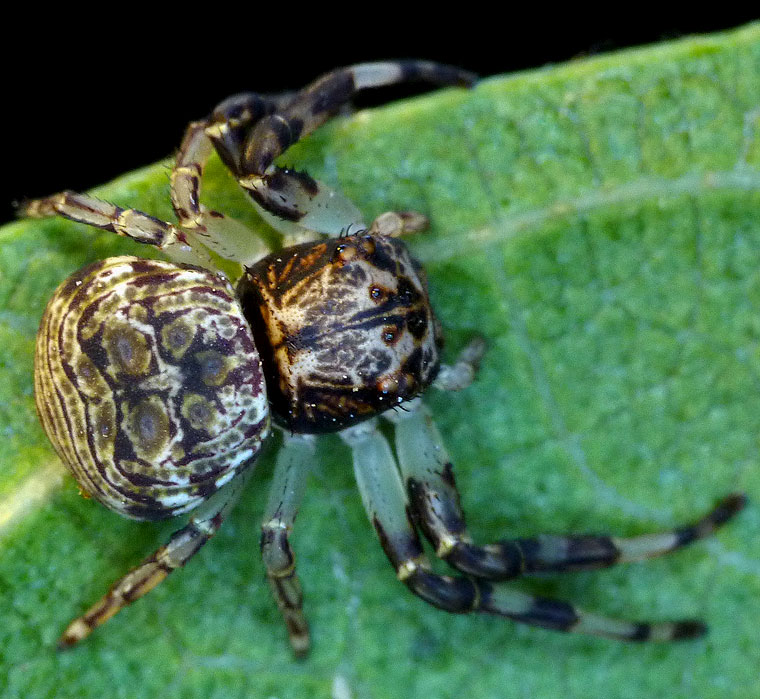
- C. saucia

Scientific classification
- Kingdom: Animalia
- Phylum: Arthropoda
- Subphylum: Chelicerata
- Class: Arachnida
- Order: Araneae
- Infraorder: Araneomorphae
- Family: Thomisidae
- Genus: Cymbacha; L. Koch, 1874

Type species
- C. festiva L. Koch, 1874

Species
- 8, see text

= Cymbacha =

Genus of spiders

Cymbacha is a genus of crab spiders that was first described by Ludwig Carl Christian Koch in 1874.

== Species ==
As of July 2020 it contains eight species, endemic to Papua New Guinea, Australia, and Sri Lanka:

- Cymbacha cerea L. Koch, 1876 – Australia (Queensland)
- Cymbacha festiva L. Koch, 1874 (type) – Australia (Queensland, New South Wales)
- Cymbacha ocellata L. Koch, 1874 – Australia (Queensland)
- Cymbacha saucia L. Koch, 1874 – New Guinea, Australia (Queensland)
- Cymbacha setosa L. Koch, 1874 – Australia (Queensland)
- Cymbacha similis L. Koch, 1876 – Australia (New South Wales, Tasmania)
- Cymbacha simplex Simon, 1895 – Sri Lanka
- Cymbacha striatipes L. Koch, 1876 – Australia (Queensland)

== See also ==
- List of Thomisidae species
