= Cymbacha simplex =

Scientific classification
- Kingdom: Animalia
- Phylum: Arthropoda
- Subphylum: Chelicerata
- Class: Arachnida
- Order: Araneae
- Infraorder: Araneomorphae
- Family: Thomisidae
- Genus: Cymbacha
- Species: C. simplex

Binomial name
- Cymbacha simplex Simon, 1895

Species of spider

Cymbacha simplex is a species of spiders of the genus Cymbacha. It is endemic to Sri Lanka.

== See also ==
- List of Thomisidae species
