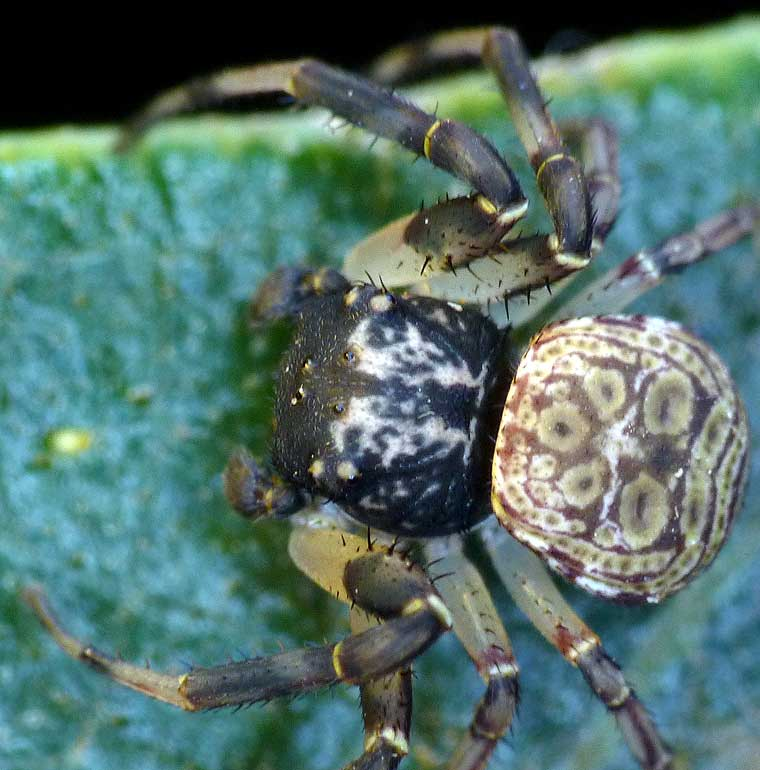

Scientific classification
- Kingdom: Animalia
- Phylum: Arthropoda
- Subphylum: Chelicerata
- Class: Arachnida
- Order: Araneae
- Infraorder: Araneomorphae
- Family: Thomisidae
- Genus: Cymbacha
- Species: C. saucia

Binomial name
- Cymbacha saucia L.Koch, 1874

= Cymbacha saucia =

Black crab spider

Species of spider

Cymbacha saucia is a crab spider found in Australia. The body length of the female is up to 7 mm, the male 4 mm. A cryptic small species, the colour is usually brown, grey and black. Often found in a folded leaf, used as a retreat.

== See also ==
- List of Thomisidae species
