= Cymbacha festiva =

Scientific classification
- Kingdom: Animalia
- Phylum: Arthropoda
- Subphylum: Chelicerata
- Class: Arachnida
- Order: Araneae
- Infraorder: Araneomorphae
- Family: Thomisidae
- Genus: Cymbacha
- Species: C. festiva

Binomial name
- Cymbacha festiva L. Koch, 1874

Species of spider

Cymbacha festiva is a species of spiders in the family Thomisidae. It is endemic to Australia where it is found in Queensland and New South Wales.
