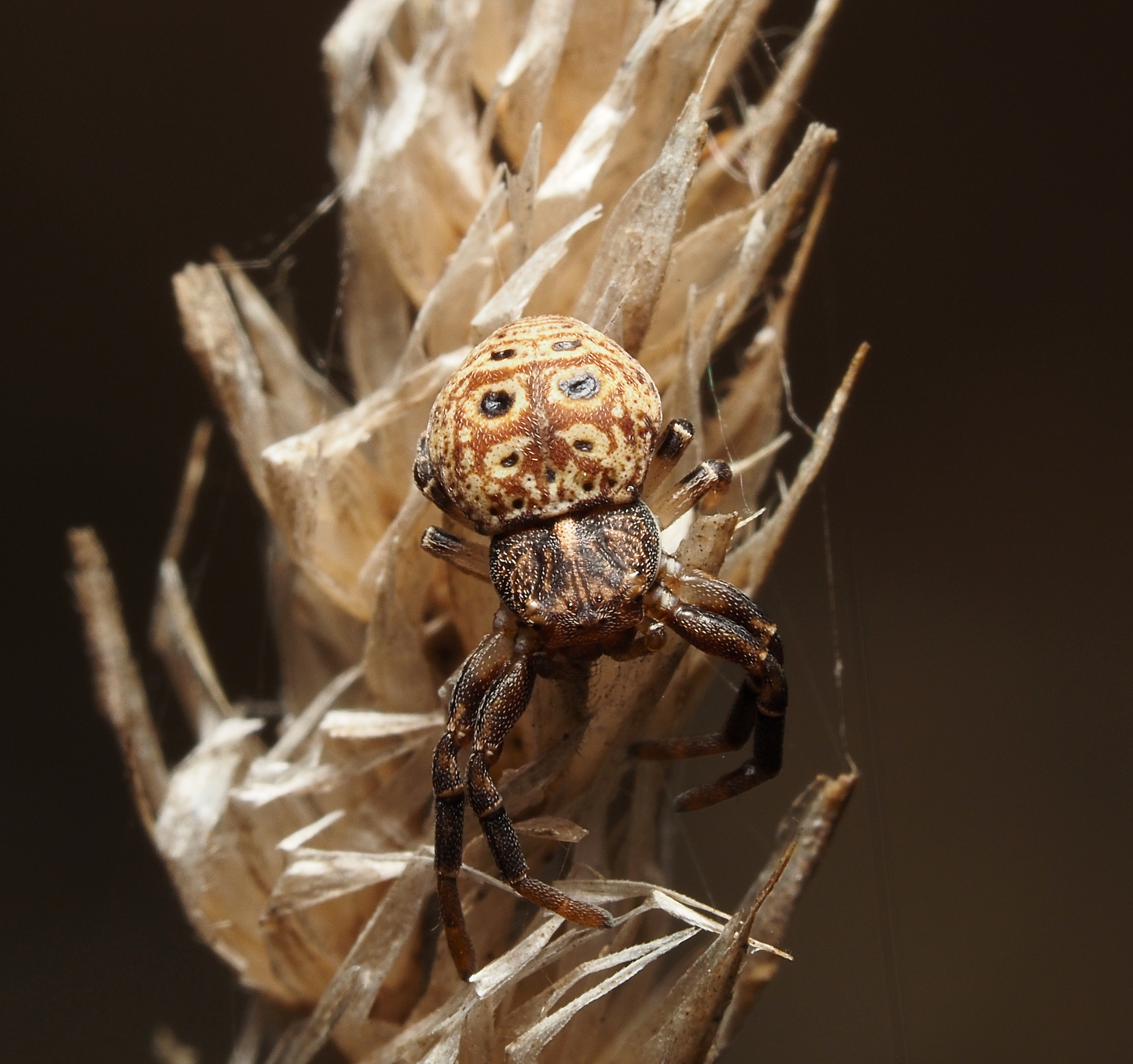

Scientific classification
- Kingdom: Animalia
- Phylum: Arthropoda
- Subphylum: Chelicerata
- Class: Arachnida
- Order: Araneae
- Infraorder: Araneomorphae
- Family: Thomisidae
- Genus: Cymbacha
- Species: C. ocellata

Binomial name
- Cymbacha ocellata L Koch 1874

= Cymbacha ocellata =

Species of spider

Cymbacha ocellata is a spider in the family Thomisidae. The Spider was first described by L Koch in 1874. Common to most parts of Australia
