= Ansie Dippenaar-Schoeman =

South African arachnologist (born 1948)

- Born: 1948 (age 77–78); Roodepoort, Gauteng
- Citizenship: South African
- Education: University of Johannesburg
- Occupations: Zoologist, arachnologist
- Spouse: Nico Dippenaar
- Children: 1
- Awards: National Agricultural Researcher for 1991 (Agricultural Writers Association), Lawrence Award for outstanding contributions to arachnology in Africa (2011)

Anna Sophia "Ansie" Dippenaar-Schoeman (born 1948) is a South African arachnologist who has made significant contributions to the study of spiders and other arachnids in Africa. She is a leading taxonomic authority on the continent's spider fauna and has been instrumental in establishing South Africa as a center for arachnological research.

== Early life and education ==
Dippenaar-Schoeman was born in 1948 in Roodepoort, Gauteng, where her parents operated a shop. She is the middle child of three siblings. When she began secondary education, her family moved to Bronkhorstspruit where they purchased the farm Onverwacht. Her time on the farm, helping her father with outdoor work, fostered her love of nature. Biology was her strongest subject when she matriculated from Erasmus High School in 1965.

She began her career in 1967 as a technical assistant at the Department of Agriculture (later the Agricultural Research Council), where she was assigned to a five-year Dieldrin termite project. She enrolled at the University of South Africa (UNISA) for a BSc degree with Zoology and Psychology as main subjects, completing it in 1971.

Under the mentorship of Dr. Lenie Meyer, Dippenaar-Schoeman completed all her postgraduate degrees at Rand Afrikaans University (now the University of Johannesburg). She earned her BSc honours degree in Zoology in 1974 and completed her MSc thesis on spider populations in strawberries, with special reference to the role of the wolf spider Pardosa crassipalpis in controlling the spider mite Tetranychus cinnabarinus. She completed her MSc cum laude in 1976 and proceeded with her PhD on a revision of some genera of the subfamily Misumeninae (Thomisidae) of southern Africa, which she completed in 1980.

== Career ==
Dippenaar-Schoeman was promoted to Specialist Scientist and Unit Manager of the Arachnology Unit of the Biosystematics Division at the ARC Plant Protection Research Institute in 2003. She retired in 2013 after 46 years of service but continues to work part-time as a mentor and identifies specimens for students and the SANSA project. She holds positions as an extraordinary professor at the University of Pretoria (since 2002) and research assistant at the University of Venda.

== Research contributions ==
Dippenaar-Schoeman's research encompasses taxonomy and systematics, biodiversity, ecology, biology, and predation behavior of arachnids. Her early work focused on the impacts of pesticides on spider diversity and the role of spiders in agroecosystems as biological control agents, research that continued for several decades across various agricultural systems including orchards and cultivated crops.

Her taxonomic expertise centers on crab spiders (Thomisidae), though she has published on numerous other families including Ammoxenidae, Araneidae, Eresidae, Eutichuridae, Hersiliidae, Oxyopidae, Tetragnathidae, Theraphosidae, and Zodariidae. She is recognized internationally as a leading authority on African spider taxonomy and has built an extensive collection of taxonomic literature to facilitate identification work.

== National Collection and SANSA ==
The specimens collected during the Dieldrin project formed the first accessions of the National Collection of Arachnida (NCA). Under Dippenaar-Schoeman's stewardship, this collection has grown to include more than 60,000 accessions representing over 200,000 specimens, making it the largest arachnid collection on the continent.

In 1997, she initiated the South African National Survey of Arachnida (SANSA) in response to South Africa's obligations to the Convention on Biological Diversity. This project focused and coordinated arachnid research in South Africa, involving digitization of museum records, organization of surveys, and attraction of amateur collectors. The project culminated in 2010 with the publication of the "First Atlas of the Spiders of South Africa," documenting detailed locality records for more than 2,000 species.

== Major publications ==
Dippenaar-Schoeman has authored or co-authored numerous scientific publications and field guides. Her most significant works include:

- African Spiders: an Identification Manual (1997), co-authored with Rudy Jocqué
- Spider Families of the World (2006), co-authored with Rudy Jocqué
- First Atlas of the Spiders of South Africa (2010)

== Professional recognition ==
Dippenaar-Schoeman has received numerous awards and honors, including:

- National Agricultural Researcher for 1991 (Agricultural Writers Association)
- Fellow of the Royal Society of South Africa (2008)
- Lawrence Award for outstanding contributions to arachnology in Africa (2011)
- Served as the first female president of the International Society of Arachnology (2004–2007)

She was instrumental in establishing the Research Group for the Study of African Arachnida in 1986, later renamed the African Arachnological Society, serving as chairperson from its establishment until 2008.

== Personal life ==
Dippenaar-Schoeman met her husband, Nico Dippenaar, while working on the Dieldrin project. They married in 1972 and both completed their PhD degrees in 1980. Their daughter, Nicole, was born in 1983 and works as a trauma doctor in Pretoria.

== Taxa named in honour of Ansie Dippenaar-Schoeman ==
A number of species and genera were named after Dippenaar-Schoeman.

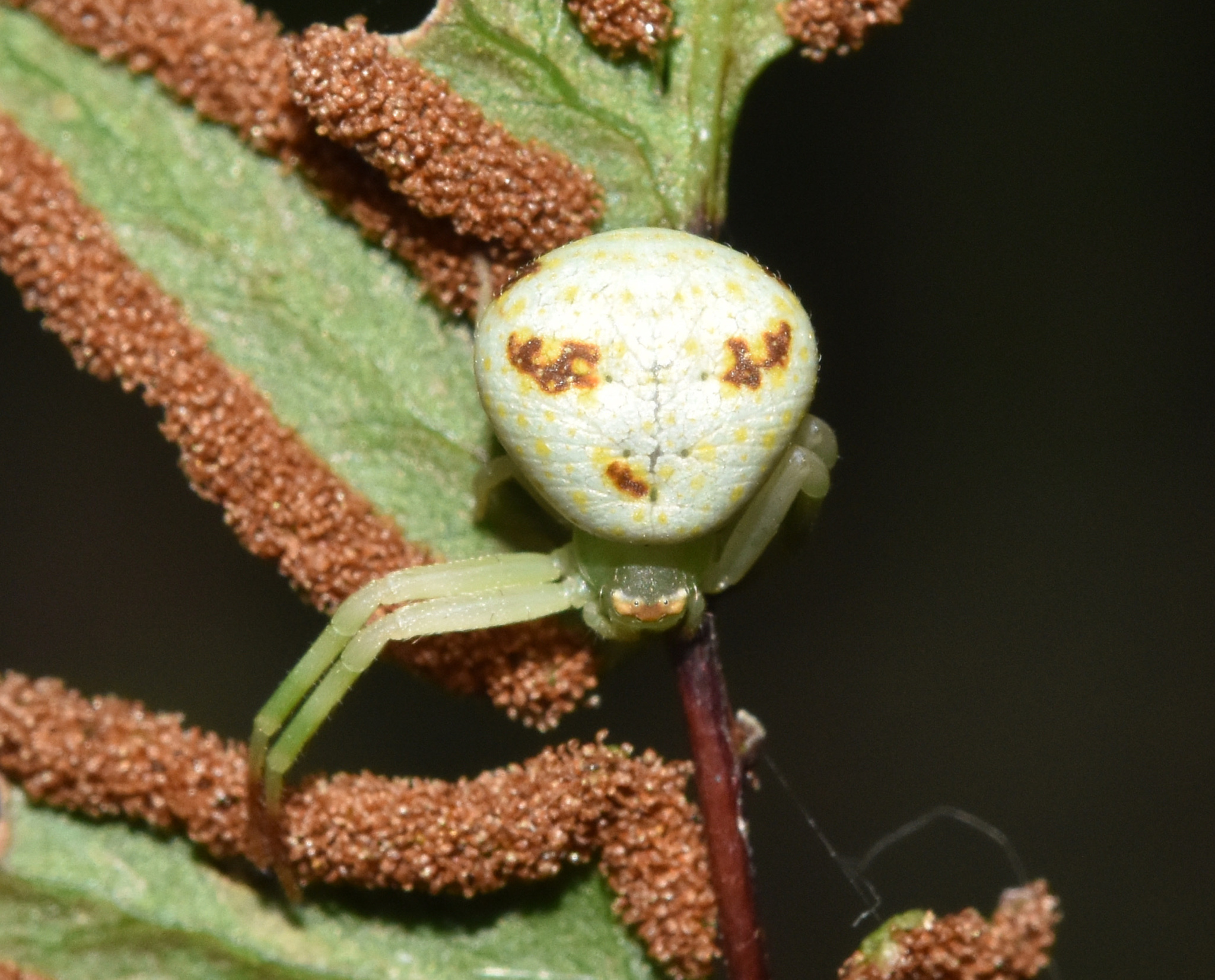
female Ansiea tuckeri

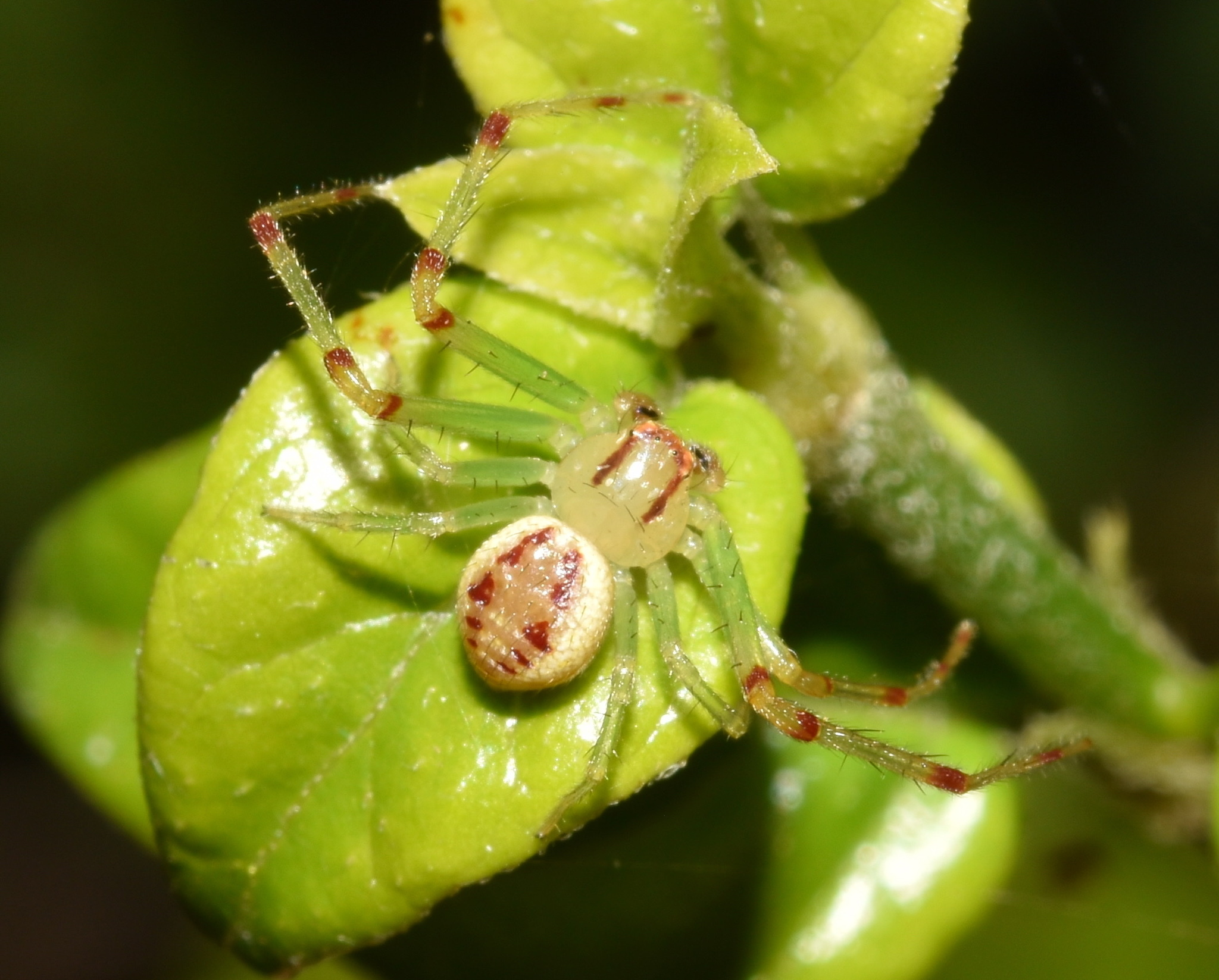
male Ansiea tuckeri

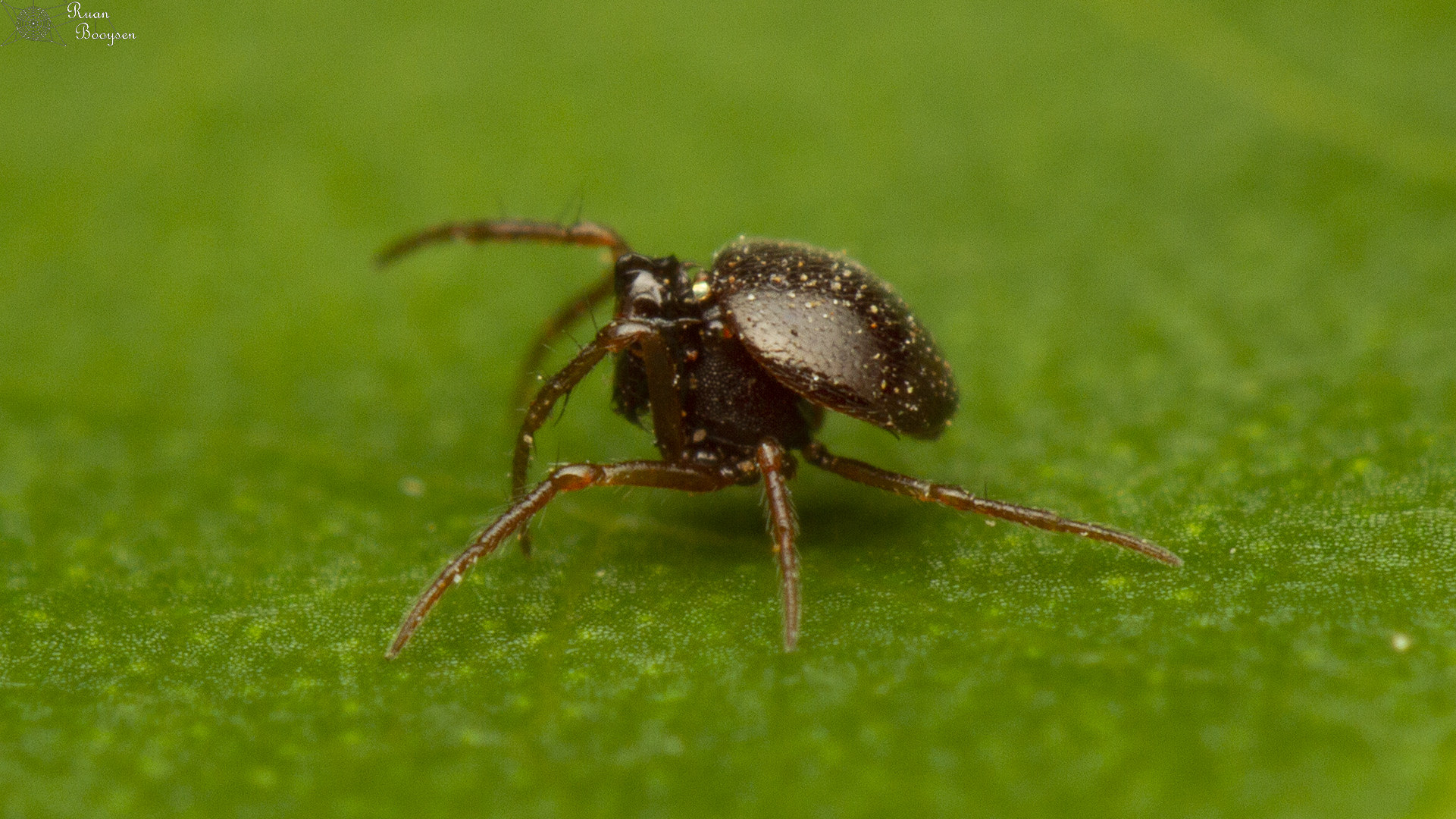
Dippenaaria luxurians

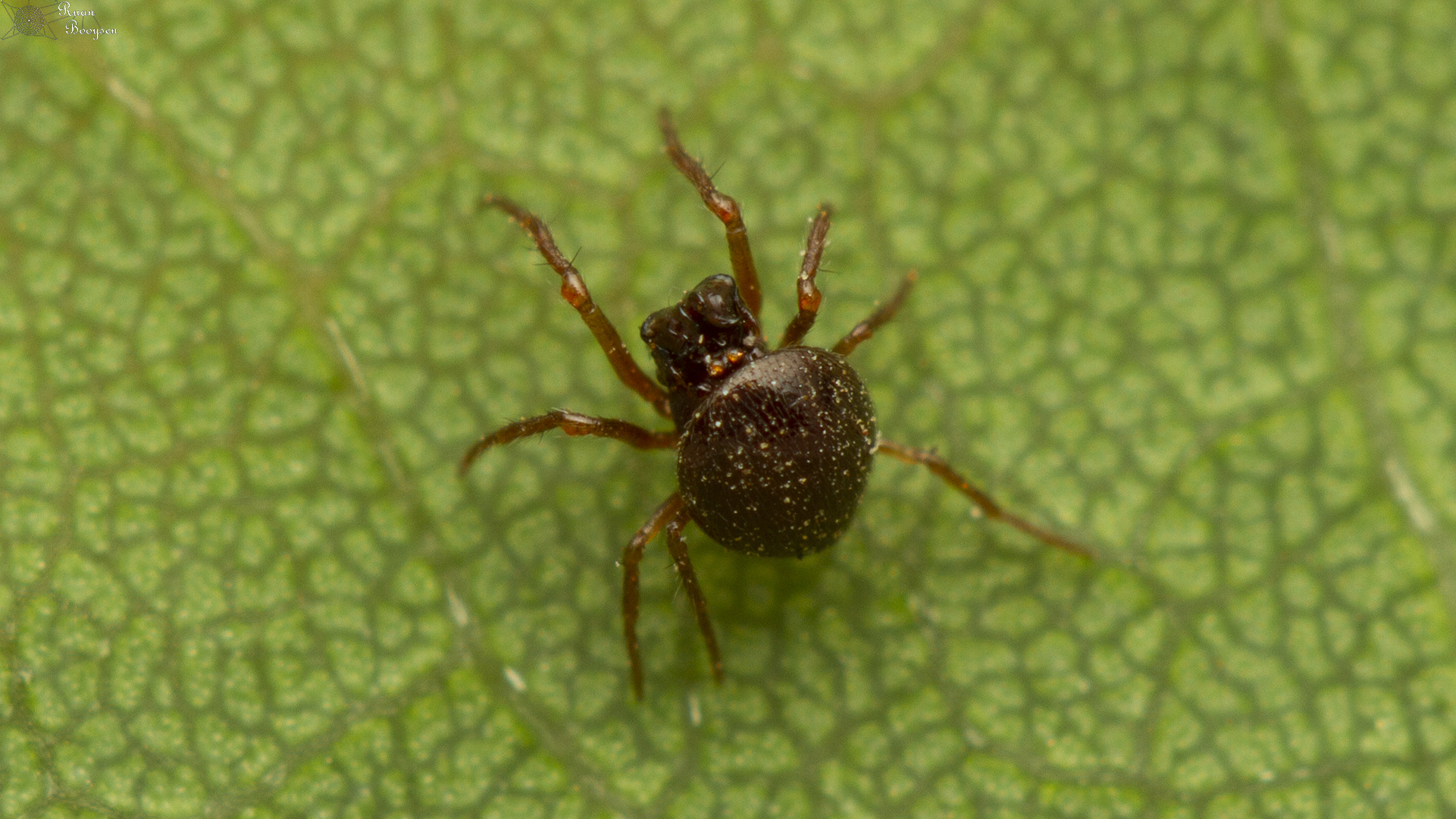

=== Spiders (Araneae) ===
- Acanthinozodium ansieae Jocqué & van Harten, 2015 (Zodariidae)
- Afrarchaea ansieae Lotz, 2015 (Archaeidae)
- Afroceto ansieae Lyle, 2015 (Trachelidae)
- Afroceto dippenaarae Lyle, 2015 (Trachelidae)
- Andoharano ansieae Zonstein & Marusik, 2015 (Filistatidae)
- Ansiea Lehtinen, 2004 (Thomisidae)
- Cambalida dippenaarae Haddad, 2012 (Corinnidae)
- Ceratinopsis dippenaari Jocqué, 1984 (Linyphiidae)
- Cheiracanthium dippenaarae Lotz, 2007 (Cheiracanthiidae)
- Cheiramiona ansieae Lotz, 2003 (Cheiracanthiidae)
- Cithaeron dippenaarae Bosmans & Van Keer, 2015 (Cithaeronidae)
- Cydrela schoemanae Jocqué, 1991 (Zodariidae)
- Diploglena dippenaarae Haddad, 2015 (Caponiidae)
- Dippenaaria Wunderlich, 1995 (Anapidae)
- Eusparassus schoemanae Moradmand, 2013 (Sparassidae)
- Geraesta ansieae Benjamin, 2015 (Thomisidae)
- Hortipes schoemanae Bosselaers & Jocqué, 2000 (Corinnidae)
- May ansie Jäger, 2015 (Sparassidae)
- Palystes ansiedippenaarae Croeser, 1996 (Sparassidae)
- Pasilobus dippenaarae Roff & Haddad, 2015 (Araneidae)
- Prima ansieae Foord, 2008 (Hersiliidae)
- Pseudomicrommata schoemanae Moradmand, 2015 (Sparassidae)
- Ranops dippenaarae Russell-Smith & Jocqué, 2015 (Zodariidae)
- Selenops ansieae Corronca, 2002 (Selenopidae)
- Spermophora schoemanae Huber, 2003 (Pholcidae)
- Tusitala ansieae Azarkina & Foord, 2015 (Salticidae)

=== Other arachnids ===
- Linotetranus annae Meyer & Ueckermann, 1997 (Linotetranidae) (Spider mite)
- Melanoblossia ansie Bird & Wharton, 2015 (Melanoblossiidae) (Sun spider)
- Sphaerowithius ansieae Harvey & Mahnert, 2015 (Withiidae) (Pseudoscorpion)
- Uroplectes ansiedippenaarae Prendini, 2015 (Buthidae) (Scorpion)
