= Orange lungless spider =

Orange lungless spider refers to the following genera:

- Caponia, the eight-eyed orange lungless spiders
- Diploglena, the two-eyed orange lungless spider
