= Ansienulina =

Scientific classification
- Kingdom: Animalia
- Phylum: Arthropoda
- Subphylum: Chelicerata
- Class: Arachnida
- Order: Araneae
- Infraorder: Araneomorphae
- Family: Salticidae
- Subfamily: Salticinae
- Genus: Ansienulina; Wesołowska, 2015
- Species: A. mirabilis

Binomial name
- Ansienulina mirabilis Wesołowska, 2015

Genus of spiders

Ansienulina is a genus of spiders in the jumping spider family Salticidae. It was first described in 2015 by Wanda Wesołowska. This genus was named in honour of South African arachnologist Ansie Dippenaar-Schoeman. As of 2017, it contains only one species, Ansienulina mirabilis, found in Kenya, Angola, and Namibia.

Wesołowska placed the genus in the subfamily Thiratoscirtinae, which Maddison reduced to the subtribe Thiratoscirtina in the Salticoida clade of the subfamily Salticinae.
