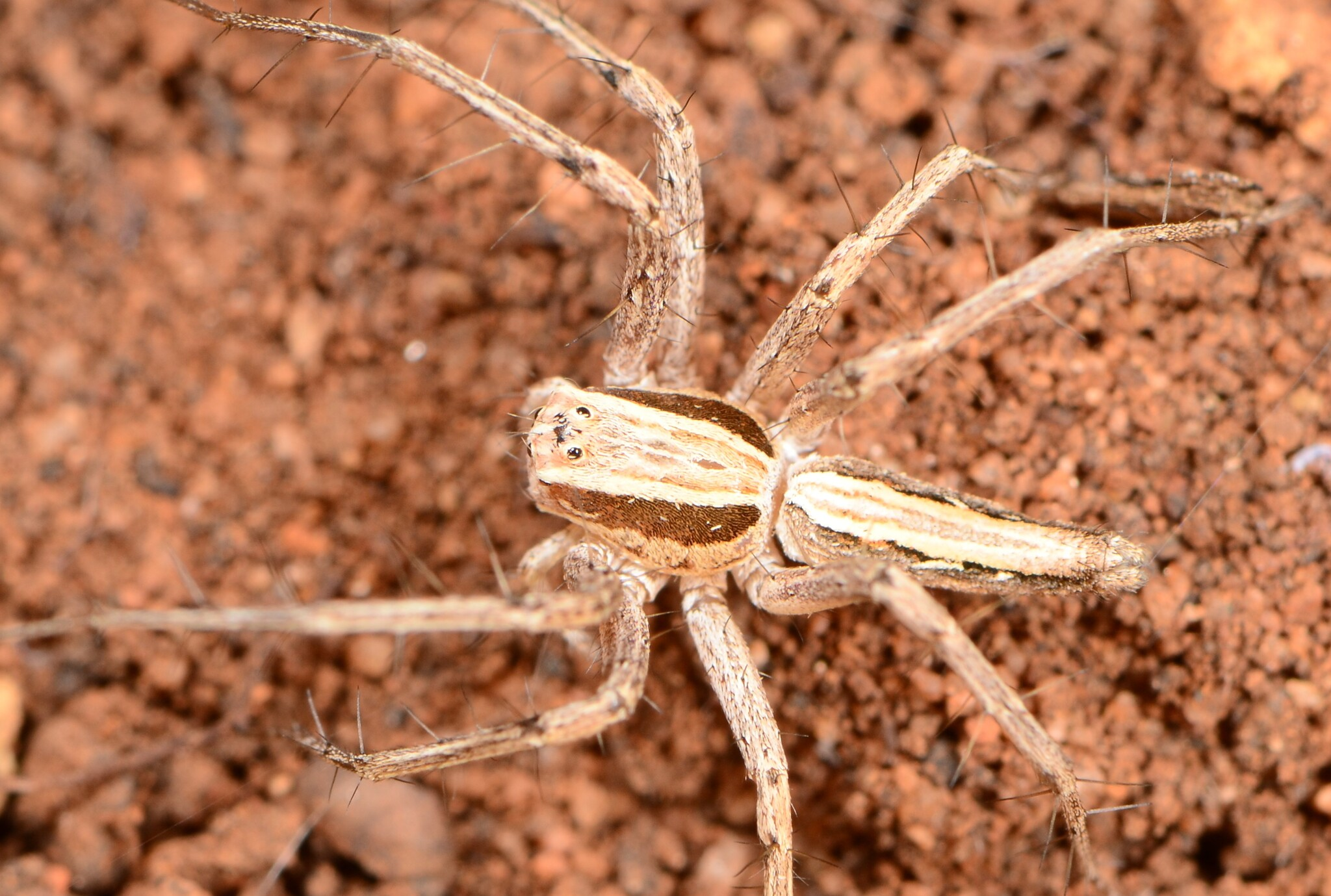
- female
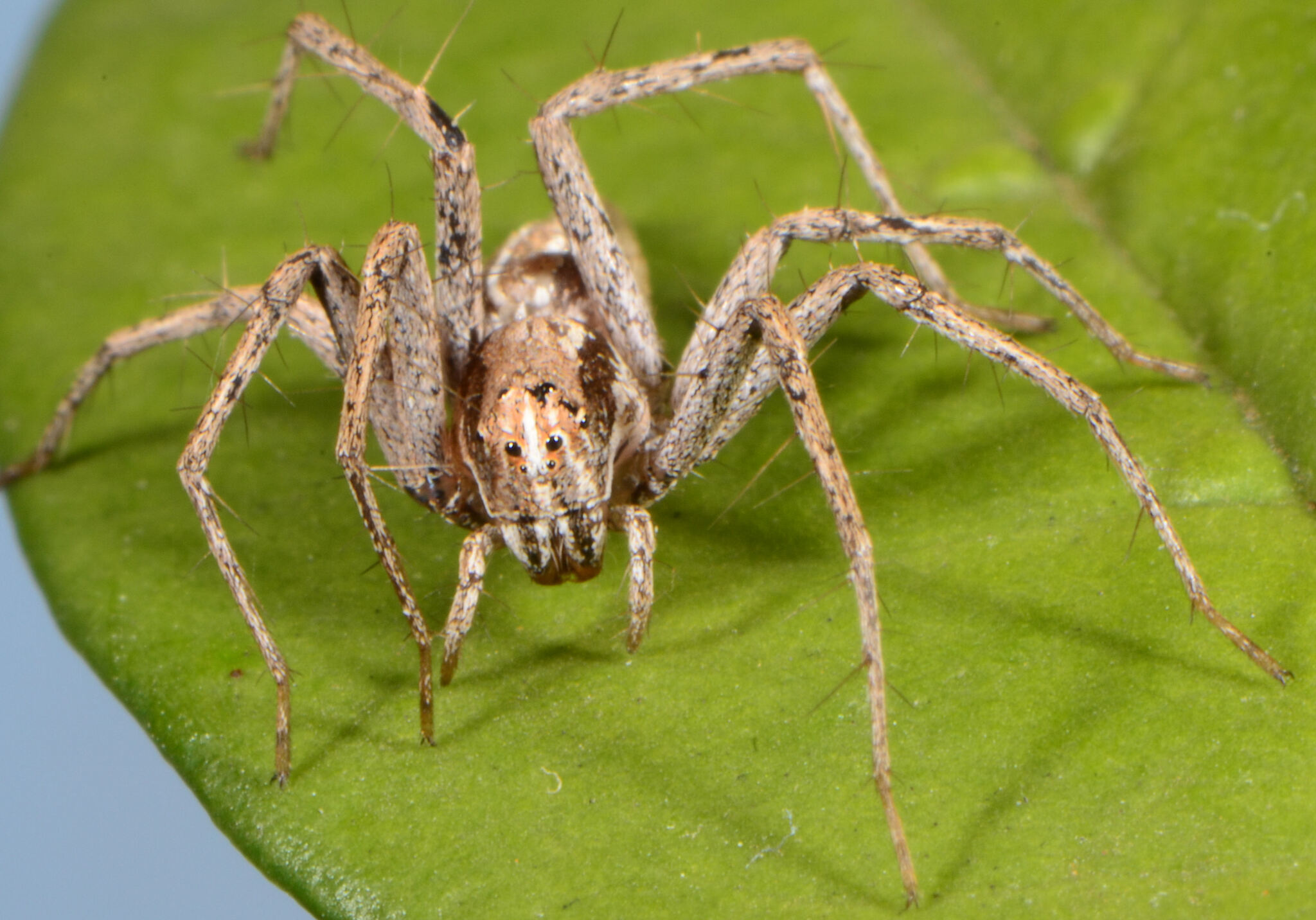
- female

Scientific classification
- Kingdom: Animalia
- Phylum: Arthropoda
- Subphylum: Chelicerata
- Class: Arachnida
- Order: Araneae
- Infraorder: Araneomorphae
- Family: Oxyopidae
- Genus: Oxyopes
- Species: O. jacksoni

Binomial name
- Oxyopes jacksoni Lessert, 1915

= Oxyopes jacksoni =

Jackson's Long-bodied Lynx Spider

Species of spider

Oxyopes jacksoni is a species of spider in the family Oxyopidae. It is commonly known as Jackson's long-bodied lynx spider.

== Distribution ==
Oxyopes jacksoni occurs in Tanzania, Malawi, Botswana, Zimbabwe, and South Africa. In South Africa, the species has been recorded from seven provinces at altitudes ranging from 7 to 1,722 m above sea level.

== Habitat and ecology ==
The species is commonly found on grasses across multiple biomes including Forest, Fynbos, Grassland, and Savanna biomes. It has also been collected from various agricultural crops including citrus, macadamia, maize, and sunflowers, showing remarkable adaptability to human-modified environments.

== Description ==
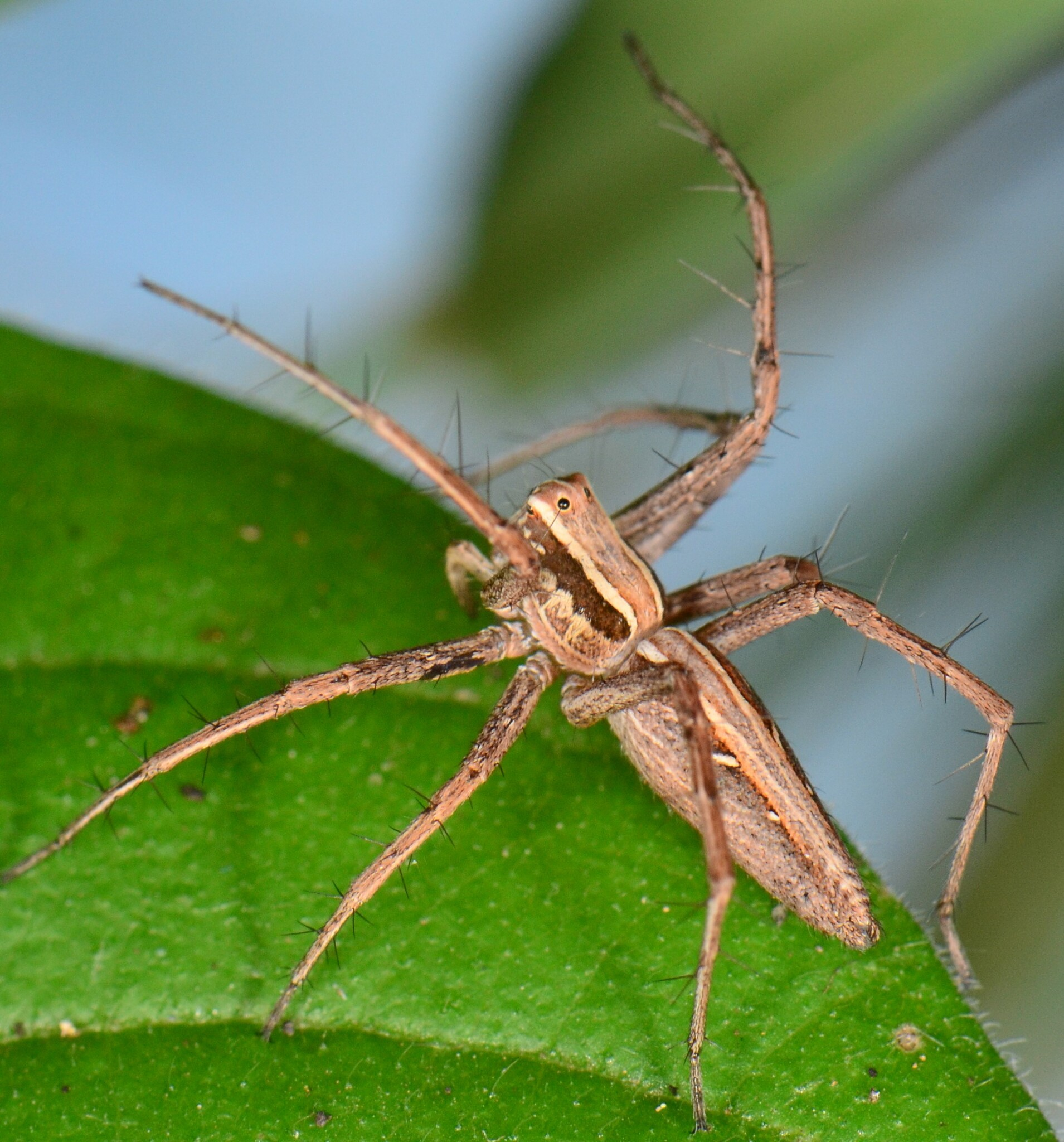

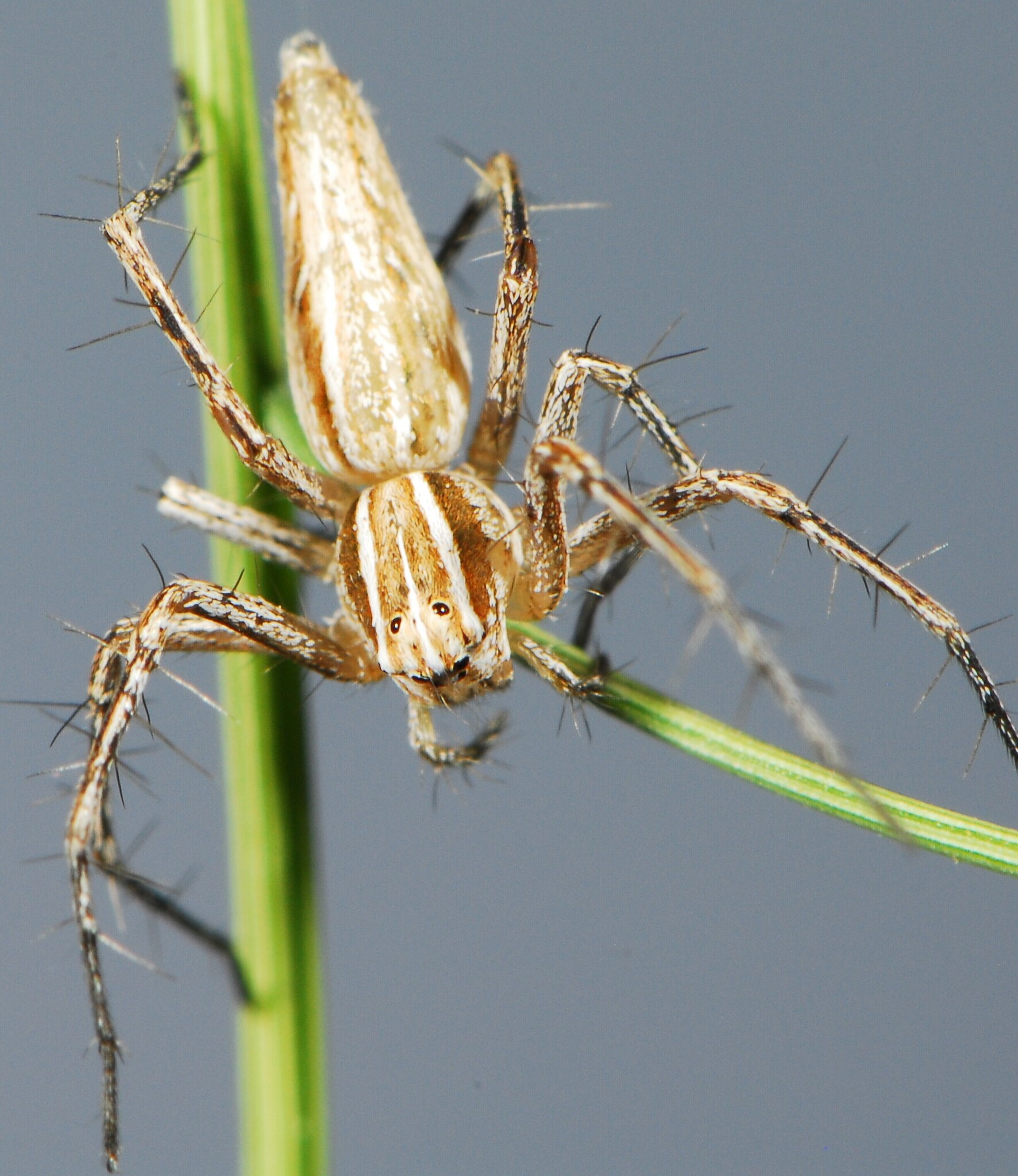

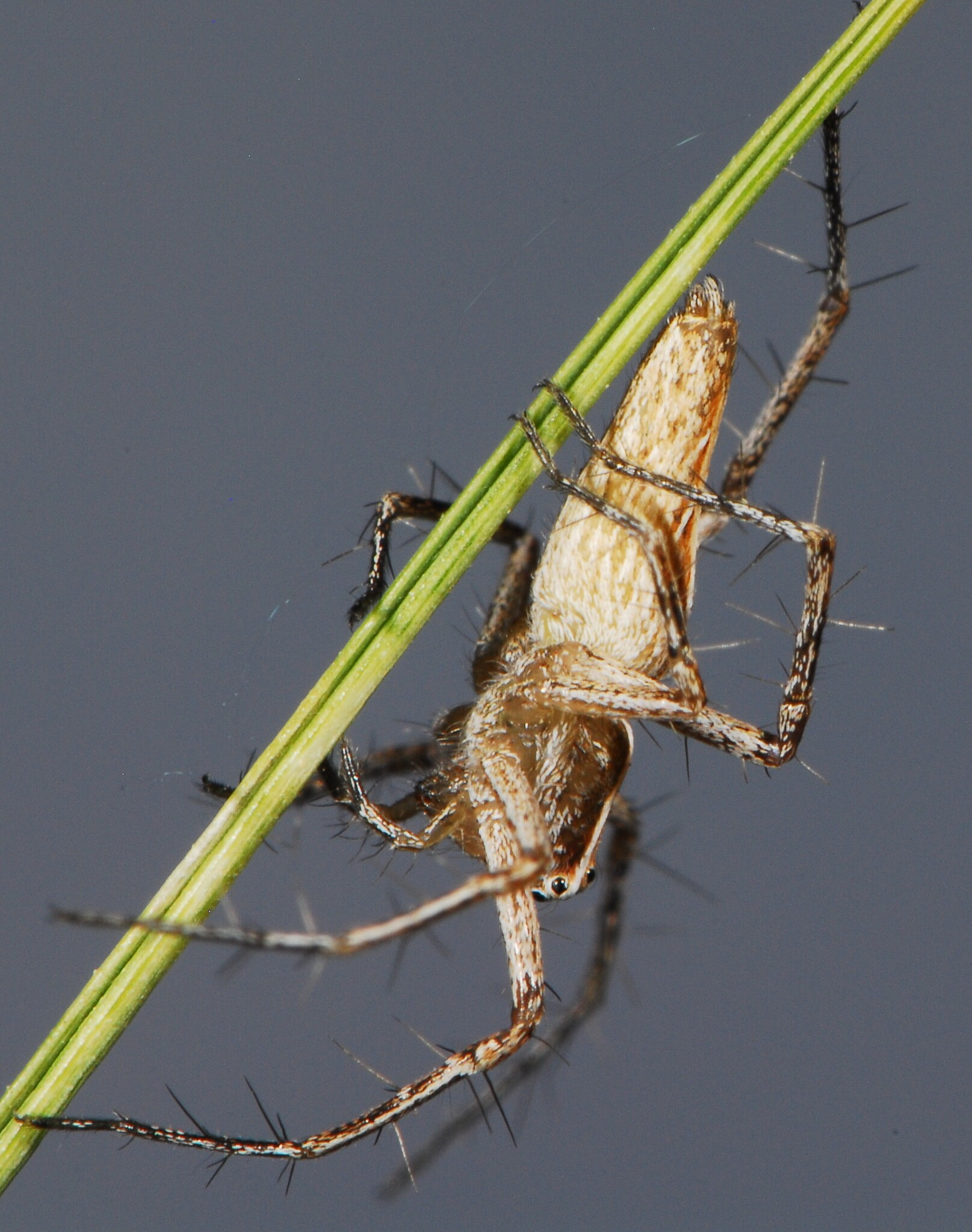

Oxyopes jacksoni is known from both sexes. Like other members of the genus, it exhibits the characteristic lynx spider morphology with long, slender legs bearing prominent spines and an elongated opisthosoma that tapers posteriorly.

== Conservation ==
Oxyopes jacksoni is listed as Least Concern by the South African National Biodiversity Institute due to its wide geographic range across multiple African countries. The species is protected in more than twelve protected areas and faces no significant threats.

== Taxonomy ==
The species has not undergone recent taxonomic revision but is well-established in the literature. Additional taxonomic information was published by Dippenaar-Schoeman et al. in 2025.
