= Diploglena major =

Northern Two-Eyed Orange Lungless Spider

Conservation status
- Least Concern (SANBI Red List)

Scientific classification
- Kingdom: Animalia
- Phylum: Arthropoda
- Subphylum: Chelicerata
- Class: Arachnida
- Order: Araneae
- Infraorder: Araneomorphae
- Family: Caponiidae
- Genus: Diploglena
- Species: D. major

Binomial name
- Diploglena major Lawrence, 1928

Synonyms
- Diploglena capensis major Lawrence, 1928

Species of spider

Diploglena major is a species of spider of the genus Diploglena. It is found in Namibia, Botswana, and South Africa.

== Taxonomy ==
The species was originally described as Diploglena capensis major by Reginald Frederick Lawrence in 1928 from Namibia. It was elevated to full species status by Haddad in 2015.

== Distribution ==
Diploglena major is known only from the Limpopo province in South Africa, where it is protected in the Limpopo Valley National Park.

== Habitat ==
The species is a free-living ground dweller sampled in pitfall traps from the Savanna Biome.

== Conservation ==
Diploglena major is listed as Least Concern due to its wide geographical range in southern Africa. The species is found at elevations ranging from 531 to 605 metres above sea level.

The species is protected in the Limpopo Valley National Park.

== Description ==
Both sexes are known for this species.
