= Pasilobus dippenaarae =

Scientific classification
- Kingdom: Animalia
- Phylum: Arthropoda
- Subphylum: Chelicerata
- Class: Arachnida
- Order: Araneae
- Infraorder: Araneomorphae
- Family: Araneidae
- Genus: Pasilobus
- Species: P. dippenaarae

Binomial name
- Pasilobus dippenaarae Roff & Haddad, 2015

Species of spider

Pasilobus dippenaarae is a species of spider in the family Araneidae. It is endemic to KwaZulu-Natal Province in South Africa.

== Distribution ==
Pasilobus dippenaarae is a KwaZulu-Natal Province endemic described in 2015 from Hilton College Nature Reserve. The species has also been sampled from three other localities around Hilton and Pietermaritzburg at altitudes ranging from 634 to 1,521 m above sea level. Specific localities include Cumberland Nature Reserve, Gwen's Valley at Hilton College Nature Reserve, National Botanical Garden, and Pietermaritzburg (Boughton).

== Habitat and ecology ==
The species was observed during the day in the field while resting on the upper surfaces of leaves, fully visible during the day and strongly resembling bird droppings. It had made a thin covering of silk threads on which it was sitting. The spiders were found about 2 m above the ground in leafy branches. They build a web at night close to bushes and small trees. The more-or-less horizontal web has a triangular frame that is divided into halves by a midline thread running from the apical angle to bisect the base. From the midline thread hang 4–11 pairs of widely spaced spanning threads, which are the only adhesive elements in the web. The species has been sampled from the Savanna biome.

== Conservation ==
Pasilobus dippenaarae is listed as Data Deficient for taxonomic purposes. More sampling is needed to collect the male and determine the species' range. The species is protected in the National Botanical Garden. There are no known threats.

== Etymology ==
The species is named after Ansie Dippenaar-Schoeman, a prominent South African arachnologist who has made significant contributions to the study of southern African spiders.

== Taxonomy ==
The species was described by Roff and Haddad in 2015 from KwaZulu-Natal. It is known only from the female.
