= Ansienulina mirabilis =

Scientific classification
- Kingdom: Animalia
- Phylum: Arthropoda
- Subphylum: Chelicerata
- Class: Arachnida
- Order: Araneae
- Infraorder: Araneomorphae
- Family: Salticidae
- Genus: Ansienulina
- Species: A. mirabilis

Binomial name
- Ansienulina mirabilis Wesołowska, 2015

Species of spider

Ansienulina mirabilis is a species of jumping spiders. It is the only species in the genus Ansienulina.

== Distribution ==
A. mirabilis has been discovered in Angola, Kenya and Namibia. It probably lives on the ground in tree-covered areas.

== History ==
A. mirabilis was first described by Wanda Wesołowska in 2015. The species is the same or similar to an example of Eustiromastix major identified by Eugène Simon in 1903.

== Description ==
The spider is very small, with a cephalothorax that measures between 1.5 and 2.1 mm (0.059 and 0.083 in) long and an abdomen between 1.3 and 2.1 mm (0.051 and 0.083 in) long. The male spider is dark yellow to light brown, while the female has an orange-brown carapace and greyish beige abdomen, with Kenyan examples being generally darker.
