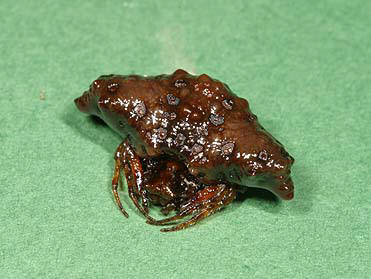
- Female

Scientific classification
- Kingdom: Animalia
- Phylum: Arthropoda
- Subphylum: Chelicerata
- Class: Arachnida
- Order: Araneae
- Infraorder: Araneomorphae
- Family: Araneidae
- Genus: Pasilobus
- Species: P. hupingensis

Binomial name
- Pasilobus hupingensis Yin, Bao & Kim, 2001

= Pasilobus hupingensis =

Species of spider

Pasilobus hupingensis is a species of spider in the orb-weaver spider family Araneidae, found in China and Japan. Females of the genus Pasilobus construct "spanning-thread webs" with only two sectors, making them appear triangular. Widely spaced threads with sticky drops span the three radii of these webs. One end is attached in such a way that it readily breaks free. When a prey item is caught on one of these threads, the line parts at this end and the prey hangs from the web until it is hauled up by the spider.

== Description ==
Adult females have a total body length of about 8–9 mm. Overall, the body is dark reddish brown, with the carapace and sternum being darker than the abdomen. The carapace is about 3.2–3.4 mm wide and about the same length. The legs are brownish with yellowish brown markings or vice versa. The first leg is longest at about 7.5–8.7 mm in total. The abdomen is about 6.3–6.7 mm long and 13.0–14.4 mm wide with complex markings. It has many protuberances and sigillae. The epigyne is more or less rectangular with a hardened rim to the rear. There is no obvious scape. Adult males are darker and smaller, with a total body length of about 2.3–2.8 mm. The conductor of the palpal bulb wraps around the apex of the embolus and the median apophysis is hook-shaped.

== Taxonomy ==
Pasilobus hupingensis was first described in 2001. The species was discovered in a study of the spiders of Hunan, China. The specific name hupingensis is based on the type locality, Mount Huping in Shimen County. The similarity of the species to Pasilobus bufoninus was noted. Only the female was known in 2001. In 2006, spiders from Japan initially identified as Pasilobus bufoninus were shown to be P. hupingensis, extending the distribution of the species from China to Japan. Adult males were identified as the same species by their DNA.

== Distribution ==
As of January 2021, the species had been found in China and Japan. It is rare in Japan, and was only discovered in China in 2001.
