= Lawrencega =

Scientific classification
- Domain: Eukaryota
- Kingdom: Animalia
- Phylum: Arthropoda
- Subphylum: Chelicerata
- Class: Arachnida
- Order: Solifugae
- Family: Melanoblossiidae
- Genus: Lawrencega; Roewer, 1933

Type species
- Lawrencega hewitti (Lawrence, 1929)

Species
- 7, see text

Genus of camel spiders

Lawrencega is a genus of melanoblossiid camel spiders, first described by Carl Friedrich Roewer in 1933.

== Species ==
As of March 2023, the World Solifugae Catalog accepts the following seven species:

- Lawrencega hamiltoni Lawrence, 1972 — Namibia
- Lawrencega hewitti (Lawrence, 1929) — South Africa
- Lawrencega longitarsis Lawrence, 1967 — Namibia
- Lawrencega minuta Wharton, 1981 — Namibia
- Lawrencega procera Wharton, 1981 — Namibia
- Lawrencega solaris Wharton, 1981 — Namibia
- Lawrencega tripilosa Lawrence, 1968 — South Africa
