= Diploglena proxila =

Vredenburg Two-Eyed Orange Lungless Spider

Conservation status
- Critically endangered (SANBI Red List)

Scientific classification
- Kingdom: Animalia
- Phylum: Arthropoda
- Subphylum: Chelicerata
- Class: Arachnida
- Order: Araneae
- Infraorder: Araneomorphae
- Family: Caponiidae
- Genus: Diploglena
- Species: D. proxila

Binomial name
- Diploglena proxila Haddad, 2015

Species of spider

Diploglena proxila is a species of spider of the genus Diploglena. It is endemic to the Western Cape province of South Africa.

== Distribution ==
Diploglena proxila is known only from the type locality at Vredenburg on farm Besters Kraal.

== Habitat ==
The species is a free-living ground dweller sampled by hand from beneath rocks and plants in the Fynbos Biome.

== Conservation ==
Diploglena proxila is listed as Critically Endangered under criterion B. The species is known only from the type locality at an elevation of 126 metres above sea level. The status remains obscure and more sampling is needed to determine the species range.

A precautionary assessment of Critically Endangered is assigned due to high levels of habitat transformation at the only known location. The only known population is threatened by loss of habitat to crop cultivation. The farm Bester's Kraal on the Vredenburg Peninsula where this species was collected has lost 80% of natural habitat to crop cultivation.

== Description ==
Both males and females are known for this species.

Like other species in this genus, Diploglena proxila has two eyes. The male holotype measures 5.75 mm (0.226 in) and the female paratype measures 7.50 mm (0.295 in).
