= Diploglena dippenaarae =

Dippenaar's Two-Eyed Orange Lungless Spider

Conservation status
- Endangered (SANBI Red List)

Scientific classification
- Kingdom: Animalia
- Phylum: Arthropoda
- Subphylum: Chelicerata
- Class: Arachnida
- Order: Araneae
- Infraorder: Araneomorphae
- Family: Caponiidae
- Genus: Diploglena
- Species: D. dippenaarae

Binomial name
- Diploglena dippenaarae Haddad, 2015

Species of spider

Diploglena dippenaarae is a species of spider of the genus Diploglena. It is endemic to the Western Cape province of South Africa.

== Etymology ==
The species is named in honour of Ansie Dippenaar-Schoeman, a prominent South African arachnologist who has made significant contributions to the study of African spiders.

== Distribution ==
Diploglena dippenaarae is known only from two localities near Saldanha Bay: Jacobsbaai and Saldanha. The species appears to have a very restricted distribution.

== Habitat ==
The species is a free-living ground dweller sampled at night from leaf litter in coastal Fynbos Biome.

== Conservation ==
Diploglena dippenaarae is listed as Endangered under criterion B due to its restricted distribution. The species is only known from two localities near Saldanha Bay at elevations ranging from 3 to 8 metres above sea level. It appears to have a restricted distribution and more sampling is needed to determine the species range. A precautionary status of Endangered is assigned due to high rates of habitat transformation taking place at the two known locations.

== Description ==
Both males and females are known for this species.
