= Spiniculosa =

Scientific classification
- Kingdom: Animalia
- Phylum: Arthropoda
- Subphylum: Chelicerata
- Class: Arachnida
- Order: Araneae
- Infraorder: Araneomorphae
- Family: Lycosidae
- Genus: Spiniculosa; Kronestedt, 2025

Type species
- Pardosa crassipalpis Purcell, 1903

Diversity
- 2 species

Genus of spiders

Spiniculosa is an African genus of wolf spiders in the family Lycosidae with two described species.

== Species ==
As of October 2025, this genus includes two species:

- Spiniculosa albida Kronestedt, 2025 – Kenya
- Spiniculosa crassipalpis (Purcell, 1903) – Ethiopia, DR Congo, Kenya, Tanzania, Namibia, Botswana, Zimbabwe, South Africa (type species)
