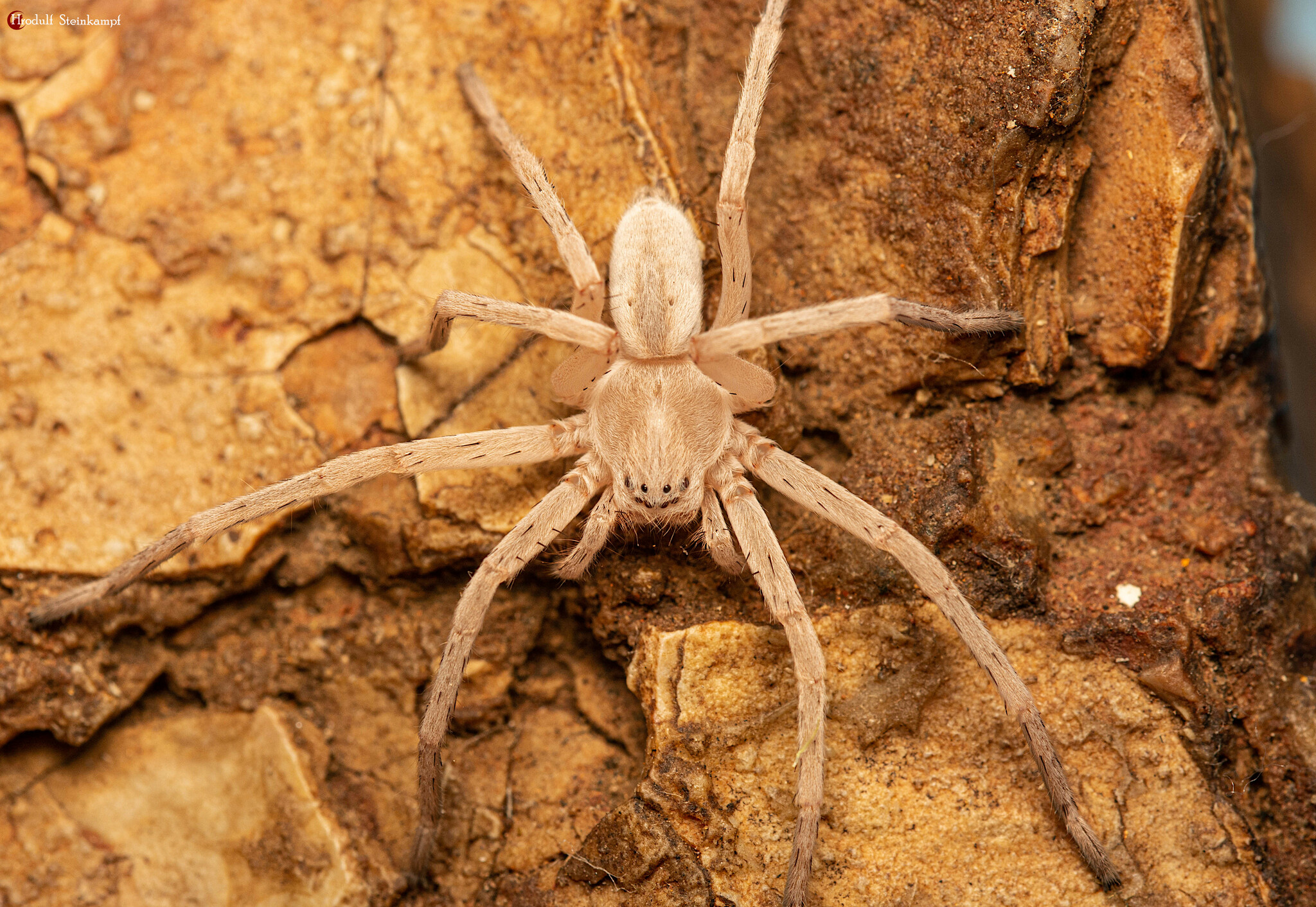

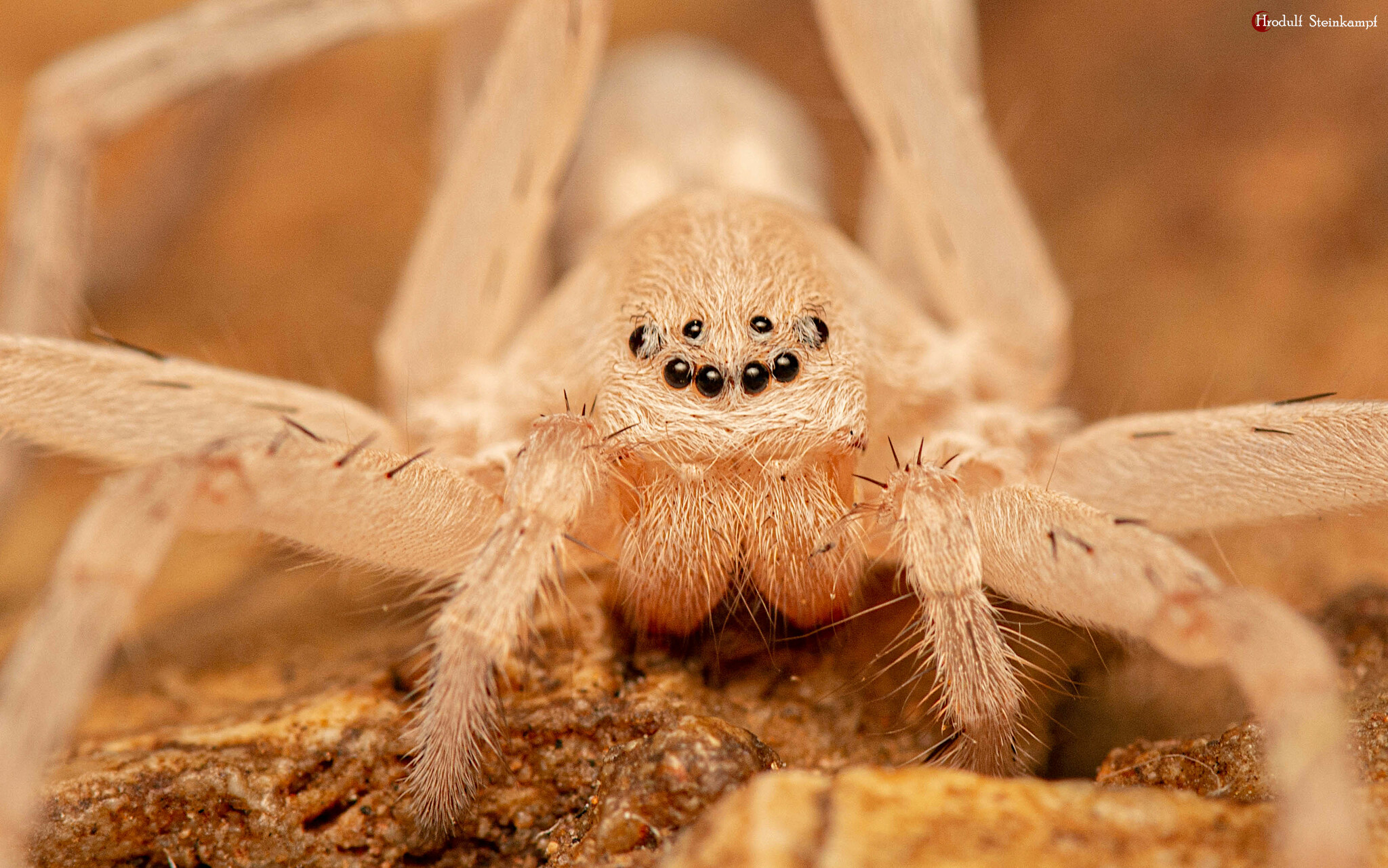

Scientific classification
- Kingdom: Animalia
- Phylum: Arthropoda
- Subphylum: Chelicerata
- Class: Arachnida
- Order: Araneae
- Infraorder: Araneomorphae
- Family: Sparassidae
- Genus: May
- Species: M. bruno

Binomial name
- May bruno Jäger & Krehenwinkel, 2015

= May bruno =

Witsand Huntsman Spider

Species of spider

May bruno is a species of spider in the family Sparassidae. It is endemic to South Africa and is commonly known as the Witsand huntsman spider.

== Distribution ==
May bruno is endemic to the Northern Cape province of South Africa. It is known from Witsand Nature Reserve, Kgalagadi Transfrontier Park at Twee Rivieren, and Postmasburg.

== Habitat and ecology ==
The species inhabits the Nama Karoo biome at elevations ranging from 928 to 1,316 m above sea level. It is found in white sand dunes where they dig burrows leading 20–30 cm into the ground. The burrow is closed with a lid. The specialised elongated hairs situated in a row on the pedipalps are most likely functionally connected to this digging behaviour.

== Description ==
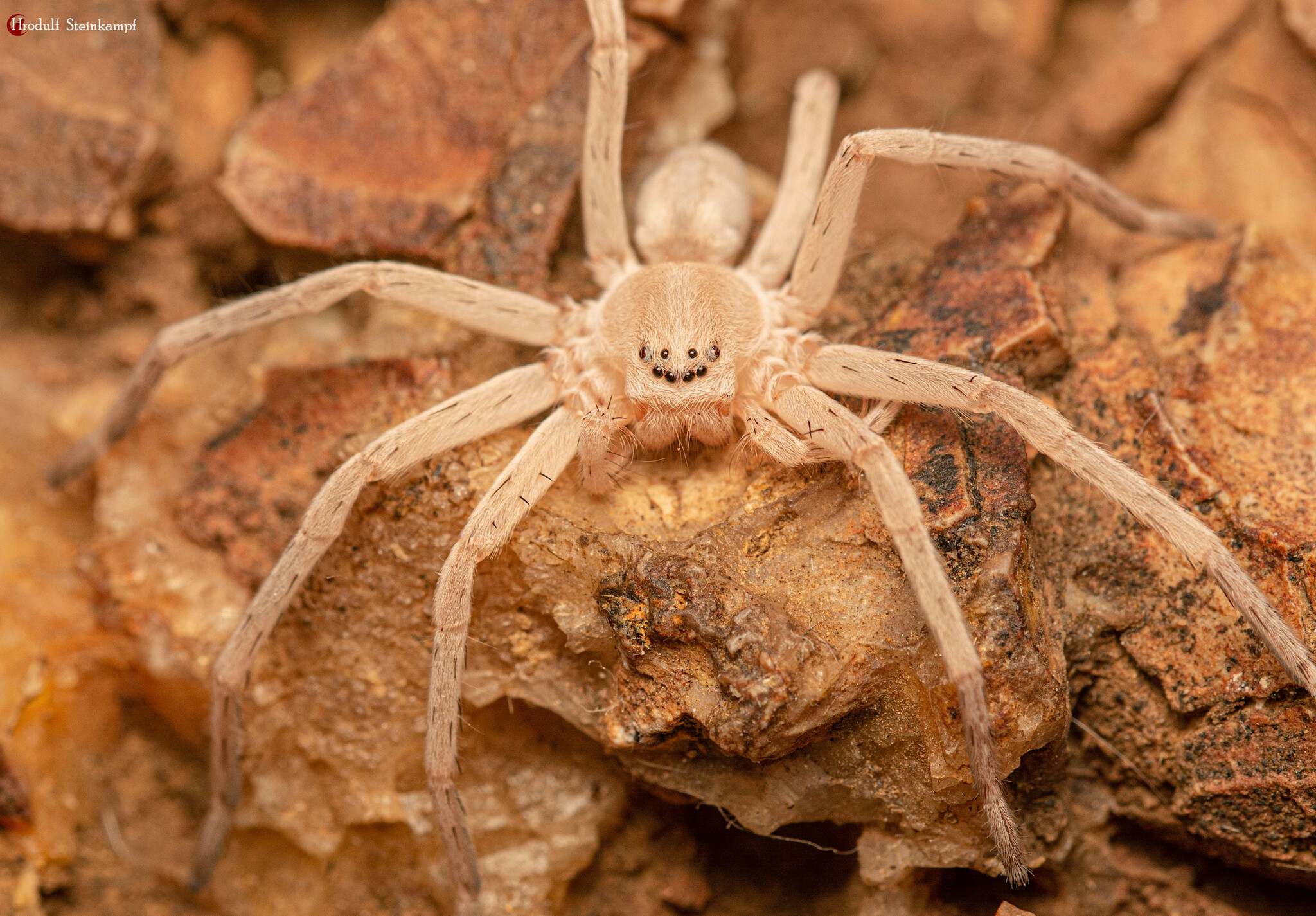

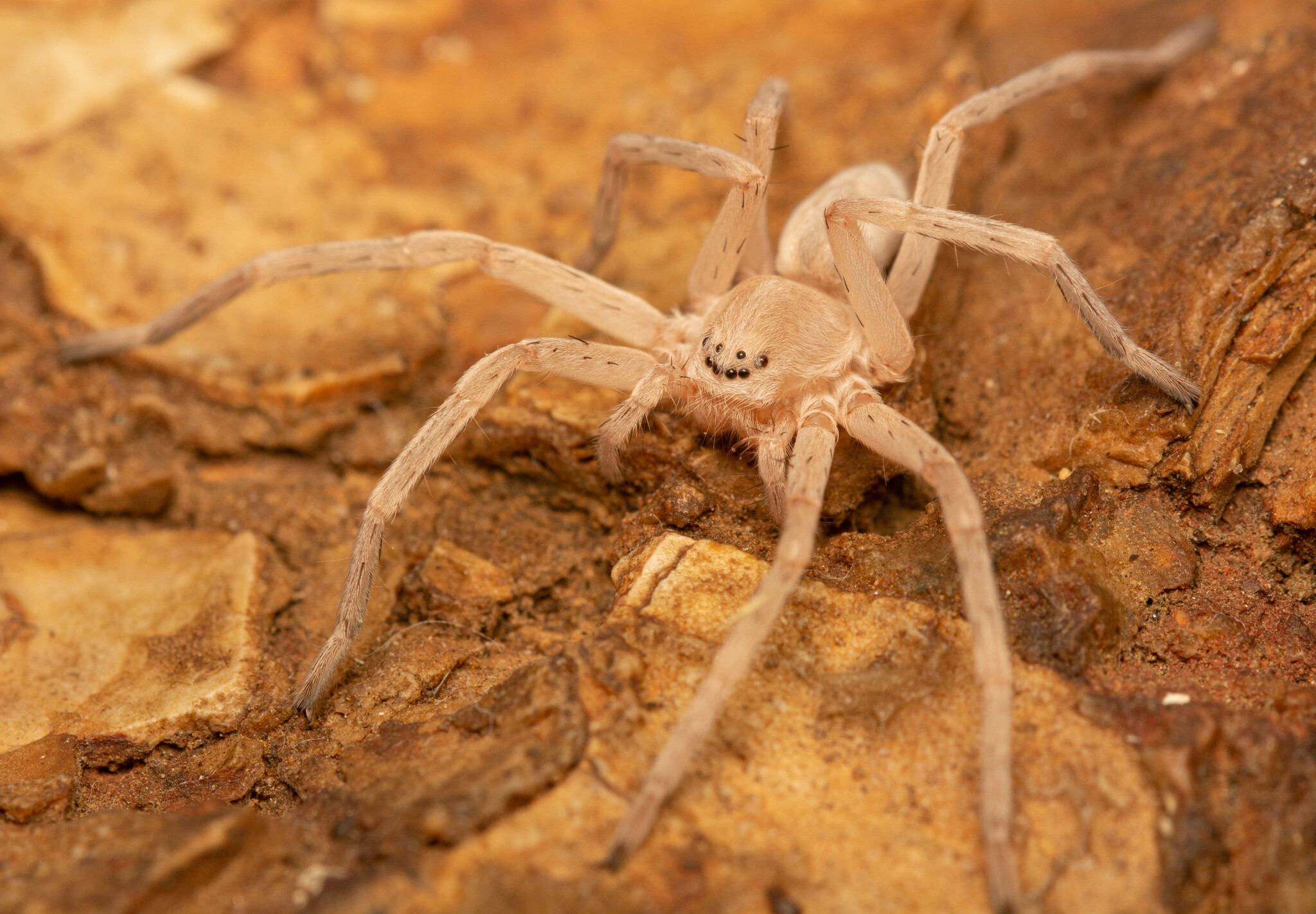

== Conservation ==
May bruno is listed as least concern by the South African National Biodiversity Institute. The species is only known from protected areas and has no recorded threats. It is protected in the Kgalagadi Transfrontier Park and Witsand Nature Reserve.

== Taxonomy ==
The species was described by Jäger & Krehenwinkel in 2015 as the type species of the new genus May.
