= Pasilobus bufoninus =

Scientific classification
- Kingdom: Animalia
- Phylum: Arthropoda
- Subphylum: Chelicerata
- Class: Arachnida
- Order: Araneae
- Infraorder: Araneomorphae
- Family: Araneidae
- Genus: Pasilobus
- Species: P. bufoninus

Binomial name
- Pasilobus bufoninus (Simon, 1867)

Synonyms
- Micrathena bufonina Simon, 1867

Species of spider

Pasilobus bufoninus is a species of spider in the orb-weaver spider family Araneidae, found in Taiwan and Indonesia (Java and the Moluccas).

== Taxonomy ==
Pasilobus bufoninus was first described by Eugène Simon in 1867, as Micrathena bufonina. In 1895, he transferred it to his new genus Pasilobus, of which it is the type species. Spiders from Japan that had been identified as Pasilobus bufoninus were shown in 2006 to be P. hupingensis, removing Japan from the distribution of P. bufoninus.
