= Melanoblossia =

Scientific classification
- Kingdom: Animalia
- Phylum: Arthropoda
- Subphylum: Chelicerata
- Class: Arachnida
- Order: Solifugae
- Family: Melanoblossiidae
- Genus: Melanoblossia; Purcell, 1903

Type species
- Melanoblossia braunsi Purcell, 1903

Species
- 5, see text

Genus of camel spiders

Melanoblossia is a genus of African melanoblossiid camel spiders, first described by William Frederick Purcell in 1903.

== Species ==
As of April 2023, the World Solifugae Catalog accepts the following five species:

- Melanoblossia ansie Bird & Wharton, 2015 — Namibia
- Melanoblossia braunsi Purcell, 1903 — South Africa
- Melanoblossia globiceps Purcell, 1903 — South Africa
- Melanoblossia namaquensis Lawrence, 1935 — South Africa
- Melanoblossia tridentata Lawrence, 1935 — South Africa
