= Diploglena karooica =

Karoo Two-Eyed Orange Lungless Spider

Conservation status
- Least Concern (SANBI Red List)

Scientific classification
- Kingdom: Animalia
- Phylum: Arthropoda
- Subphylum: Chelicerata
- Class: Arachnida
- Order: Araneae
- Infraorder: Araneomorphae
- Family: Caponiidae
- Genus: Diploglena
- Species: D. karooica

Binomial name
- Diploglena karooica Haddad, 2015

Species of spider

Diploglena karooica is a species of spider of the genus Diploglena. It is found in Namibia and South Africa.

== Distribution ==
Diploglena karooica is known from two provinces in South Africa: the Northern Cape and Western Cape. The species is also found in Namibia.

== Habitat ==
The species is a free-living ground dweller sampled from pitfall traps, with one specimen collected from a scorpion burrow in the Nama Karoo Biome.

== Conservation ==
Diploglena karooica is listed as Least Concern due to its wide geographical range in southern Africa. The species is found at elevations ranging from 834 to 1,048 metres above sea level.

== Description ==
Both males and females are known for this species.
