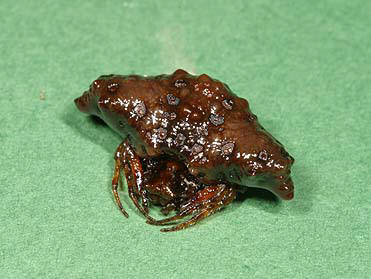
- Female Pasilobus hupingensis
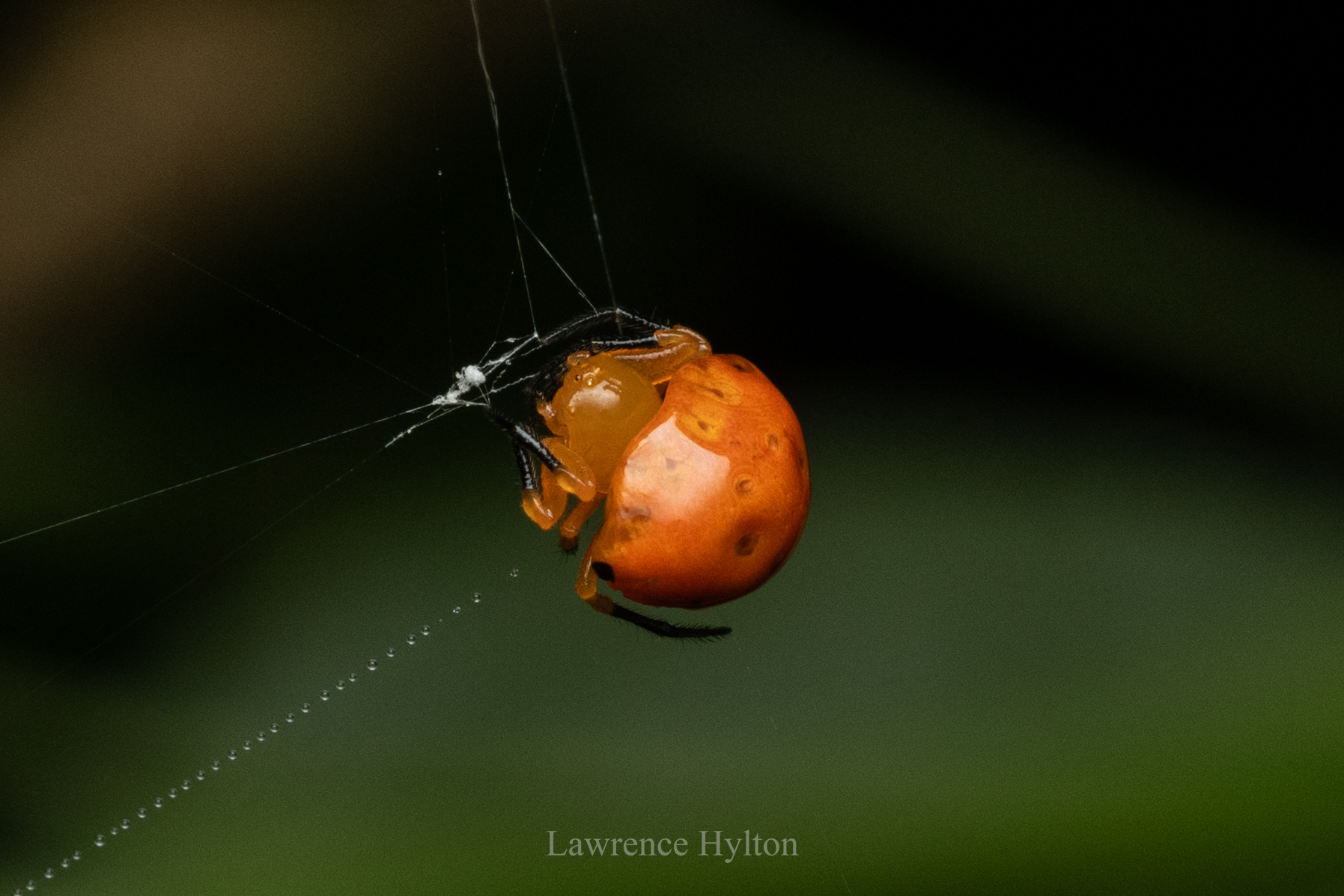
- P. nigrohumeralis from Indonesia

Scientific classification
- Kingdom: Animalia
- Phylum: Arthropoda
- Subphylum: Chelicerata
- Class: Arachnida
- Order: Araneae
- Infraorder: Araneomorphae
- Family: Araneidae
- Subfamily: Cyrtarachninae s.l.
- Genus: Pasilobus; Simon, 1895

Type species
- P. bufoninus (Simon, 1867)

Species
- 14, see text

= Pasilobus =

Genus of spiders

Pasilobus is a genus of orb-weaver spiders first described by Eugène Simon in 1895.

== Description ==
Pasilobus has never been revised other than Simon's (1895) original generic description. Based on the latter, Pasilobus differs from Paraplectana by the presence of thickened lanceolate setae in the eye region. The median ocular quadrangle is subquadrate and slightly raised.

The abdomen is twice as broad as long, with low tubercles. The legs are quite slender, with anterior and posterior legs longest. The patellae, tibiae and metatarsi are flattened and slightly unequal, with metatarsi shorter than tibiae.

== Prey capture ==
Females of the genus Pasilobus construct "triangular spanning-thread webs". The webs have only two sectors, making them appear triangular. Widely spaced threads with sticky drops span the three radii of these webs. One end is attached in such a way that it readily breaks free. When a prey item is caught on one of these threads, the line parts at this end and the prey hangs from the web until it is hauled up by the spider.

Cartoon showing Pasilobus web with prey swinging (dashed line)

The prey caught are almost entirely moths. Normal araneid orb webs are not effective at capturing moths, since their loose scales detach, allowing the moth to escape. Like other genera in the subfamily Cyrtarachninae s.l., Pasilobus species produce special sticky drops that adhere to moths.

Some members of the subfamily (such as bolas spiders and Cyrtarachne) have been shown to produce mimics of the sex pheromones that female moths emit to attract males, and it has been speculated that Pasilobus may do this as well.

== Species ==
As of September 2025, this genus includes fourteen species:

- Pasilobus antongilensis Emerit, 2000 – Madagascar
- Pasilobus bufoninus (Simon, 1867) – Taiwan, Indonesia (Java, Moluccas) (type species)
- Pasilobus capuroni Emerit, 2000 – Madagascar
- Pasilobus conohumeralis (van Hasselt, 1894) – Indonesia (Sumatra, Java)
- Pasilobus dippenaarae Roff & Haddad, 2015 – South Africa
- Pasilobus hupingensis Yin, Bao & Kim, 2001 – China, Japan
- Pasilobus insignis O. Pickard-Cambridge, 1908 – West Africa
- Pasilobus kotigeharus Tikader, 1963 – India
- Pasilobus laevis Lessert, 1930 – DR Congo
- Pasilobus lunatus Simon, 1897 – Indonesia (Java, Sulawesi)
- Pasilobus mammatus Pocock, 1898 – Solomon Islands
- Pasilobus mammosus (Pocock, 1900) – West Africa
- Pasilobus nigrohumeralis (van Hasselt, 1882) – Indonesia (Sumatra)
- Pasilobus sahyadriensis Jwala, Sen & Sureshan, 2022 – India
