= Microblossia =

Scientific classification
- Domain: Eukaryota
- Kingdom: Animalia
- Phylum: Arthropoda
- Subphylum: Chelicerata
- Class: Arachnida
- Order: Solifugae
- Family: Melanoblossiidae
- Genus: Microblossia; Roewer, 1941
- Species: M. eberlanzi

Binomial name
- Microblossia eberlanzi Roewer, 1941

Genus of camel spiders

Microblossia is a monotypic genus of melanoblossiid camel spiders, first described by Carl Friedrich Roewer in 1941. Its single species, Microblossia eberlanzi is distributed in Namibia.
