= Dinorhax =

Scientific classification
- Kingdom: Animalia
- Phylum: Arthropoda
- Subphylum: Chelicerata
- Class: Arachnida
- Order: Solifugae
- Family: Melanoblossiidae
- Genus: Dinorhax; Simon, 1879
- Species: D. rostrumpsittaci

Binomial name
- Dinorhax rostrumpsittaci (Simon, 1877)

Genus of camel spiders

Dinorhax is a monotypic genus of melanoblossiid camel spiders, first described by Eugène Simon in 1879. Its single species, Dinorhax rostrumpsittaci is distributed in Indonesia and Vietnam.
