= Daesiella =

Scientific classification
- Domain: Eukaryota
- Kingdom: Animalia
- Phylum: Arthropoda
- Subphylum: Chelicerata
- Class: Arachnida
- Order: Solifugae
- Family: Melanoblossiidae
- Genus: Daesiella; Hewitt, 1934
- Species: D. pluridens

Binomial name
- Daesiella pluridens Hewitt, 1934

Genus of camel spiders

Daesiella is a monotypic genus of melanoblossiid camel spiders, first described by John Hewitt in 1934. Its single species, Daesiella pluridens is distributed in Namibia.
