= Diploglena arida =

Concordia Two-Eyed Orange Lungless Spider

Conservation status
- Least Concern (SANBI Red List)

Scientific classification
- Kingdom: Animalia
- Phylum: Arthropoda
- Subphylum: Chelicerata
- Class: Arachnida
- Order: Araneae
- Infraorder: Araneomorphae
- Family: Caponiidae
- Genus: Diploglena
- Species: D. arida

Binomial name
- Diploglena arida Haddad, 2015

Species of spider

Diploglena arida is a species of spider of the genus Diploglena. It is found in Namibia and South Africa.

== Distribution ==
Diploglena arida is known from several localities in the arid northern parts of the Northern Cape province of South Africa. The species is protected in Augrabies National Park.

== Habitat ==
The species is a free-living ground dweller sometimes sampled in pitfall traps from the Desert and Succulent Karoo biomes. Two specimens were collected from scorpion burrows, with one individual found in an Opisthacanthus crassimanus burrow.

== Conservation ==
Diploglena arida is listed as Least Concern due to its wide range in southern Africa. The species is found at elevations ranging from 14 to 1,048 metres above sea level.

The species is protected in Augrabies National Park.

== Description ==
Both males and females are known for this species.
