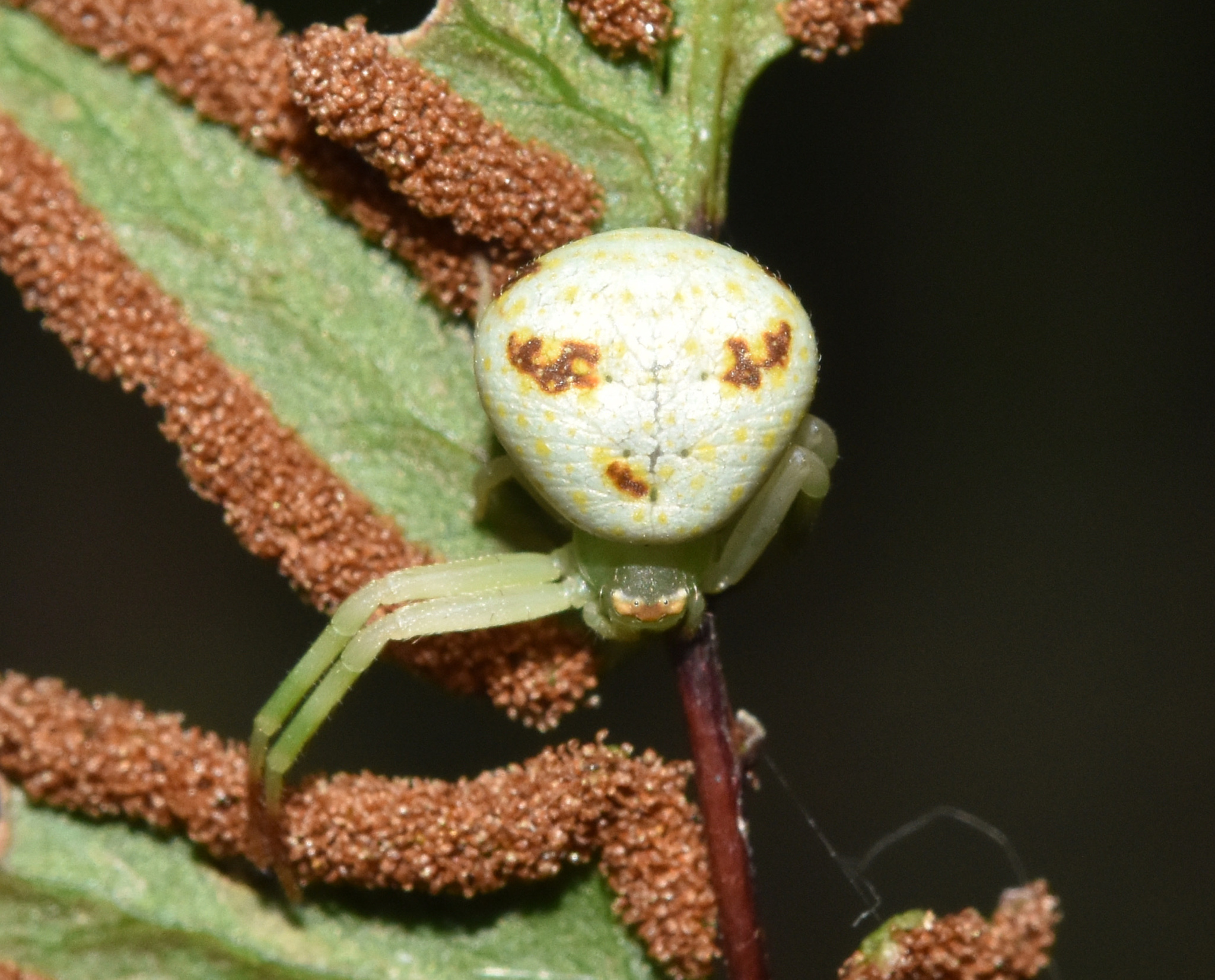
- female
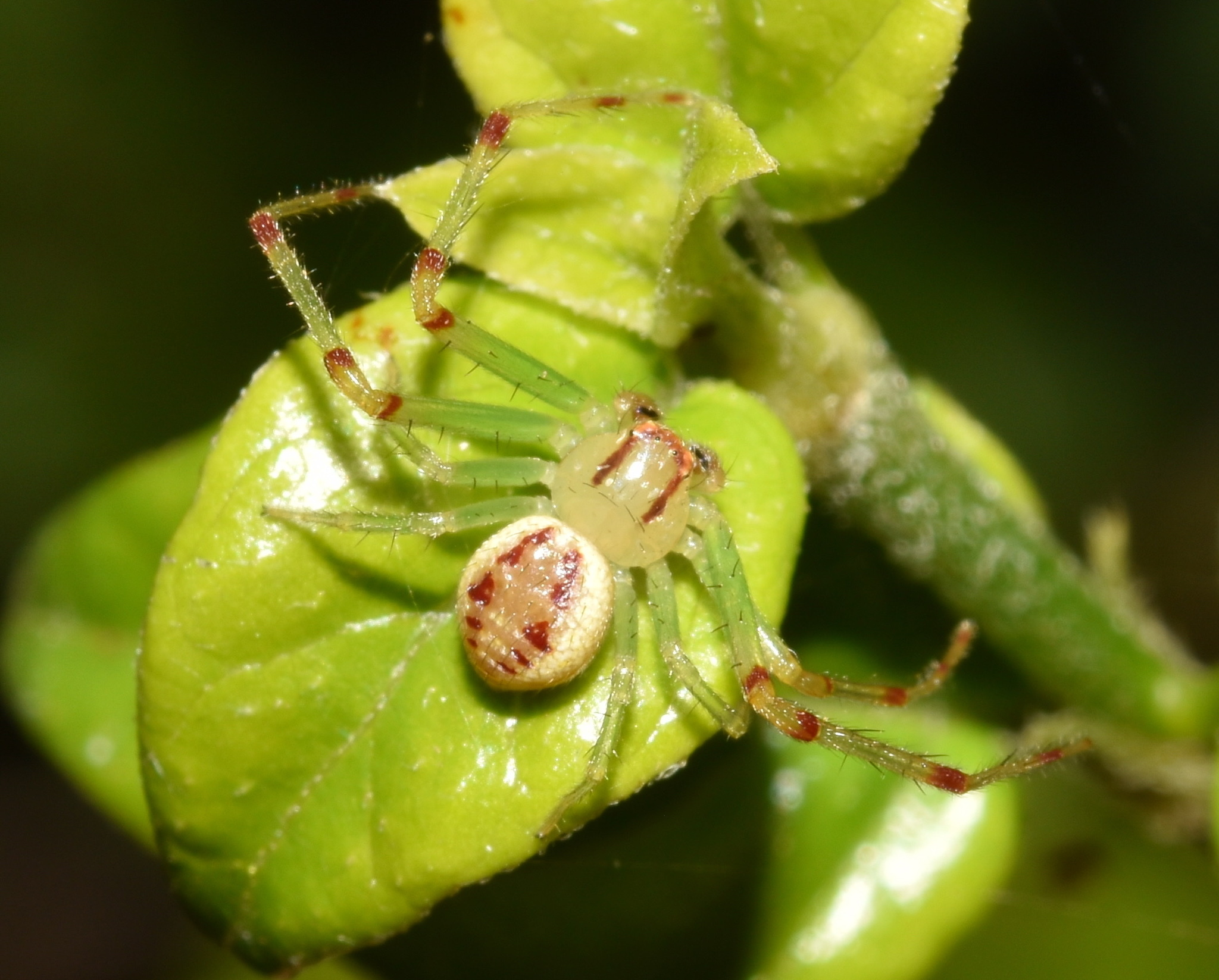
- male

Scientific classification
- Kingdom: Animalia
- Phylum: Arthropoda
- Subphylum: Chelicerata
- Class: Arachnida
- Order: Araneae
- Infraorder: Araneomorphae
- Family: Thomisidae
- Genus: Ansiea
- Species: A. tuckeri

Binomial name
- Ansiea tuckeri (Lessert, 1919)

Synonyms
- Misumena tuckeri Lessert, 1919; Misumenops tuckeri Millot, 1942

= Ansiea tuckeri =

Tucker's crab spider

Species of spider

Ansiea tuckeri is a species of crab spider in the genus Ansiea. It is found across Africa and serves as the type species for its genus. The species is commonly known as Tucker's crab spider.

== Distribution ==
Ansiea tuckeri has a wide distribution across Africa. It has been recorded from the Ivory Coast, São Tomé, Democratic Republic of the Congo, Tanzania, Malawi, Zimbabwe, and South Africa.

In South Africa, the species is found in all provinces and is protected in 11 protected areas. It occurs at elevations ranging from 1 to 1,471 m above sea level.

== Habitat ==
Ansiea tuckeri is a free-living plant dweller that is frequently found on flowers and grasses. The species is common throughout South Africa and has been recorded from various biomes including Grassland, Savanna, Thicket, and the Indian Ocean Coastal Belt. It has also been found in agricultural settings, including avocado, macadamia, and pine plantations.

== Description ==
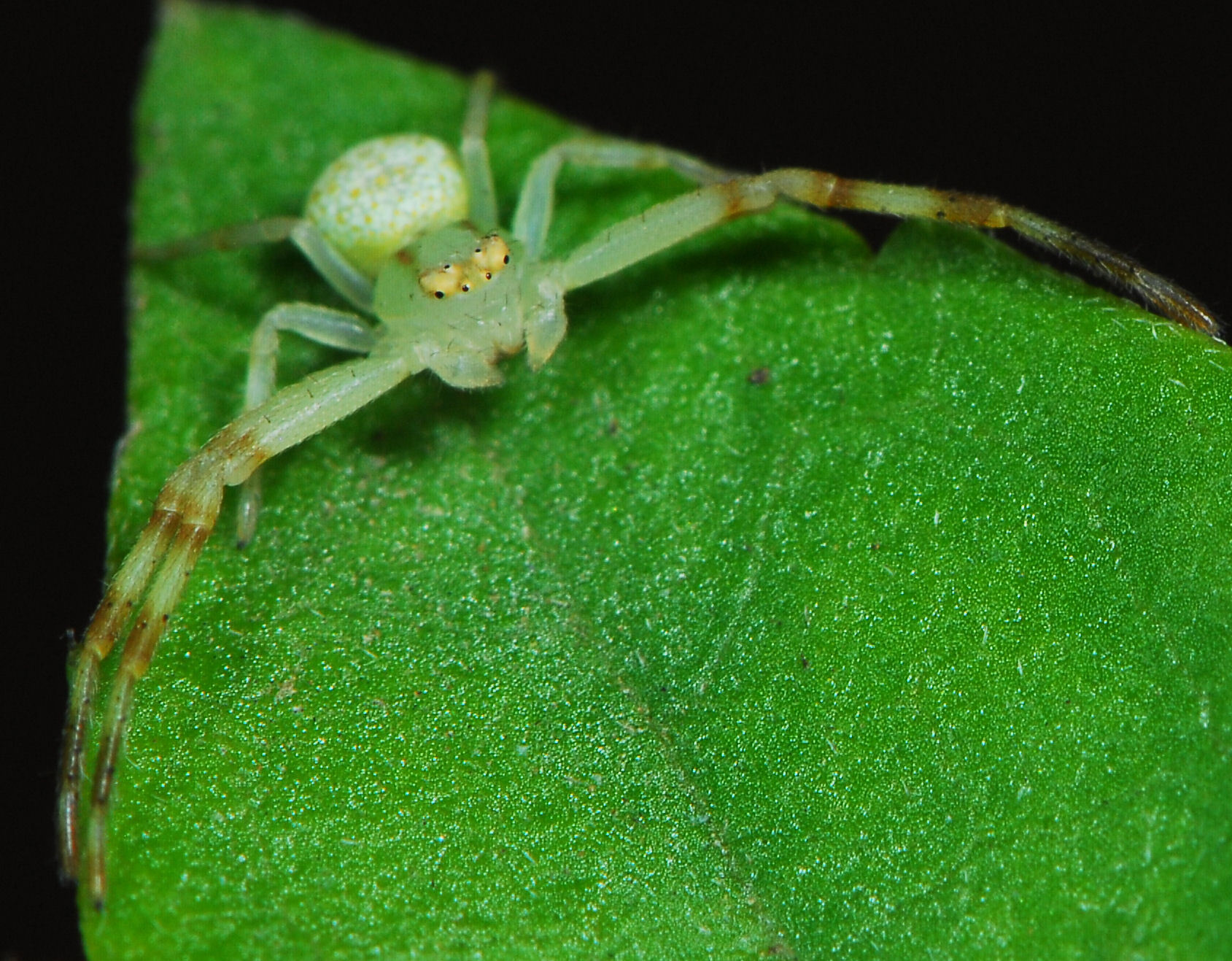
female

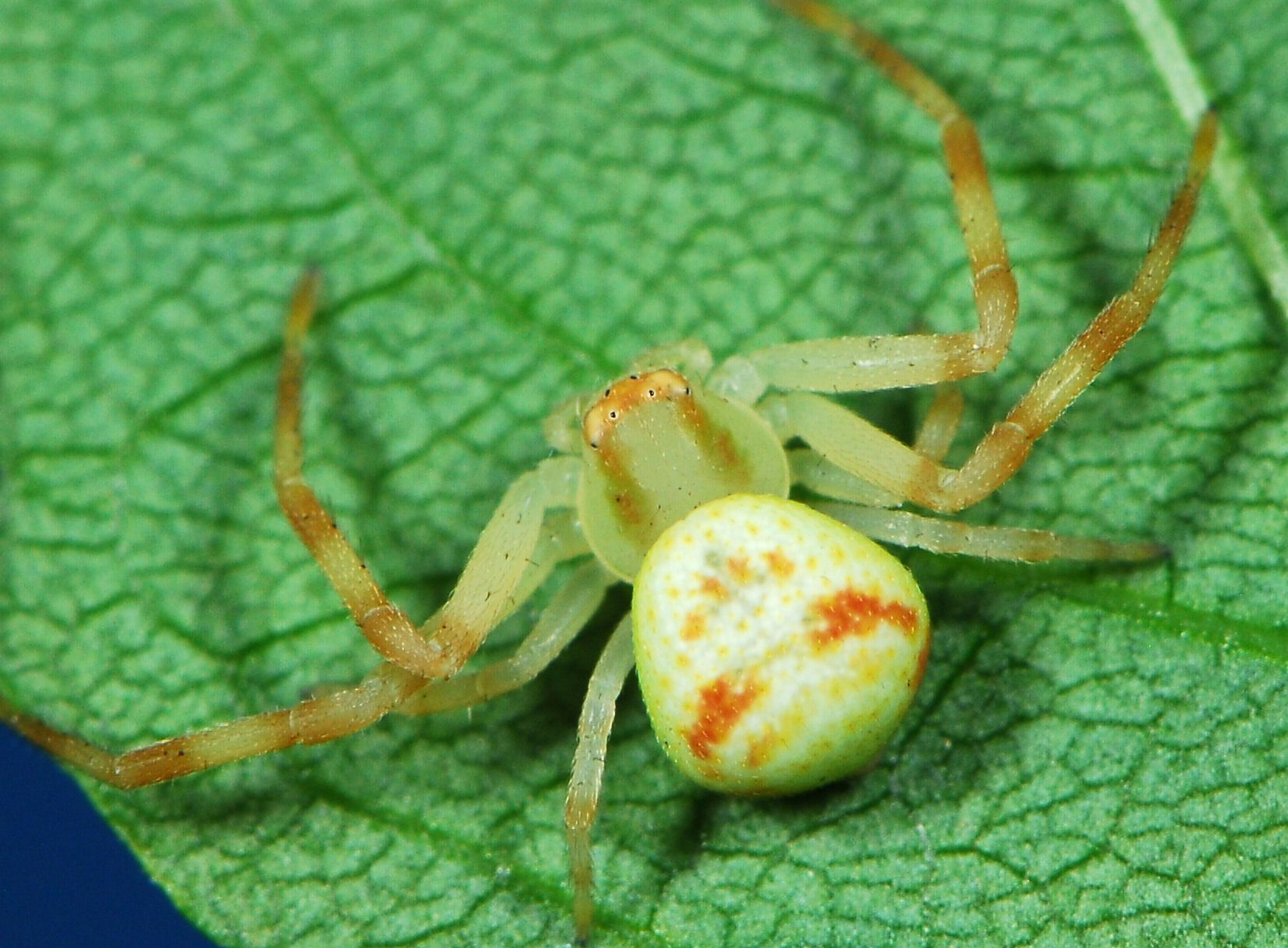
juvenile female

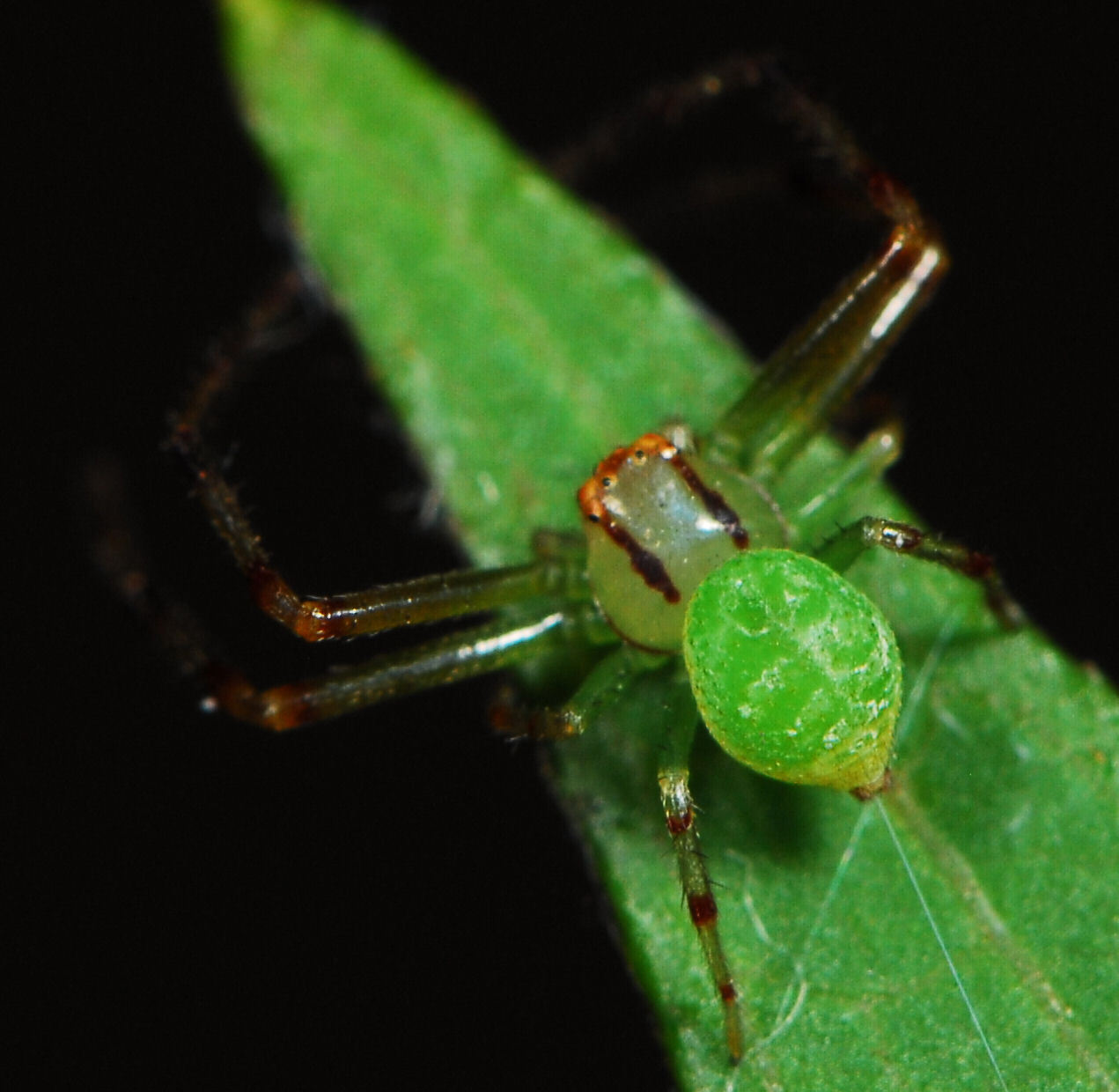
male

== Taxonomy ==
The species was originally described by Roger de Lessert in 1919 as Misumena tuckeri from specimens collected in Tanzania. In 1942, Jacques Millot transferred the species to the genus Misumenops. Ansie Dippenaar-Schoeman returned it to Misumena in 1983 during her revision of southern African thomisid genera. Finally, in 2004, Pekka Lehtinen established the new genus Ansiea and designated this species as the type species, transferring it from Misumena.

== Conservation ==
The species is classified as Least Concern due to its wide geographical range and presence in multiple protected areas.
