= Unguiblossia =

Scientific classification
- Domain: Eukaryota
- Kingdom: Animalia
- Phylum: Arthropoda
- Subphylum: Chelicerata
- Class: Arachnida
- Order: Solifugae
- Family: Melanoblossiidae
- Genus: Unguiblossia; Roewer, 1941

Type species
- Unguiblossia eberlanzi Roewer, 1941

Species
- 2, see text

Genus of camel spiders

Unguiblossia is a genus of melanoblossiid camel spiders, first described by Carl Friedrich Roewer in 1941.

== Species ==
As of April 2023, the World Solifugae Catalog accepts the following two species:

- Unguiblossia cauduliger Lawrence, 1967 — Namibia
- Unguiblossia eberlanzi Roewer, 1941 — Namibia
