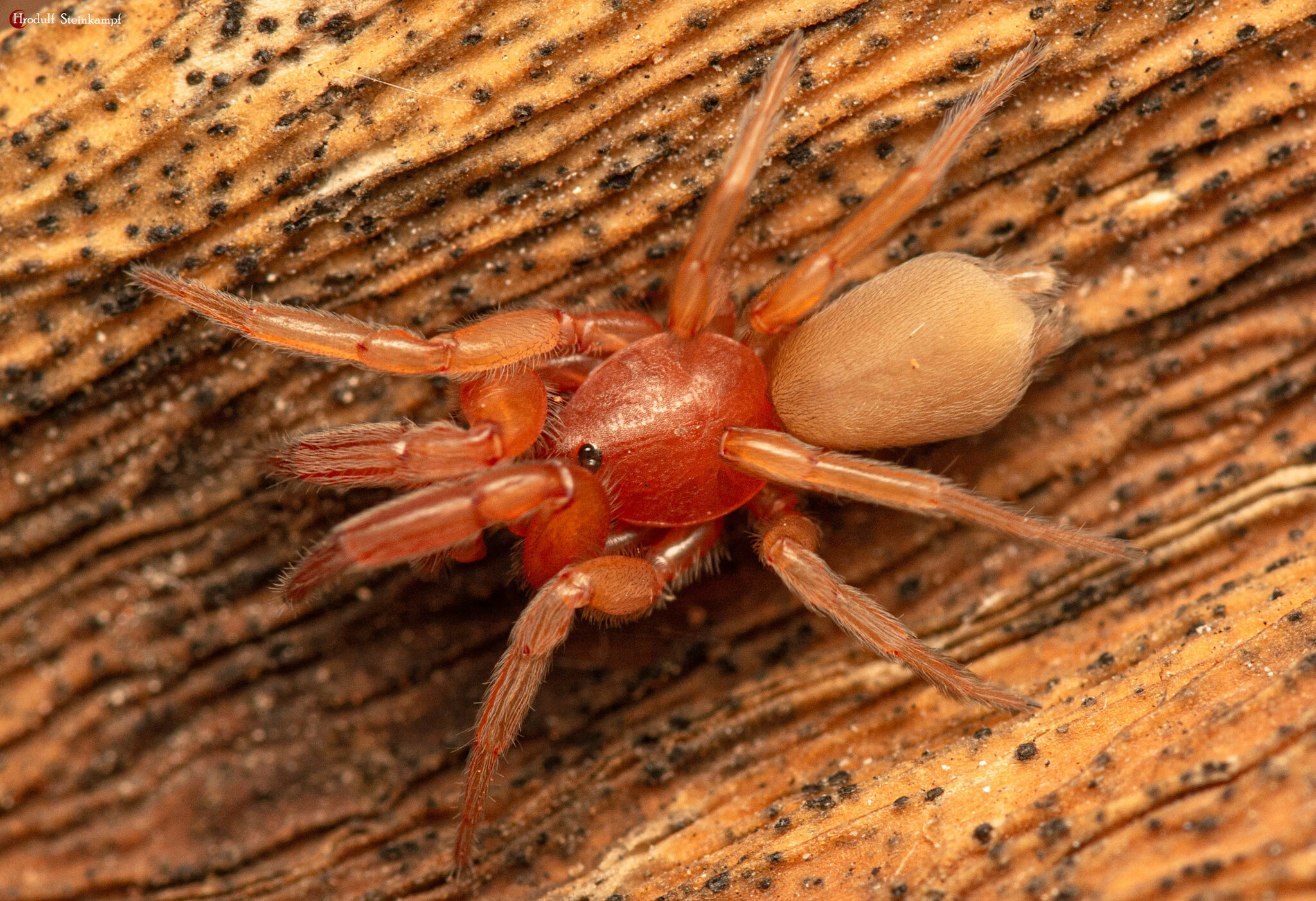
- Diploglena sp.
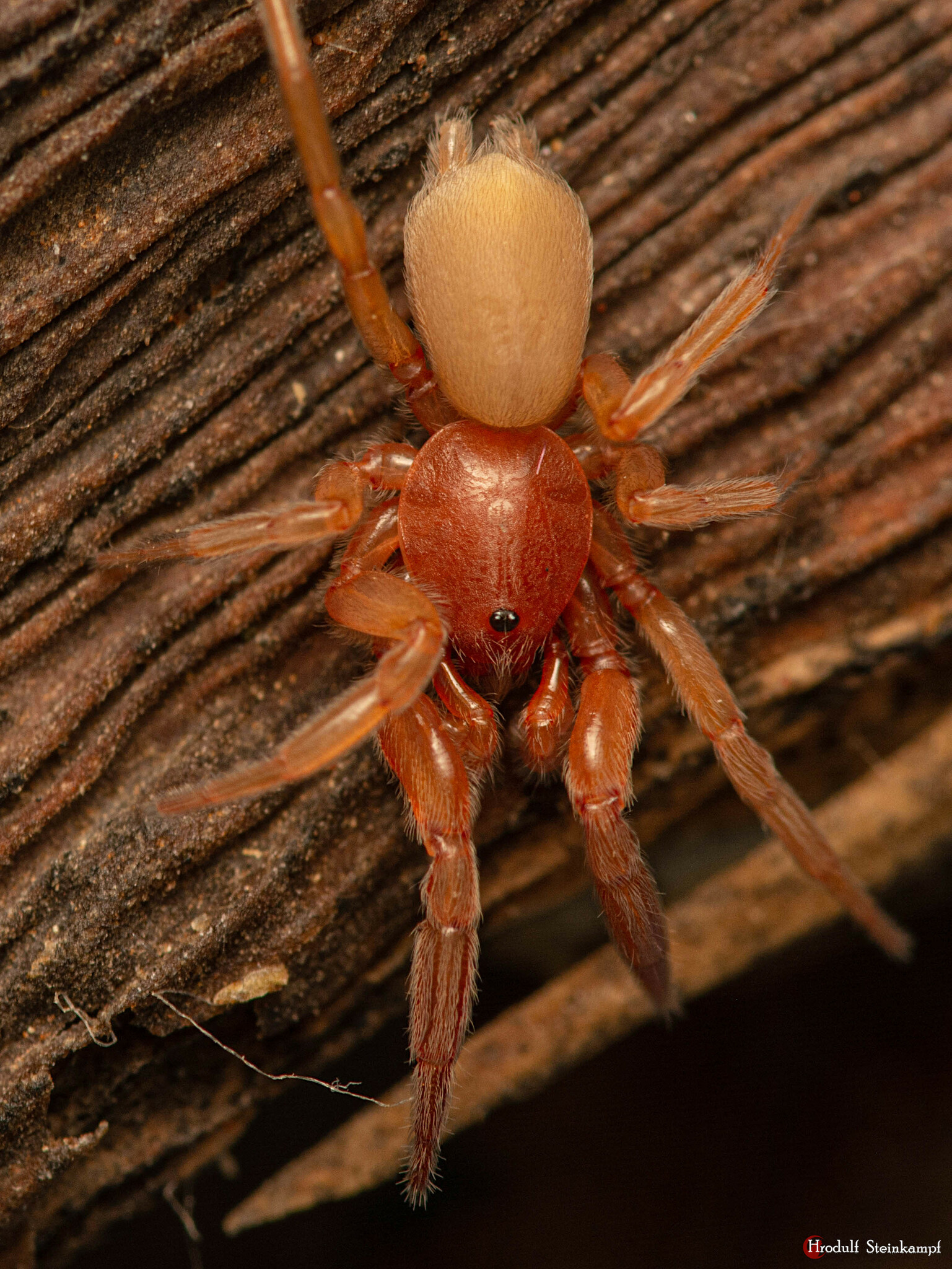
- Diploglena sp.

Scientific classification
- Kingdom: Animalia
- Phylum: Arthropoda
- Subphylum: Chelicerata
- Class: Arachnida
- Order: Araneae
- Infraorder: Araneomorphae
- Family: Caponiidae
- Genus: Diploglena; Purcell, 1904

Type species
- D. capensis Purcell, 1904

Species
- 6, see text

= Diploglena =

Genus of spiders

Diploglena is a genus of African araneomorph spiders in the family Caponiidae, first described by William Frederick Purcell in 1904.

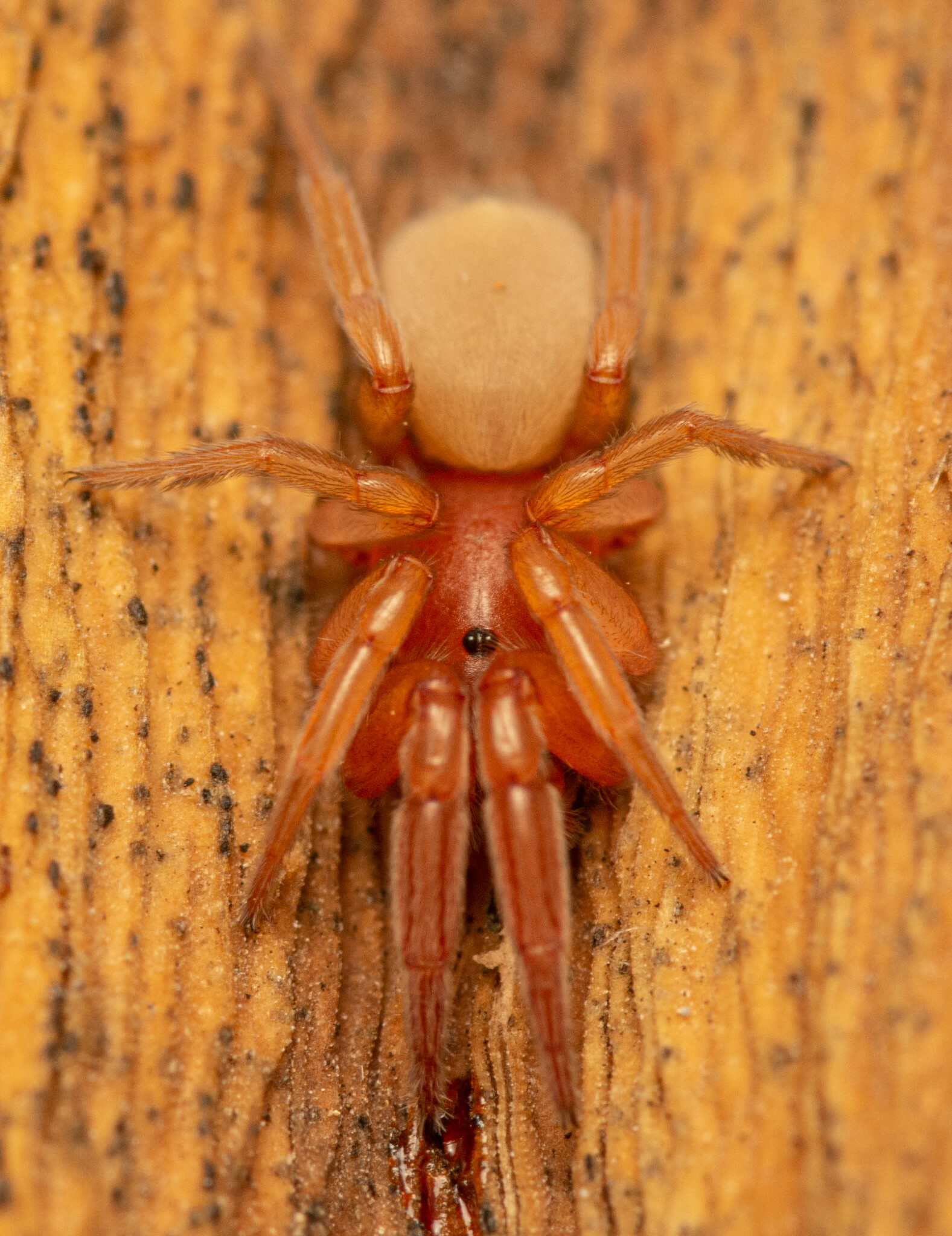
Diploglena sp. from South Africa

== Species ==
As of October 2025, this genus includes six species:

- Diploglena arida Haddad, 2015 – Namibia, South Africa
- Diploglena capensis Purcell, 1904 – South Africa (type species)
- Diploglena dippenaarae Haddad, 2015 – South Africa
- Diploglena karooica Haddad, 2015 – Namibia, South Africa
- Diploglena major Lawrence, 1928 – Namibia, Botswana, South Africa
- Diploglena proxila Haddad, 2015 – South Africa
