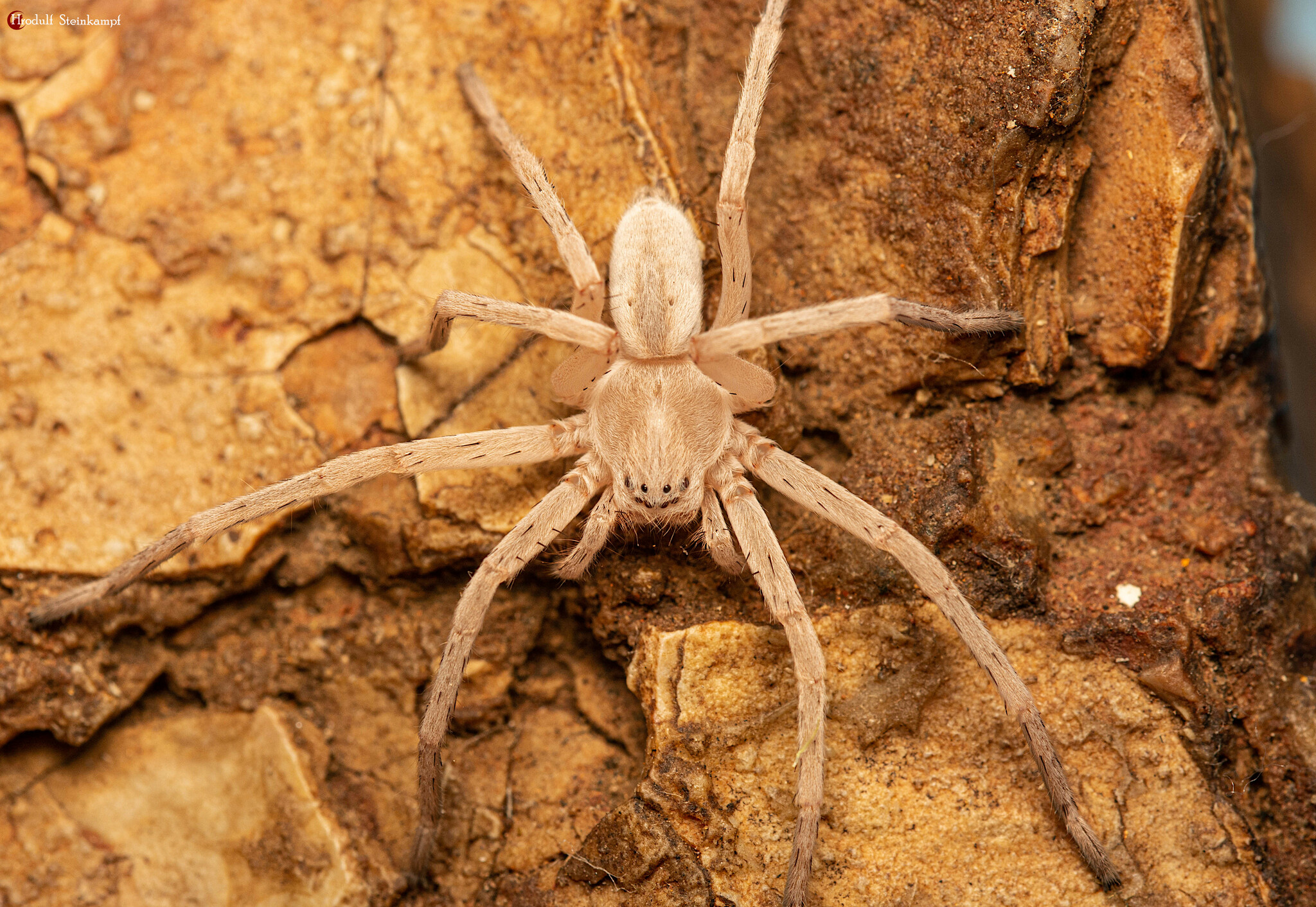
- M. bruno
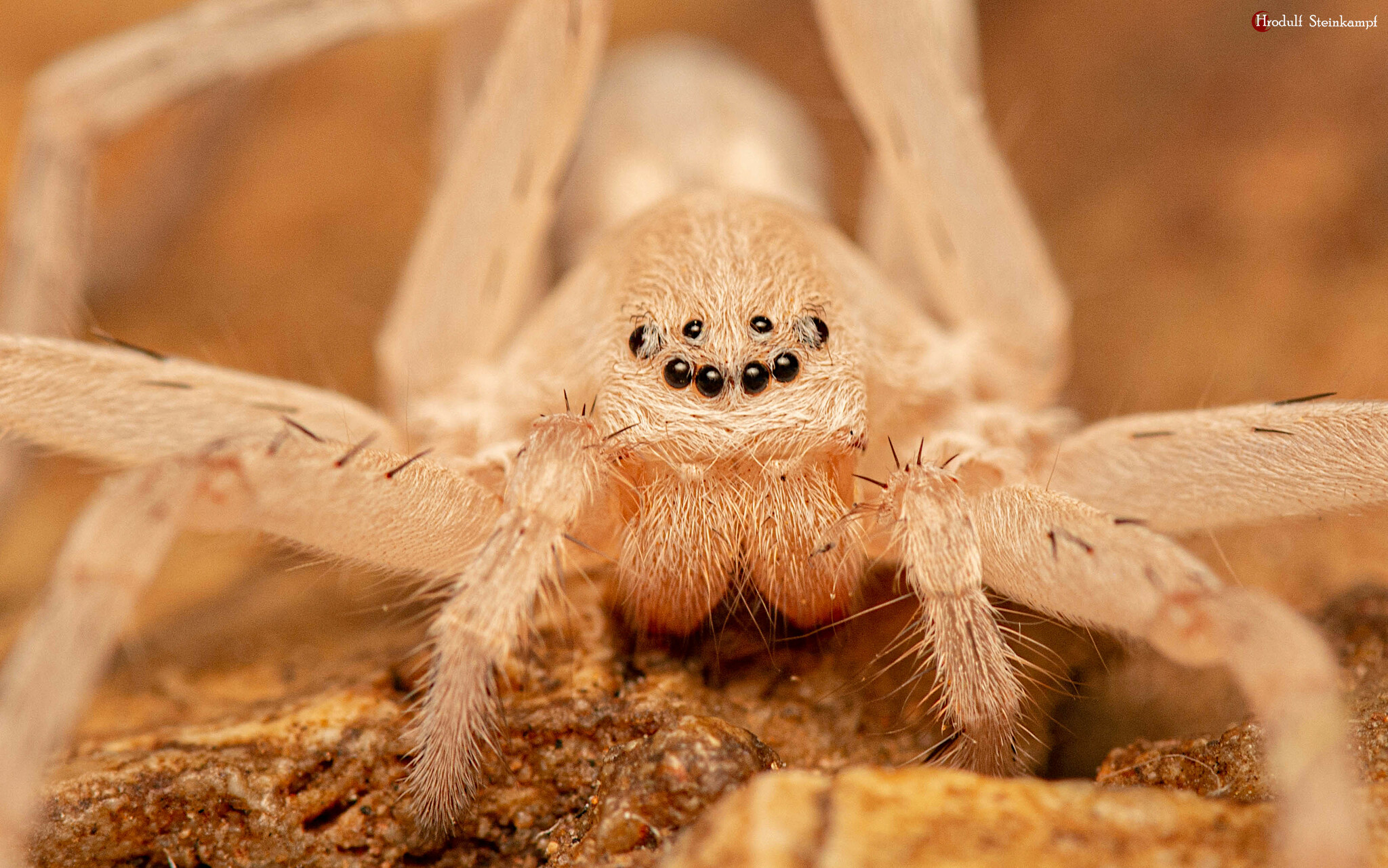
- M. bruno

Scientific classification
- Kingdom: Animalia
- Phylum: Arthropoda
- Subphylum: Chelicerata
- Class: Arachnida
- Order: Araneae
- Infraorder: Araneomorphae
- Family: Sparassidae
- Genus: May; Jäger & Krehenwinkel, 2015

Type species
- May bruno

Species
- 4, see text.

= May (spider) =

Genus of spiders

May is a genus of spiders in the family Sparassidae. It was first described in 2015 by Peter Jäger and Henrik Krehenwinkel.

== Description ==
The genus May Jäger & Krehenwinkel, 2015 comprises small to medium-sized spiders with a body length of 8 to 20 mm. It has conspicuous white setae on its carapace, especially at the clypeus and along the margin, and dark setae in front of and on the spinnerets. In live specimens, setae are white to shimmering pink.

The carapace is as wide as long with a fovea present. the eyes are arranged in two recurved rows. The anterior median eyes are the largest.

The abdomen is oval. The legs have special claw tuft setae. Leg I is shortest, not leg III as in all other Sparassidae. The scopulae on tarsi and metatarsi are moderately dense to sparse.

== Species ==
As of September 2025, this genus includes four species, all endemic to southern Africa:

- May ansie Jäger & Krehenwinkel, 2015 – Namibia
- May bruno Jäger & Krehenwinkel, 2015 – South Africa (type species)
- May norm Jäger & Krehenwinkel, 2015 – Namibia
- May rudy Jäger & Krehenwinkel, 2015 – Namibia
