= Diploglena capensis =

Cape Two-Eyed Orange Lungless Spider

Scientific classification
- Kingdom: Animalia
- Phylum: Arthropoda
- Subphylum: Chelicerata
- Class: Arachnida
- Order: Araneae
- Infraorder: Araneomorphae
- Family: Caponiidae
- Genus: Diploglena
- Species: D. capensis

Binomial name
- Diploglena capensis Purcell, 1904

Species of spider

Diploglena capensis is a species of spider of the genus Diploglena and the type species of the genus. It is endemic to the Western Cape province of South Africa.

== Distribution ==
Diploglena capensis is recorded from only a few localities including St Helena Bay and the Cederberg Wilderness Area.

== Habitat ==
The species is a free-living ground dweller sampled from humus in the Fynbos Biome.

== Conservation ==
Diploglena capensis is listed as Data Deficient. The species is recorded only from a few localities and is partly protected in the Cederberg Wilderness Area. It is found at elevations ranging from 78 to 109 metres above sea level. More sampling is needed to determine the species range.

The species is protected in the Cederberg Wilderness Area.

== Description ==
Both sexes are known for this species.
