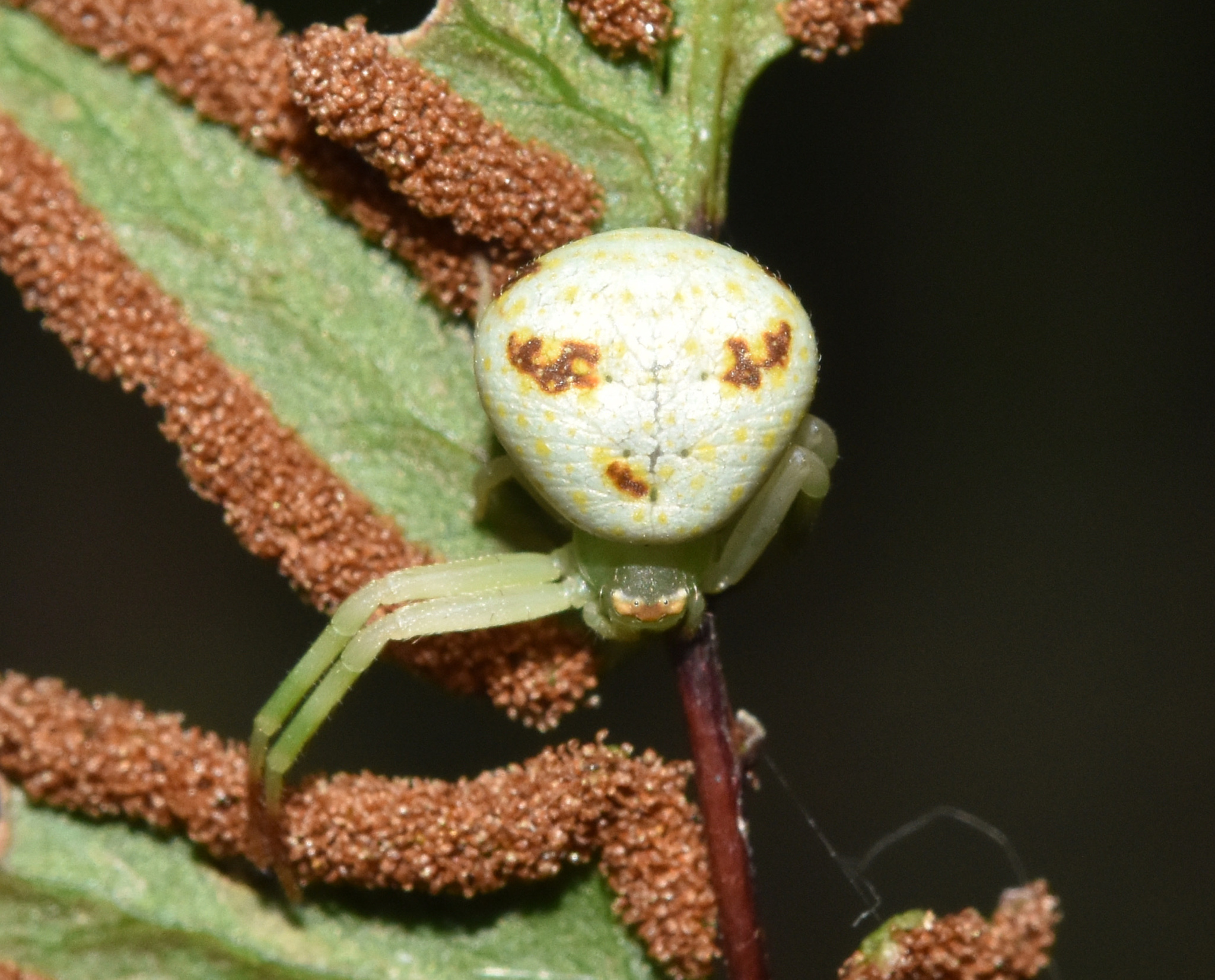
- female A. tuckeri
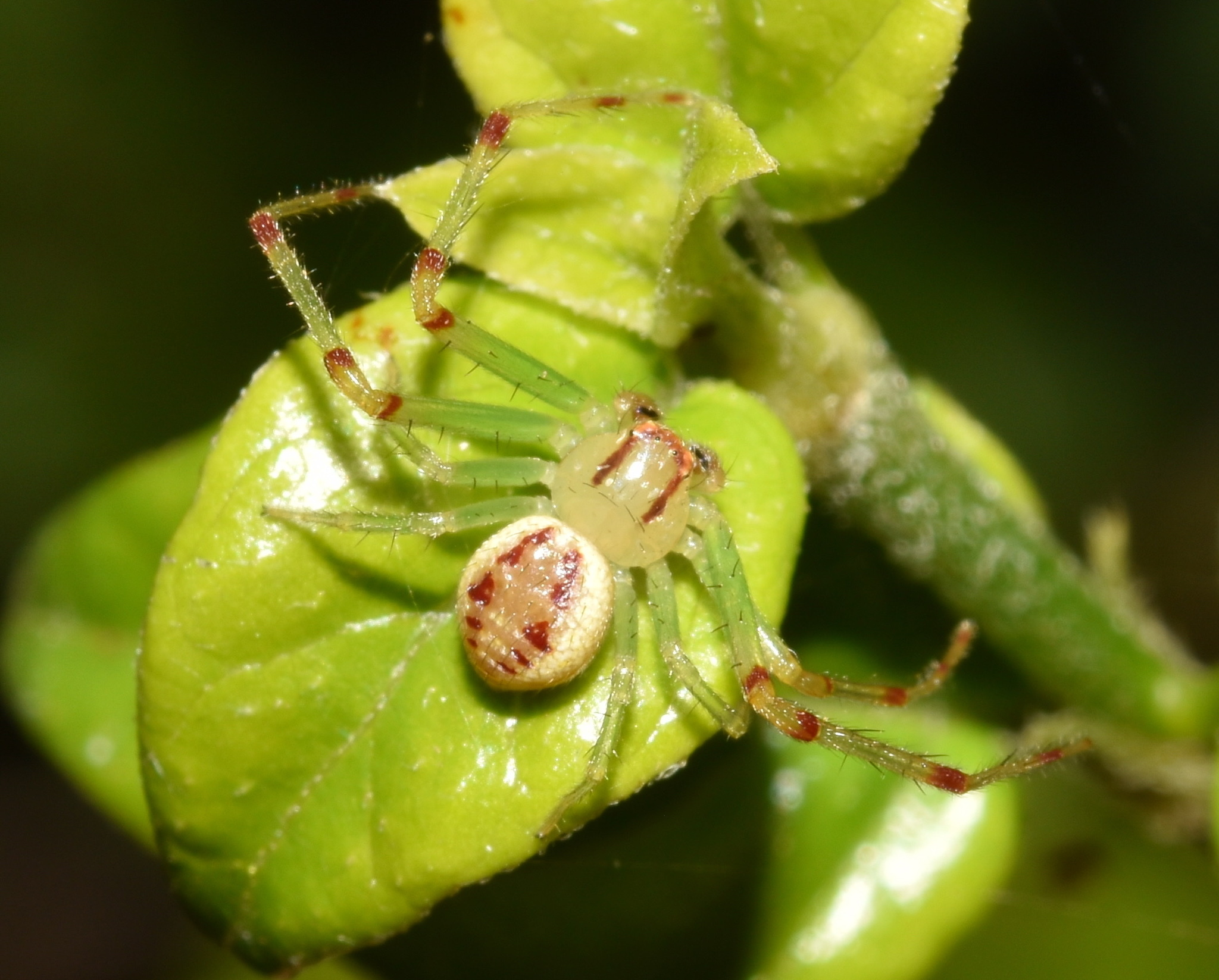
- male A. tuckeri

Scientific classification
- Kingdom: Animalia
- Phylum: Arthropoda
- Subphylum: Chelicerata
- Class: Arachnida
- Order: Araneae
- Infraorder: Araneomorphae
- Family: Thomisidae
- Genus: Ansiea; Lehtinen, 2004

Type species
- Ansiea tuckeri (Lessert, 1919)

Species
- Ansiea buettikeri (Dippenaar-Schoeman, 1989) – Saudi Arabia; Ansiea tuckeri (Lessert, 1919) – Africa; Ansiea tuckeri thomensis (Bacelar, 1958) – São Tomé and Príncipe

= Ansiea =

Genus of spiders

Ansiea is a genus of crab spiders that was first described by Pekka T. Lehtinen in 2004.

The genus is named in honour of South African arachnologist Dr. Anna (Ansie) Dippenaar-Schoeman for her contributions to the study of African Thomisidae.

== Taxonomy ==
The genus Ansiea was established by Lehtinen in 2004 as part of a taxonomic revision of the Misumenini tribe. The type species, Ansiea tuckeri, was originally described as Misumena tuckeri by Lessert in 1919 and was subsequently placed in Misumenops by Millot in 1942 before being transferred to Misumena by Dippenaar-Schoeman in 1983.

Although originally placed in Misumena, the species of this genus are not closely related to it.

== Distribution ==
The genus is distributed across Africa and the Arabian Peninsula. A. tuckeri has been recorded from central, east and south Africa, while A. buettikeri is known only from Saudi Arabia.

== Description ==
Spiders of this genus have pale green to yellowish bodies sometimes with red patterns.

The carapace is as wide as long, low and slightly convex, with the surface clothed with numerous erect spiniform setae. The eyes are in two recurved rows, with lateral eyes on small tubercles. The median ocular quadrangle is wider than long. The abdomen is round oval. The legs are strong, particularly the front legs, with legs I and II having macro setae on tibiae and metatarsi.

Males resemble females and are the same size, but the carapace has two widely spaced brown bands and the legs are banded.

== Species ==
As of September 2025, the genus contains three recognized taxa:

- Ansiea buettikeri (Dippenaar-Schoeman, 1989) – Saudi Arabia
- Ansiea tuckeri (Lessert, 1919) – Ivory Coast, São Tomé, Democratic Republic of the Congo, Tanzania, Malawi, Zimbabwe, South Africa
- Ansiea tuckeri thomensis (Bacelar, 1958) – São Tomé and Príncipe

== See also ==
- List of Thomisidae species
