= Melanoblossiidae =

Scientific classification
- Kingdom: Animalia
- Phylum: Arthropoda
- Subphylum: Chelicerata
- Class: Arachnida
- Order: Solifugae
- Family: Melanoblossiidae; Roewer, 1933

Family of spider-like organisms

Melanoblossiidae is a family of African and Asian solifuges, first described by Carl Friedrich Roewer in 1933.

== Genera ==
As of October 2022, the World Solifugae Catalog accepts the following genera:

1. Daesiella Hewitt, 1934
2. Dinorhax Simon, 1879
3. Lawrencega Roewer, 1933
4. Melanoblossia Purcell, 1903
5. Microblossia Roewer, 1941
6. Unguiblossia Roewer, 1941
