= Pardosa crassipalpis =

Black Palp Pardosa Wolf Spider

Scientific classification
- Kingdom: Animalia
- Phylum: Arthropoda
- Subphylum: Chelicerata
- Class: Arachnida
- Order: Araneae
- Infraorder: Araneomorphae
- Family: Lycosidae
- Genus: Spiniculosa
- Species: S. crassipalpis

Binomial name
- Spiniculosa crassipalpis (Purcell, 1903)

Synonyms
- Pardosa crassipalpis Purcell, 1903; Passiena upembensis Roewer, 1959

Species of spider

Spiniculosa crassipalpis is a species of spider in the family Lycosidae. It is found in southern Africa and is commonly known as the black palp Pardosa wolf spider.

== Distribution ==
Spiniculosa crassipalpis is found in Ethiopia, Democratic Republic of the Congo, Kenya, Tanzania, Namibia, Botswana, Zimbabwe, and South Africa. In South Africa, it is known from all nine provinces at altitudes ranging from 7 to 2102 m.

== Habitat and ecology ==
Spiniculosa crassipalpis inhabits all the floral biomes except the Desert Biome. The species is a fast running ground spider found in a variety of habitat types. It is recognized as an agrobiont species and is commonly found in crops such as apple, cabbage, citrus, cotton, lucerne, maize, pear, pecans, pine, pistachio, potatoes, sorghum, strawberries, sugar cane, sunflower, and tomatoes.

== Conservation ==
Spiniculosa crassipalpis is listed as Least Concern by the South African National Biodiversity Institute. This is a very abundant species with no known threats.

== Taxonomy ==
Spiniculosa crassipalpis was originally described by Purcell in 1903 as Pardosa crassipalpis from Montagu. The species was revised by Roewer in 1959 and is known from both sexes.
