= List of Caponiidae species =

This page lists all described species of the spider family Caponiidae accepted by the World Spider Catalog as of February 2021:

== C ==
=== Calponia ===
Calponia Platnick, 1993

- C. harrisonfordi Platnick, 1993 (type) — USA

=== Caponia ===
Caponia

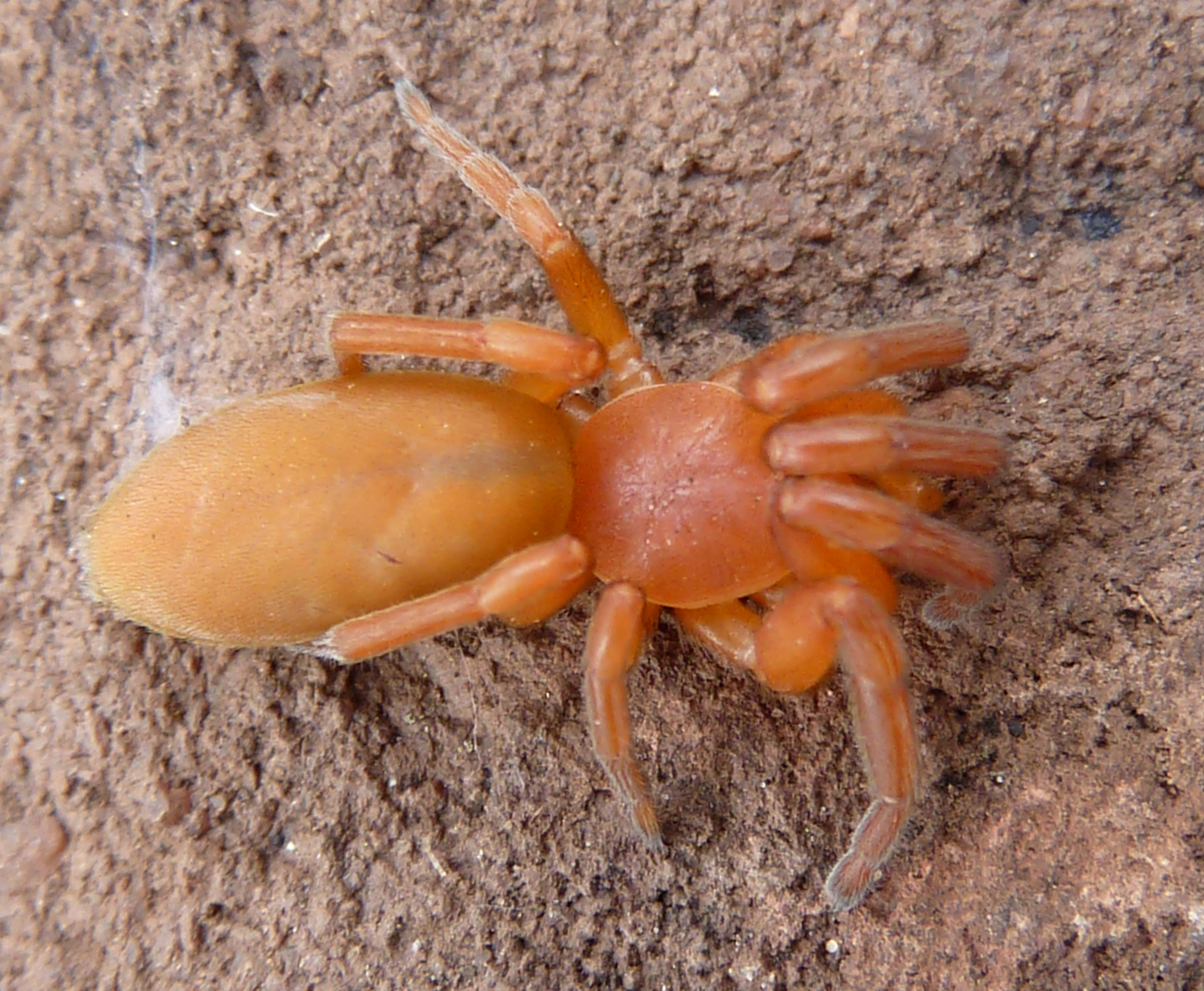
Caponia sp. in South Africa

Caponia Simon, 1887

- C. braunsi Purcell, 1904 — South Africa
- C. capensis Purcell, 1904 — Namibia, Mozambique, South Africa
- C. chelifera Lessert, 1936 — Zimbabwe, Mozambique, South Africa
- C. forficifera Purcell, 1904 — South Africa
- C. hastifera Purcell, 1904 — South Africa, Mozambique
- C. karrooica Purcell, 1904 — South Africa
- C. natalensis (O. Pickard-Cambridge, 1874) (type) — Tanzania, Namibia, Botswana, Mozambique, South Africa
- C. secunda Pocock, 1900 — South Africa
- C. simoni Purcell, 1904 — South Africa
- C. spiralifera Purcell, 1904 — South Africa

=== Caponina ===
Caponina Simon, 1892

- C. alegre Platnick, 1994 — Brazil
- C. cajabamba Platnick, 1994 — Peru
- C. chilensis Platnick, 1994 — Chile
- C. chinacota Platnick, 1994 — Colombia
- C. longipes Simon, 1893 — Venezuela
- C. notabilis (Mello-Leitão, 1939) — Brazil, Uruguay, Argentina
- C. papamanga Brescovit & Sánchez-Ruiz, 2013 — Brazil
- C. paramo Platnick, 1994 — Colombia
- C. pelegrina Bryant, 1940 — Cuba
- C. sargi F. O. Pickard-Cambridge, 1899 — Guatemala, Costa Rica
- C. testacea Simon, 1892 (type) — St. Vincent
- C. tijuca Platnick, 1994 — Brazil

=== Carajas ===
Carajas Brescovit & Sánchez-Ruiz, 2016

- C. paraua Brescovit & Sánchez-Ruiz, 2016 (type) — Brazil

=== Cubanops ===
Cubanops

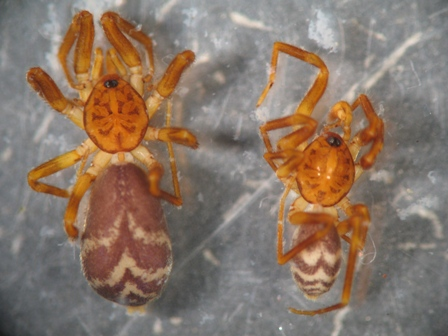
Cubanops alayoni, female & male

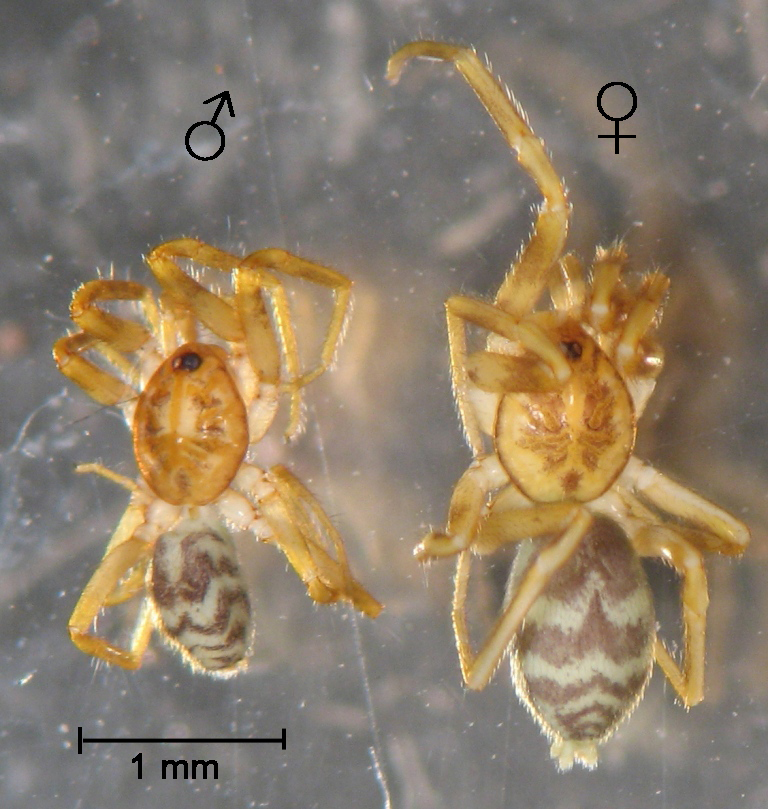
Cubanops terueli, male & female

Cubanops Sánchez-Ruiz, Platnick & Dupérré, 2010

- C. alayoni Sánchez-Ruiz, Platnick & Dupérré, 2010 — Cuba
- C. andersoni Sánchez-Ruiz, Platnick & Dupérré, 2010 — Bahama Is.
- C. armasi Sánchez-Ruiz, Platnick & Dupérré, 2010 — Cuba
- C. bimini Sánchez-Ruiz, Platnick & Dupérré, 2010 — Bahama Is.
- C. darlingtoni (Bryant, 1948) — Hispaniola
- C. granpiedra Sánchez-Ruiz, Platnick & Dupérré, 2010 — Cuba
- C. juragua Sánchez-Ruiz, Platnick & Dupérré, 2010 — Cuba
- C. ludovicorum (Alayón, 1976) (type) — Cuba
- C. luquillo Sánchez-Ruiz, Brescovit & Alayón, 2015 — Puerto Rico
- C. terueli Sánchez-Ruiz, Platnick & Dupérré, 2010 — Cuba
- C. tortuguilla Sánchez-Ruiz, Platnick & Dupérré, 2010 — Cuba
- C. vega Sánchez-Ruiz, Platnick & Dupérré, 2010 — Hispaniola

== D ==
=== Diploglena ===
Diploglena Purcell, 1904

- D. arida Haddad, 2015 — Namibia, South Africa
- D. capensis Purcell, 1904 (type) — South Africa
- D. dippenaarae Haddad, 2015 — South Africa
- D. karooica Haddad, 2015 — Namibia, South Africa
- D. major Lawrence, 1928 — Namibia, Botswana, South Africa
- D. proxila Haddad, 2015 — South Africa

== I ==
=== Iraponia ===
Iraponia Kranz-Baltensperger, Platnick & Dupérré, 2009

- I. scutata Kranz-Baltensperger, Platnick & Dupérré, 2009 (type) — Iran

== L ==
=== Laoponia ===
Laoponia Platnick & Jäger, 2008

- L. pseudosaetosa Liu, Li & Pham, 2010 — Vietnam
- L. saetosa Platnick & Jäger, 2008 (type) — China, Laos, Vietnam

== M ==
=== Medionops ===
Medionops Sánchez-Ruiz & Brescovit, 2017

- M. blades Sánchez-Ruiz & Brescovit, 2017 (type) — Colombia
- M. cesari (Dupérré, 2014) — Ecuador
- M. claudiae Sánchez-Ruiz & Brescovit, 2017 — Brazil
- M. murici Sánchez-Ruiz & Brescovit, 2017 — Brazil
- M. ramirezi Sánchez-Ruiz & Brescovit, 2017 — Brazil
- M. simla (Chickering, 1967) — Panama, Trinidad
- M. tabay Sánchez-Ruiz & Brescovit, 2017 — Venezuela

== N ==
=== Nasutonops ===
Nasutonops Brescovit & Sánchez-Ruiz, 2016

- N. chapeu Brescovit & Sánchez-Ruiz, 2016 — Brazil
- N. sincora Brescovit & Sánchez-Ruiz, 2016 — Brazil
- N. xaxado Brescovit & Sánchez-Ruiz, 2016 (type) — Brazil

=== Nops ===
Nops

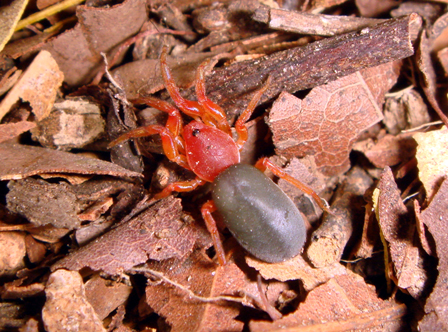
Nops enae

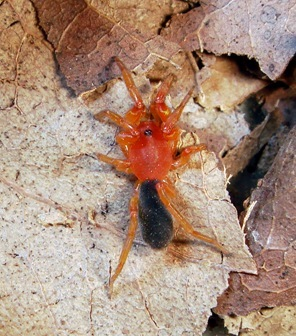
Nops guanabacoae

Nops MacLeay, 1839

- N. agnarssoni Sánchez-Ruiz, Brescovit & Alayón, 2015 — Puerto Rico
- N. alexenriquei Sánchez-Ruiz & Brescovit, 2018 — Brazil
- N. amazonas Sánchez-Ruiz & Brescovit, 2018 — Brazil
- N. anisitsi Strand, 1909 — Paraguay
- N. bahia Sánchez-Ruiz & Brescovit, 2018 — Brazil
- N. bellulus Chamberlin, 1916 — Peru
- N. blandus (Bryant, 1942) — Virgin Is. (US and UK)
- N. branicki (Taczanowski, 1874) — French Guiana
- N. campeche Sánchez-Ruiz & Brescovit, 2018 — Mexico, Belize, Costa Rica
- N. coccineus Simon, 1892 — Saint Vincent and the Grenadines (St. Vincent)
- N. enae Sánchez-Ruiz, 2004 — Cuba
- N. ernestoi Sánchez-Ruiz, 2005 — Hispaniola (Dominican Rep.)
- N. farhati Prosen, 1949 — Argentina
- N. finisfurvus Sánchez-Ruiz, Brescovit & Alayón, 2015 — Virgin Is. (UK), Puerto Rico (Culebra Is.)
- N. flutillus Chickering, 1967 — Curaçao
- N. gertschi Chickering, 1967 — Hispaniola (Dominican Rep.)
- N. glaucus Hasselt, 1887 — Netherlands Antilles (Bonaire)
- N. guanabacoae MacLeay, 1839 (type) — Cuba, Bahamas
- N. hispaniola Sánchez-Ruiz, Brescovit & Alayón, 2015 — Hispaniola (Haiti, Dominican Rep.)
- N. ipojuca Sánchez-Ruiz & Brescovit, 2018 — Brazil
- N. itapetinga Sánchez-Ruiz & Brescovit, 2018 — Brazil
- N. jaragua Sánchez-Ruiz & Brescovit, 2018 — Dominican Rep.
- N. largus Chickering, 1967 — Panama
- N. maculatus Simon, 1893 — Venezuela, Trinidad, Guyana
- N. mathani Simon, 1893 — Brazil
- N. meridionalis Keyserling, 1891 — Brazil
- N. minas Sánchez-Ruiz & Brescovit, 2018 — Brazil
- N. navassa Sánchez-Ruiz & Brescovit, 2018 — Navassa Is. (Haiti or USA)
- N. nitidus Simon, 1907 — Brazil
- N. pallidus Sánchez-Ruiz & Brescovit, 2018 — Cuba
- N. pocone Sánchez-Ruiz & Brescovit, 2018 — Brazil
- N. quito Dupérré, 2014 — Ecuador
- N. siboney Sánchez-Ruiz, 2004 — Cuba
- N. sublaevis Simon, 1893 — Venezuela
- N. tico Sánchez-Ruiz & Brescovit, 2018 — Costa Rica, Panama
- N. toballus Chickering, 1967 — Jamaica
- N. ursumus Chickering, 1967 — Panama
- N. variabilis Keyserling, 1877 — Colombia, Venezuela
- † N. lobatus Wunderlich, 1988

=== Nopsides ===
Nopsides Chamberlin, 1924

- N. ceralbonus Chamberlin, 1924 (type) — Mexico, possibly Peru

=== Nopsma ===
Nopsma Sánchez-Ruiz, Brescovit & Bonaldo, 2020

- N. armandoi Sánchez-Ruiz, Brescovit & Bonaldo, 2020 — Nicaragua
- N. enriquei Sánchez-Ruiz, Brescovit & Bonaldo, 2020 — Peru
- N. florencia Sánchez-Ruiz, Brescovit & Bonaldo, 2020 — Colombia
- N. juchuy (Dupérré, 2014) (type) — Ecuador

=== Notnops ===
Notnops Platnick, 1994

- N. calderoni Platnick, 1994 (type) — Chile

=== Nyetnops ===
Nyetnops Platnick & Lise, 2007

- N. buruti Sánchez-Ruiz, Brescovit & Bonaldo, 2020 — Brazil
- N. guarani Platnick & Lise, 2007 (type) — Brazil
- N. lachonta Sánchez-Ruiz, Brescovit & Bonaldo, 2020 — Bolivia
- N. naylienae Sánchez-Ruiz, Brescovit & Bonaldo, 2020 — Peru

== O ==
=== Orthonops ===
Orthonops Chamberlin, 1924

- Orthonops confuso (Galán-Sánchez & Álvarez-Padilla, 2022) – Mexico
- Orthonops gertschi Chamberlin, 1928 – USA
- Orthonops giulianii Platnick, 1995 – USA
- Orthonops icenoglei Platnick, 1995 – USA, Mexico
- Orthonops iviei Platnick, 1995 – USA
- Orthonops johnsoni Platnick, 1995 – USA
- Orthonops lapanus Gertsch & Mulaik, 1940 – USA
- Orthonops ovalis (Banks, 1898) – Mexico
- Orthonops overtus Chamberlin, 1924 (type) – Mexico
- Orthonops zebra Platnick, 1995 – USA

== T ==
=== Taintnops ===
Taintnops Platnick, 1994

- T. goloboffi Platnick, 1994 (type) — Chile
- T. paposo Brescovit & Sánchez-Ruiz, 2016 — Chile

=== Tarsonops ===
Tarsonops

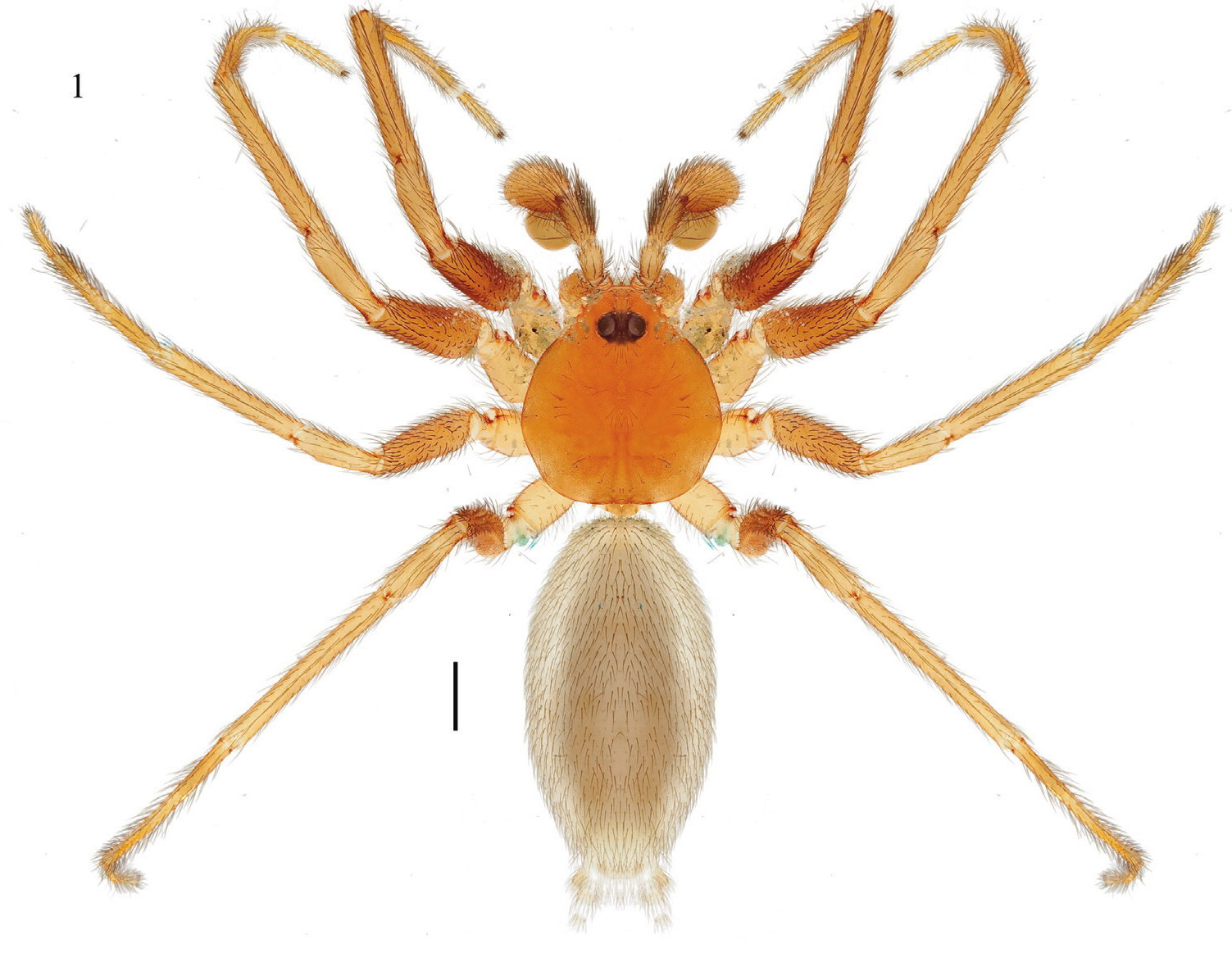
Tarsonops irataylori

Tarsonops Chamberlin, 1924

- T. ariguanabo (Alayón, 1986) — Cuba, Panama
- T. clavis Chamberlin, 1924 — Mexico
- T. coronilla Sánchez-Ruiz & Brescovit, 2015 — Mexico
- T. irataylori Bond & Taylor, 2013 — Belize
- T. sectipes Chamberlin, 1924 (type) — Mexico
- T. sternalis (Banks, 1898) — Mexico
- T. systematicus Chamberlin, 1924 — Mexico

=== Tisentnops ===
Tisentnops Platnick, 1994

- T. leopoldi (Zapfe, 1962) (type) — Chile
- T. mineiro Brescovit & Sánchez-Ruiz, 2016 — Brazil
- T. onix Brescovit & Sánchez-Ruiz, 2016 — Brazil
