= Notnops =

Scientific classification
- Kingdom: Animalia
- Phylum: Arthropoda
- Subphylum: Chelicerata
- Class: Arachnida
- Order: Araneae
- Infraorder: Araneomorphae
- Family: Caponiidae
- Genus: Notnops; Platnick, 1994
- Species: N. calderoni

Binomial name
- Notnops calderoni Platnick, 1994

Genus of spiders

Notnops is a monotypic genus of South American araneomorph spiders in the family Caponiidae, containing the single species, Notnops calderoni. It was first described by Norman I. Platnick in 1994, and has only been found in Chile. They have an orange carapace with yellow legs. Males have a body length of about 2 millimetres (0.079 in) long, and females are slightly larger, with a body length up to 3 millimetres (0.12 in).

== Name ==
Most caponiid spiders are in the subfamily Nopinae, but none of them occur in Chile. Several of these genera have names indicating they aren't among the nopines, including Notnops (literally "not Nops"), Taintnops ("it ain't Nops"), and Tisentnops ("it isn't Nops"). The species name is in honor of Chilean arachnologist Raúl Calderón.
