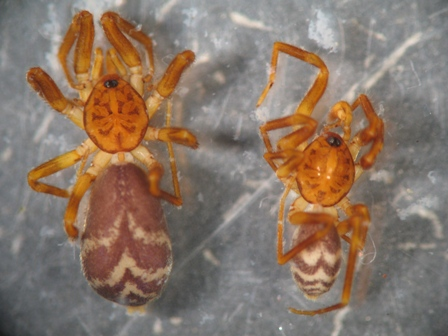
- Cubanops alayoni female (left) and male (right), Cuba

Scientific classification
- Kingdom: Animalia
- Phylum: Arthropoda
- Subphylum: Chelicerata
- Class: Arachnida
- Order: Araneae
- Infraorder: Araneomorphae
- Family: Caponiidae
- Genus: Cubanops; Sánchez-Ruiz, Platnick & Dupérré, 2010

Type species
- C. ludovicorum (Alayón, 1976)

Species
- 12, see text

= Cubanops =

Genus of spiders

Cubanops is a genus of Caribbean araneomorph spiders in the family Caponiidae first described by A. Sánchez-Ruiz, Norman I. Platnick & N. Dupérré in 2010. These spiders are wandering hunters, generally found at ground level, under stones, in leaf litter or in the soil, and have only been found in the West Indies.

== Description ==
They are a distinctive group of relatively small spiders, growing from 4 to 10 millimetres (0.16 to 0.39 in) in body length, and are very difficult to find in nature. Although specimens have only been recorded from the Bahamas, Cuba, and Hispaniola, a few female juvenile specimens sharing the somatic characters of the genus have been taken from Saint John Parish, Antigua and Barbuda, suggesting that Cubanops probably also occurs in Puerto Rico as well as the Virgin Islands.

These spiders have tarsi that are subsegmented as well as a ventral translucent keel on their anterior metatarsi. They also have a translucent membrane connecting the anterior metatarsi and tarsi similar to those found in Nops, Orthonops, and Tarsonops. Species of Cubanops can be distinguished from species of Nops by the lack of a dorsally extended inferior claw found in Nops species. They can be distinguished from members of Orthonops and Tarsonops by the distinct chevron patterns on their carapace, their widened labium, and a bisegmented fourth metatarsi.

== Species ==
As of April 2019 it contains twelve species:

- Cubanops alayoni Sánchez-Ruiz, Platnick & Dupérré, 2010 – Cuba
- Cubanops andersoni Sánchez-Ruiz, Platnick & Dupérré, 2010 – Bahama Is.
- Cubanops armasi Sánchez-Ruiz, Platnick & Dupérré, 2010 – Cuba
- Cubanops bimini Sánchez-Ruiz, Platnick & Dupérré, 2010 – Bahama Is.
- Cubanops darlingtoni (Bryant, 1948) – Hispaniola
- Cubanops granpiedra Sánchez-Ruiz, Platnick & Dupérré, 2010 – Cuba
- Cubanops juragua Sánchez-Ruiz, Platnick & Dupérré, 2010 – Cuba
- Cubanops ludovicorum (Alayón, 1976) (type) – Cuba
- Cubanops luquillo Sánchez-Ruiz, Brescovit & Alayón, 2015 – Puerto Rico
- Cubanops terueli Sánchez-Ruiz, Platnick & Dupérré, 2010 – Cuba
- Cubanops tortuguilla Sánchez-Ruiz, Platnick & Dupérré, 2010 – Cuba
- Cubanops vega Sánchez-Ruiz, Platnick & Dupérré, 2010 – Hispaniola

== Gallery ==
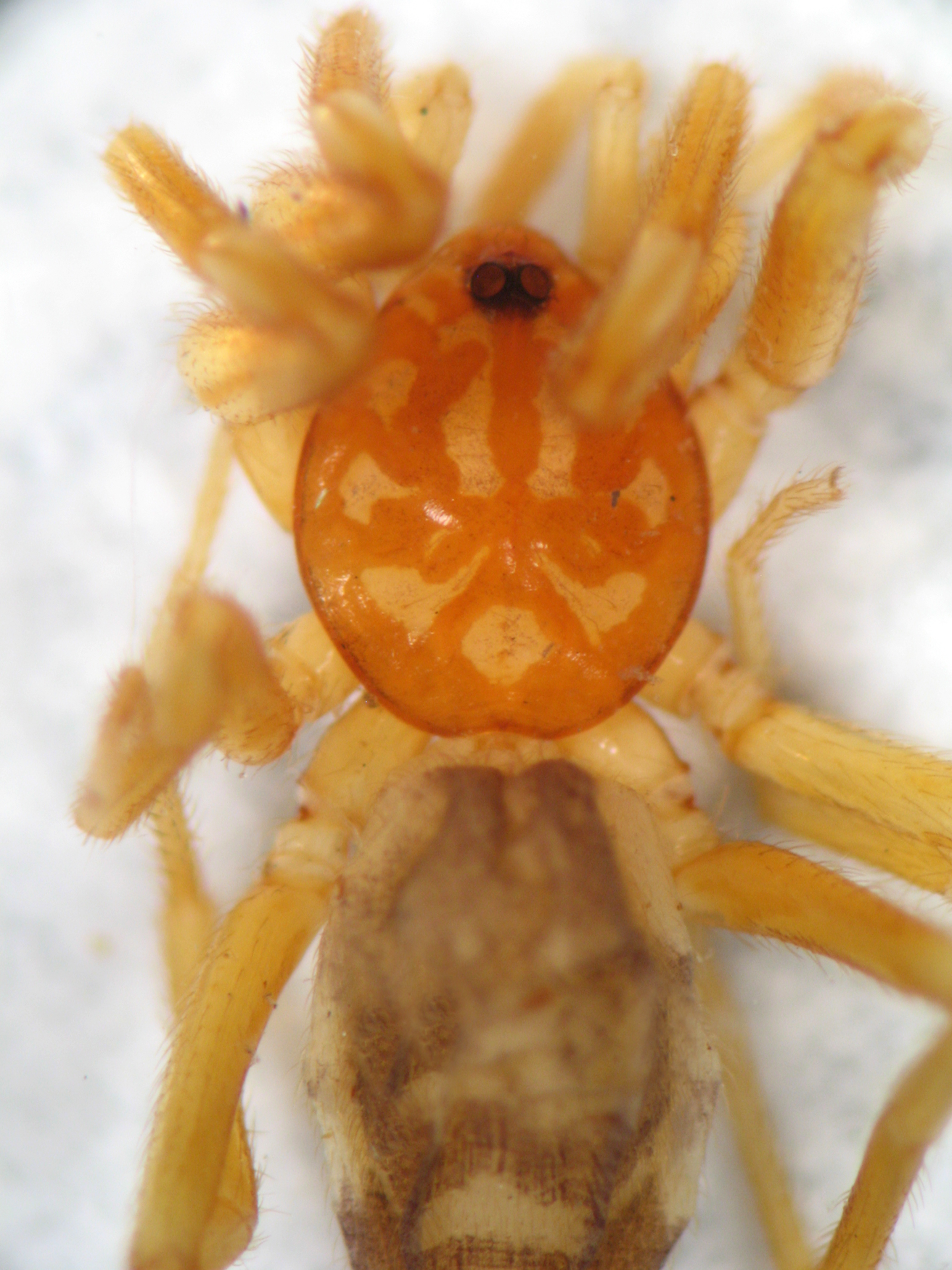
Cubanops ludovicorum Alayon, female

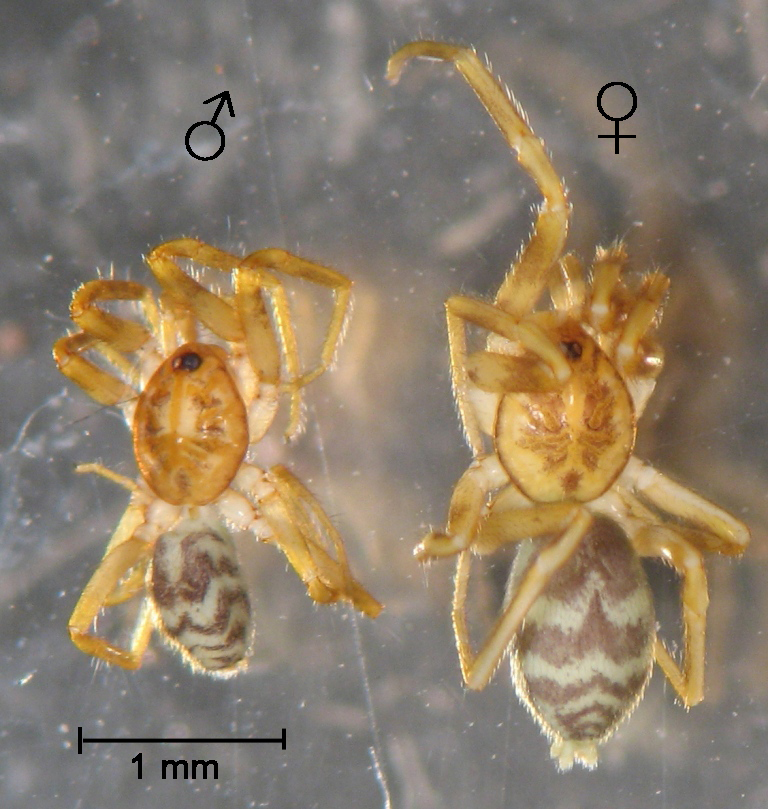
Cubanops terueli Sánchez-Ruiz et al., male and female

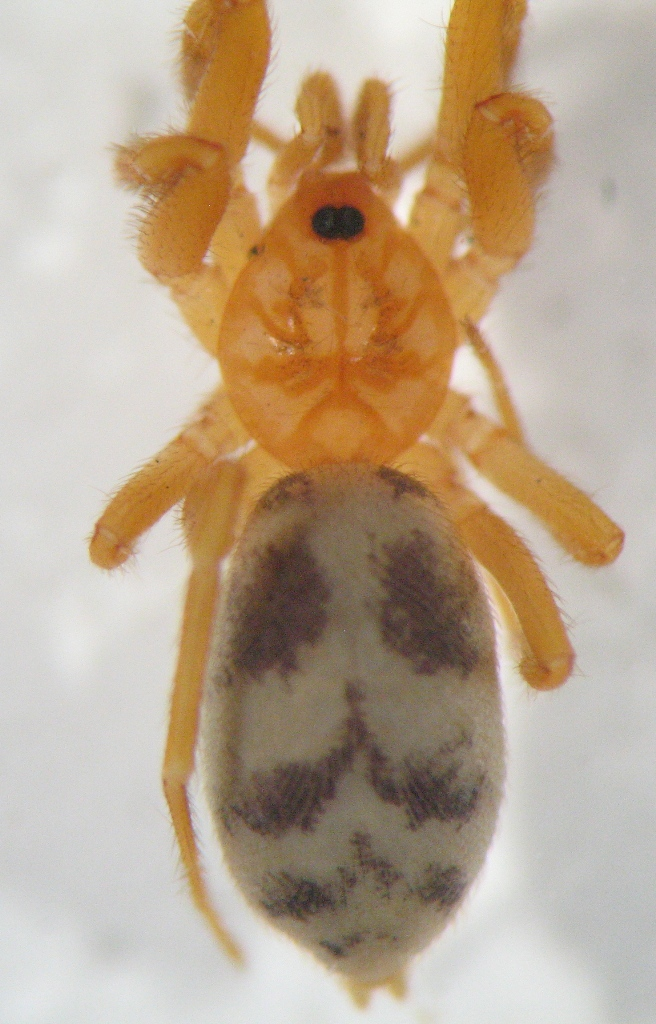
Cubanops tortuguilla Sánchez-Ruiz et al., female

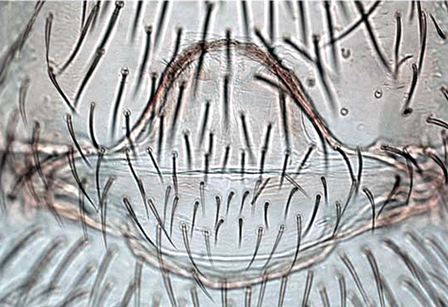
Cubanops granpiedra Sánchez-Ruiz et al., internal genitalia

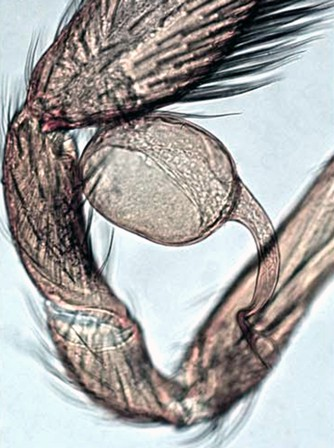
Cubanops granpiedra Sánchez-Ruiz et al., male palp

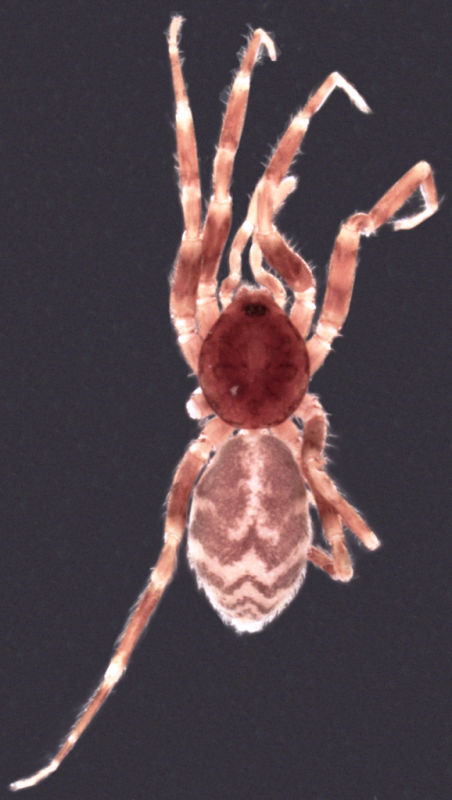
Cubanops darlingtoni Bryant, female

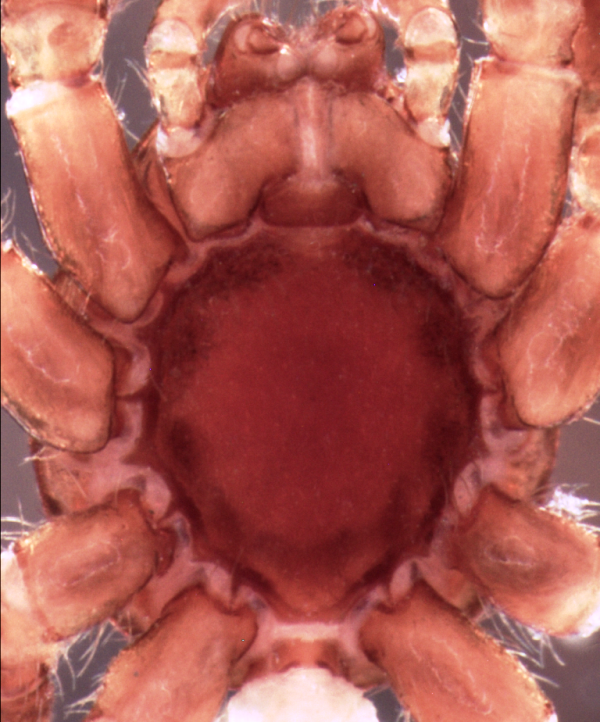
Cubanops darlingtoni Bryant, sternum
