= Nopsides =

Scientific classification
- Kingdom: Animalia
- Phylum: Arthropoda
- Subphylum: Chelicerata
- Class: Arachnida
- Order: Araneae
- Infraorder: Araneomorphae
- Family: Caponiidae
- Genus: Nopsides; Chamberlin, 1924
- Species: N. ceralbonus

Binomial name
- Nopsides ceralbonus Chamberlin, 1924

Genus of spiders

Nopsides is a monotypic genus of North American araneomorph spiders in the family Caponiidae, containing the single species, Nopsides ceralbonus. It is one of three nopine species, in addition to Tarsonops and Orthonops, described by Ralph Vary Chamberlin from specimens collected from the Baja California region and nearby islands in 1924. They are active during the night, hiding under large stones of Mexico's deserts and xeric shrublands during the day.

This species has only been found in north and central Mexico, and might also occur in Peru, though the single specimen found is a juvenile and difficult to identify with absolute certainty.

== Description ==
These spiders have subsegmented tarsi similar to the other nopine genera, Nops, Tarsonops, and Orthonops. They can easily be distinguished from other nopines by their unique eye pattern: two distinctly separate rows of four eyes each. They can sometimes be further distinguished by the claws on leg tarsi. In most spiders with three claws, the unpaired claw is smaller than the other two. However, Nopsides will sometimes have an elongated third claw that sometimes extends even farther dorsally than the other two. Certain species of Nops also have this feature, though they haven't been studied enough to determine its prevalence.
