= Yvonne Kranz-Baltensperger =

Swiss arachnologist and entomologist

Yvonne Kranz-Baltensperger, born in 1973 in Innsbruck, is a Swiss arachnologist and entomologist.

== Biography ==
Yvonne Kranz-Baltensperger attended the University of Bern, where she studied biology, completing her Ph.D. thesis entitled Systematics of the Oonopid spider genera Xyphinus, Ischnothyreus and Trilacuna (Araneae, Oonopidae) in 2014. Since 1997, she has held a scientific assistant position at the Natural History Museum of Bern, where she works on the Planetary Biodiversity Inventory (PBI) with six-eyed spiders (Oonopidae). She specializes in the study of arachnofauna, including pseudoscorpions and arachnids from the Indomalayan region. Her zoological abbreviation is Kranz-Baltensperger.

== Eponym ==
Prethopalpus kranzae, a species of goblin spider (Oonopidae) endemic to Sumatra, Baehr, 2012

== Selected taxa described ==
- Brignolia ankhu Platnick, Dupérré, Ott & Kranz-Baltensperger, 2011
- Brignolia assam Platnick, Dupérré, Ott & Kranz-Baltensperger, 2011
- Brignolia bengal Platnick, Dupérré, Ott & Kranz-Baltensperger, 2011
- Brignolia cardamom Platnick, Dupérré, Ott & Kranz-Baltensperger, 2011
- Brignolia chumphae Platnick, Dupérré, Ott & Kranz-Baltensperger, 2011
- Brignolia cobre Platnick, Dupérré, Ott & Kranz-Baltensperger, 2011
- Brignolia dasysterna Platnick, Dupérré, Ott & Kranz-Baltensperger, 2011
- Brignolia diablo Platnick, Dupérré, Ott & Kranz-Baltensperger, 2011
- Brignolia elongata Platnick, Dupérré, Ott & Kranz-Baltensperger, 2011
- Brignolia gading Platnick, Dupérré, Ott & Kranz-Baltensperger, 2011
- Brignolia jog Platnick, Dupérré, Ott & Kranz-Baltensperger, 2011
- Brignolia kaikatty Platnick, Dupérré, Ott & Kranz-Baltensperger, 2011
- Brignolia kapit Platnick, Dupérré, Ott & Kranz-Baltensperger, 2011
- Brignolia karnataka Platnick, Dupérré, Ott & Kranz-Baltensperger, 2011
- Brignolia kodaik Platnick, Dupérré, Ott & Kranz-Baltensperger, 2011
- Brignolia kumily Platnick, Dupérré, Ott & Kranz-Baltensperger, 2011
- Brignolia mapha Platnick, Dupérré, Ott & Kranz-Baltensperger, 2011
- Brignolia nilgiri Platnick, Dupérré, Ott & Kranz-Baltensperger, 2011
- Brignolia palawan Platnick, Dupérré, Ott & Kranz-Baltensperger, 2011
- Brignolia ratnapura Platnick, Dupérré, Ott & Kranz-Baltensperger, 2011
- Brignolia rothorum Platnick, Dupérré, Ott & Kranz-Baltensperger, 2011
- Brignolia schwendingeri Platnick, Dupérré, Ott & Kranz-Baltensperger, 2011
- Brignolia sinharaja Platnick, Dupérré, Ott & Kranz-Baltensperger, 2011
- Brignolia sukna Platnick, Dupérré, Ott & Kranz-Baltensperger, 2011
- Brignolia suthep Platnick, Dupérré, Ott & Kranz-Baltensperger, 2011
- Brignolia valparai Platnick, Dupérré, Ott & Kranz-Baltensperger, 2011
- Iraponia Kranz-Baltensperger, Platnick & Dupérré, 2009
- Iraponia scutata Kranz-Baltensperger, Platnick & Dupérré, 2009
- Ischnothyreus balu Kranz-Baltensperger, 2011
- Ischnothyreus barus Kranz-Baltensperger, 2011
- Ischnothyreus danum Kranz-Baltensperger, 2011
- Ischnothyreus deelemanae Kranz-Baltensperger, 2011
- Ischnothyreus elvis Kranz-Baltensperger, 2011
- Ischnothyreus falcifer Kranz-Baltensperger, 2011
- Ischnothyreus flabellifer Kranz-Baltensperger, 2011
- Ischnothyreus flippi Kranz-Baltensperger, 2011
- Ischnothyreus florifer Kranz-Baltensperger, 2011
- Ischnothyreus fobor Kranz-Baltensperger, 2011
- Ischnothyreus hooki Kranz-Baltensperger, 2011
- Ischnothyreus jojo Kranz-Baltensperger, 2011
- Ischnothyreus kalimantan Kranz-Baltensperger, 2011
- Ischnothyreus matang Kranz-Baltensperger, 2011
- Ischnothyreus mulumi Kranz-Baltensperger, 2011
- Ischnothyreus namo Kranz-Baltensperger, 2012
- Ischnothyreus rex Kranz-Baltensperger, 2011
- Ischnothyreus serapi Kranz-Baltensperger, 2011
- Ischnothyreus tekek Kranz-Baltensperger, 2012
- Ischnothyreus tioman Kranz-Baltensperger, 2012
- Pelicinus churchillae Platnick, Dupérré, Ott, Baehr & Kranz-Baltensperger, 2012
- Pelicinus damieu Platnick, Dupérré, Ott, Baehr & Kranz-Baltensperger, 2012
- Pelicinus deelemanae Platnick, Dupérré, Ott, Baehr & Kranz-Baltensperger, 2012
- Pelicinus duong Platnick, Dupérré, Ott, Baehr & Kranz-Baltensperger, 2012
- Pelicinus johor Platnick, Dupérré, Ott, Baehr & Kranz-Baltensperger, 2012
- Pelicinus khao Platnick, Dupérré, Ott, Baehr & Kranz-Baltensperger, 2012
- Pelicinus koghis Platnick, Dupérré, Ott, Baehr & Kranz-Baltensperger, 2012
- Pelicinus lachivala Platnick, Dupérré, Ott, Baehr & Kranz-Baltensperger, 2012
- Pelicinus madurai Platnick, Dupérré, Ott, Baehr & Kranz-Baltensperger, 2012
- Pelicinus monteithi Platnick, Dupérré, Ott, Baehr & Kranz-Baltensperger, 2012
- Pelicinus penang Platnick, Dupérré, Ott, Baehr & Kranz-Baltensperger, 2012
- Pelicinus raveni Platnick, Dupérré, Ott, Baehr & Kranz-Baltensperger, 2012
- Pelicinus sayam Platnick, Dupérré, Ott, Baehr & Kranz-Baltensperger, 2012
- Pelicinus schwendingeri Platnick, Dupérré, Ott, Baehr & Kranz-Baltensperger, 2012
- Pelicinus sengleti Platnick, Dupérré, Ott, Baehr & Kranz-Baltensperger, 2012
- Pelicinus tham Platnick, Dupérré, Ott, Baehr & Kranz-Baltensperger, 2012
- Trilacuna diabolica Kranz-Baltensperger, 2011
- Trilacuna merapi Kranz-Baltensperger & Eichenberger, 2011

== Selected publications ==
Nentwig, W., Ansorg, J., Cushing, P. E., Kranz-Baltensperger, Y., & Kropf, C. (2024). Understanding and recognizing spiders. In W. Nentwig, J. Ansorg, P. E. Cushing, Y. Kranz-Baltensperger, & C. Kropf (Eds.), House spiders – Worldwide(pp. 3–9). Cham: Springer Nature Switzerland. https://doi.org/10.1007/978-3-031-42834-4_1

Hänggi, A., Bobbitt, I., Kranz-Baltensperger, Y., Bolzern, A., & Gilgado, J. D. (2021, September 30). Spiders (Araneae) from Swiss hothouses, with records of four species new for Switzerland. Arachnologische Mitteilungen: Arachnology Letters, 62(1), 67–74. https://doi.org/10.30963/aramit6207

Baur, H., Kranz-Baltensperger, Y., Cruaud, A., et al. (2014). Morphometric analysis and taxonomic revision of Anisopteromalus Ruschka (Hymenoptera: Chalcidoidea: Pteromalidae) – An integrative approach. Systematic Entomology, 39(6), 601–709. https://doi.org/10.1111/syen.12095

Platnick, N. I., Berniker, L., & Kranz-Baltensperger, Y. (2012). The goblin spider genus Ischnothyreus (Araneae, Oonopidae) in the New World. American Museum Novitates, 3759, 1–32. https://doi.org/10.1206/3759.2

Platnick, N. I., Dupérré, N., Ott, R., & Kranz-Baltensperger, Y. (2011, April 29). The goblin spider genus Brignolia(Araneae, Oonopidae). Bulletin of the American Museum of Natural History, 2011(349), 1–131. https://doi.org/10.1206/349.1

Kranz-Baltensperger, Y., Platnick, N. I., & Dupérré, N. (2009, August 28). A new genus of the spider family Caponiidae (Araneae, Haplogynae) from Iran. American Museum Novitates, 2009(3656), 1–12. https://doi.org/10.1206/3656.1
