= Pheidole harrisonfordi =

Scientific classification
- Kingdom: Animalia
- Phylum: Arthropoda
- Clade: Pancrustacea
- Class: Insecta
- Order: Hymenoptera
- Family: Formicidae
- Subfamily: Myrmicinae
- Genus: Pheidole
- Species: P. harrisonfordi

Binomial name
- Pheidole harrisonfordi (Wilson, 2002)
- The neotropical regions in the southern Americas

Species of ant

Pheidole harrisonfordi is a species of ant in the subfamily Myrmicinae. P. harrisonfordi lives in the Americas, mostly in neotropical countries such as Belize, Colombia, southern Mexico, Panama, Guatemala and other Central American nations. It primary lives in Santa Bárbara, Honduras 700 metres (2,300 ft) above sea level. The ant also inhabits wet forest leaf litter at an elevation of 1,600 metres (5,200 ft) above sea-level. P. harrisonfordi was named after the actor Harrison Ford in honor of his work in tropical conservation. Minor workers have a head length of 0.41 millimetres (0.016 in) and a head width of 0.38 millimetres (0.015 in). The head of minor workers are flattened with the mesonotal suture absent. Major workers have a head length of 0.78 millimetres (0.031 in) and a width of 0.75 millimetres (0.030 in).

== See also ==
- Calponia harrisonfordi
- Tachymenoides harrisonfordi
- List of organisms named after famous people (born 1925–1949)
