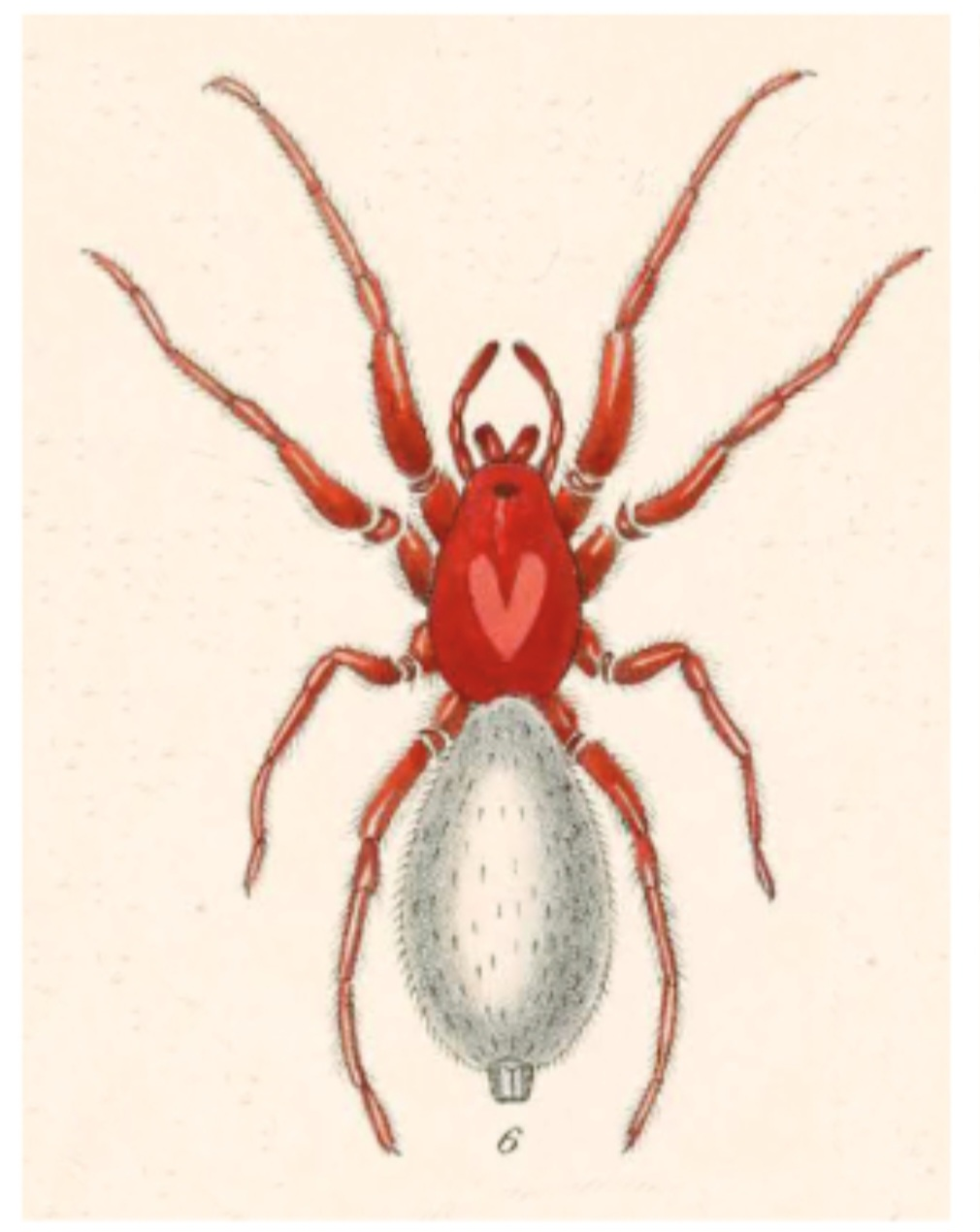
- Roddenberryus sargi

Scientific classification
- Domain: Eukaryota
- Kingdom: Animalia
- Phylum: Arthropoda
- Subphylum: Chelicerata
- Class: Arachnida
- Order: Araneae
- Infraorder: Araneomorphae
- Family: Caponiidae
- Genus: Roddenberryus; Sánchez-Ruiz - Bonaldo, 2023

Type species
- R. kirk Sánchez-Ruiz & Bonaldo, 2023

Species
- 5, see text

= Roddenberryus =

Genus of spiders

Roddenberryus is a genus of araneomorph spiders in the family Caponiidae, first described by Alexander Sánchez-Ruiz & Alexandre B. Bonaldo in 2023.

The genus was named after Gene Roddenberry, creator of the "Star Trek" franchise, "that inspired generations of kids to pursue scientific careers".

Three newly discovered species were named after characters from "Star Trek: The Original Series", created by Roddenberry: Roddenberryus kirk (named after James T. Kirk); R. mccoy (named after Leonard McCoy); and R. spock (named after Spock).

== Species ==
As of September 2023 it contains five species:

- Roddenberryus kirk Sánchez-Ruiz - Bonaldo, 2023 – Costa Rica
- Roddenberryus mccoy Sánchez-Ruiz - Bonaldo, 2023 – Mexico
- Roddenberryus pelegrina Bryant, 1940 – Cuba
- Roddenberryus sargi F. O. Pickard-Cambridge, 1899 – Guatemala, Costa Rica
- Roddenberryus spock Sánchez-Ruiz - Bonaldo, 2023 – Mexico
