= Tarsonops systematicus =

Scientific classification
- Domain: Eukaryota
- Kingdom: Animalia
- Phylum: Arthropoda
- Subphylum: Chelicerata
- Class: Arachnida
- Order: Araneae
- Infraorder: Araneomorphae
- Family: Caponiidae
- Genus: Tarsonops
- Species: T. systematicus

Binomial name
- Tarsonops systematicus Chamberlin, 1924

Species of spider

Tarsonops systematicus is a species of true spider in the family Caponiidae. It is found in Mexico.
