= Aamunops =

Scientific classification
- Kingdom: Animalia
- Phylum: Arthropoda
- Subphylum: Chelicerata
- Class: Arachnida
- Order: Araneae
- Infraorder: Araneomorphae
- Family: Caponiidae
- Genus: Aamunops; Galán-Sánchez & Álvarez-Padilla, 2022

Type species
- A. olmeca Galán-Sánchez & Álvarez-Padilla, 2022

Species
- 7, see text

Genus of spiders

Aamunops is a Mexican genus of spiders in the family Caponiidae.

== Distribution ==
This genus is endemic to Mexico. All species described in 2022 are found in the eastern part of the country.

== Etymology ==
The genus name is a combination of aamu, which means "spider" in the Popoluca de la Sierra language spoken in the south of Veracruz, and the ending -nops, commonly used for caponiid genera.

== Species ==
As of October 2025, this genus includes seven species:

- Aamunops chimpa Galán-Sánchez & Álvarez-Padilla, 2022 – Mexico
- Aamunops hoof Sánchez-Ruiz & Bonaldo, 2024 – Mexico
- Aamunops kalebi Chamé-Vázquez & Jiménez, 2024 – Mexico
- Aamunops misi Galán-Sánchez & Álvarez-Padilla, 2022 – Mexico
- Aamunops noono Galán-Sánchez & Álvarez-Padilla, 2022 – Mexico
- Aamunops olmeca Galán-Sánchez & Álvarez-Padilla, 2022 – Mexico (type species)
- Aamunops yiselae Sánchez-Ruiz & Bonaldo, 2024 – Mexico
