= Orthonops zebra =

Scientific classification
- Kingdom: Animalia
- Phylum: Arthropoda
- Subphylum: Chelicerata
- Class: Arachnida
- Order: Araneae
- Infraorder: Araneomorphae
- Family: Caponiidae
- Genus: Orthonops
- Species: O. zebra

Binomial name
- Orthonops zebra Platnick, 1995

Species of spider

Orthonops zebra is a species of true spider in the family Caponiidae. It is found in the United States.
