= Nopsma =

Scientific classification
- Kingdom: Animalia
- Phylum: Arthropoda
- Subphylum: Chelicerata
- Class: Arachnida
- Order: Araneae
- Infraorder: Araneomorphae
- Family: Caponiidae
- Genus: Nopsma; Sánchez-Ruiz, Brescovit & Bonaldo, 2020

Type species
- Nyetnops juchuy (Dupérré, 2014)

Species
- 7, see text

Genus of spiders

Nopsma is a genus of tropical spiders in the family Caponiidae. It was first described by A. Sánchez-Ruiz, Antônio Domingos Brescovit and A. B. Bonaldo in 2020. It was originally described under the name "Nyetnops juchuy" in 2014. They are found in Central and South America.

== Species ==
As of November 2021 it contains seven species:

- N. armandoi Sánchez-Ruiz, Brescovit & Bonaldo, 2020 – Nicaragua
- N. enriquei Sánchez-Ruiz, Brescovit & Bonaldo, 2020 – Peru
- N. florencia Sánchez-Ruiz, Brescovit & Bonaldo, 2020 – Colombia
- N. juchuy (Dupérré, 2014) – Ecuador
- N. leticia Sánchez-Ruiz, Martínez & Bonaldo, 2021 – Colombia
- N. macagual Sánchez-Ruiz, Martínez & Bonaldo, 2021 – Colombia
- N. paya Sánchez-Ruiz, Martínez & Bonaldo, 2021 – Colombia

== See also ==
- Nyetnops
