= Caponina papamanga =

Scientific classification
- Domain: Eukaryota
- Kingdom: Animalia
- Phylum: Arthropoda
- Subphylum: Chelicerata
- Class: Arachnida
- Order: Araneae
- Infraorder: Araneomorphae
- Family: Caponiidae
- Genus: Caponina
- Species: C. papamanga

Binomial name
- Caponina papamanga Brescovit & Sánchez Ruiz, 2013

Species of spider from the Brazilian Amazonia

Caponina papamanga is a species of araneomorph spider from the Brazilian Amazonia. It is the first species of the genus Caponina from the region. It belongs to the family Caponiidae, which is described as ecribellate and haplogyne.

== Description ==
Males of Caponina papamanga have a generally brownish cephalothorax, although the central part of the sternum is cream. The legs are also brownish. The abdomen is grayish. The total body length of the holotype is 3.1 mm, of which the flat carapace makes up 1.15 mm. The chelicerae have long fangs and a stridulatory apparatus on the lateral surface. The palpal bulb has a relatively wide base and a long, pointed embolus. Females have a similar coloration. The female paratype has a total body length of 3.15 mm, the carapace making up 1.1 mm, both lengths being very similar to the male holotype.

Caponina papamanga resembles C. alegre, but can be distinguished by features of the male and female genital organs.

== Taxonomy ==
Caponina papamanga was first described in 2013 by Antonio Brescovit and Alexander Sánchez Ruiz. Specimens were collected in pitfall traps near Belterra in the state of Pará in the Brazilian Amazonia. The specific name papamanga is based on a nickname for the inhabitants of Belterra, where there are many plantations of mango trees.

== Distribution ==
As of September 2020, the species was only known from the type location in Brazil (Belterra).
