= Nops branicki =

Scientific classification
- Kingdom: Animalia
- Phylum: Arthropoda
- Subphylum: Chelicerata
- Class: Arachnida
- Order: Araneae
- Infraorder: Araneomorphae
- Family: Caponiidae
- Genus: Nops
- Species: N. branicki

Binomial name
- Nops branicki (Taczanowski, 1874)

Species of spider

Nops branicki is a spider species found in French Guiana.
