= Carajas paraua =

Scientific classification
- Domain: Eukaryota
- Kingdom: Animalia
- Phylum: Arthropoda
- Subphylum: Chelicerata
- Class: Arachnida
- Order: Araneae
- Infraorder: Araneomorphae
- Family: Caponiidae
- Genus: Carajas; Brescovit & Sánchez-Ruiz, 2016
- Species: C. paraua

Binomial name
- Carajas paraua Brescovit & Sánchez-Ruiz, 2016

Species of spider

Carajas paraua is a species of spiders in the family Caponiidae. It was first described in 2016 by Brescovit & Sánchez-Ruiz. As of 2017, it is the only member of the genus Carajas. It is found in Brazil.
