= Medionops =

Scientific classification
- Domain: Eukaryota
- Kingdom: Animalia
- Phylum: Arthropoda
- Subphylum: Chelicerata
- Class: Arachnida
- Order: Araneae
- Infraorder: Araneomorphae
- Family: Caponiidae
- Genus: Medionops; Sánchez-Ruiz & Brescovit, 2017

Type species
- M. blades Sánchez-Ruiz & Brescovit, 2017

Species
- 7, see text

Genus of spiders

Medionops is a genus of araneomorph spiders in the family Caponiidae, first described by A. Sánchez-Ruiz & Antônio Domingos Brescovit in 2017.

== Species ==
As of April 2019 it contains seven species:

- Medionops blades Sánchez-Ruiz & Brescovit, 2017 — Colombia
- Medionops cesari (Dupérré, 2014) — Ecuador
- Medionops claudiae Sánchez-Ruiz & Brescovit, 2017 — Brazil
- Medionops murici Sánchez-Ruiz & Brescovit, 2017 — Brazil
- Medionops ramirezi Sánchez-Ruiz & Brescovit, 2017 — Brazil
- Medionops simla (Chickering, 1967) — Panama, Trinidad
- Medionops tabay Sánchez-Ruiz & Brescovit, 2017 — Venezuela
