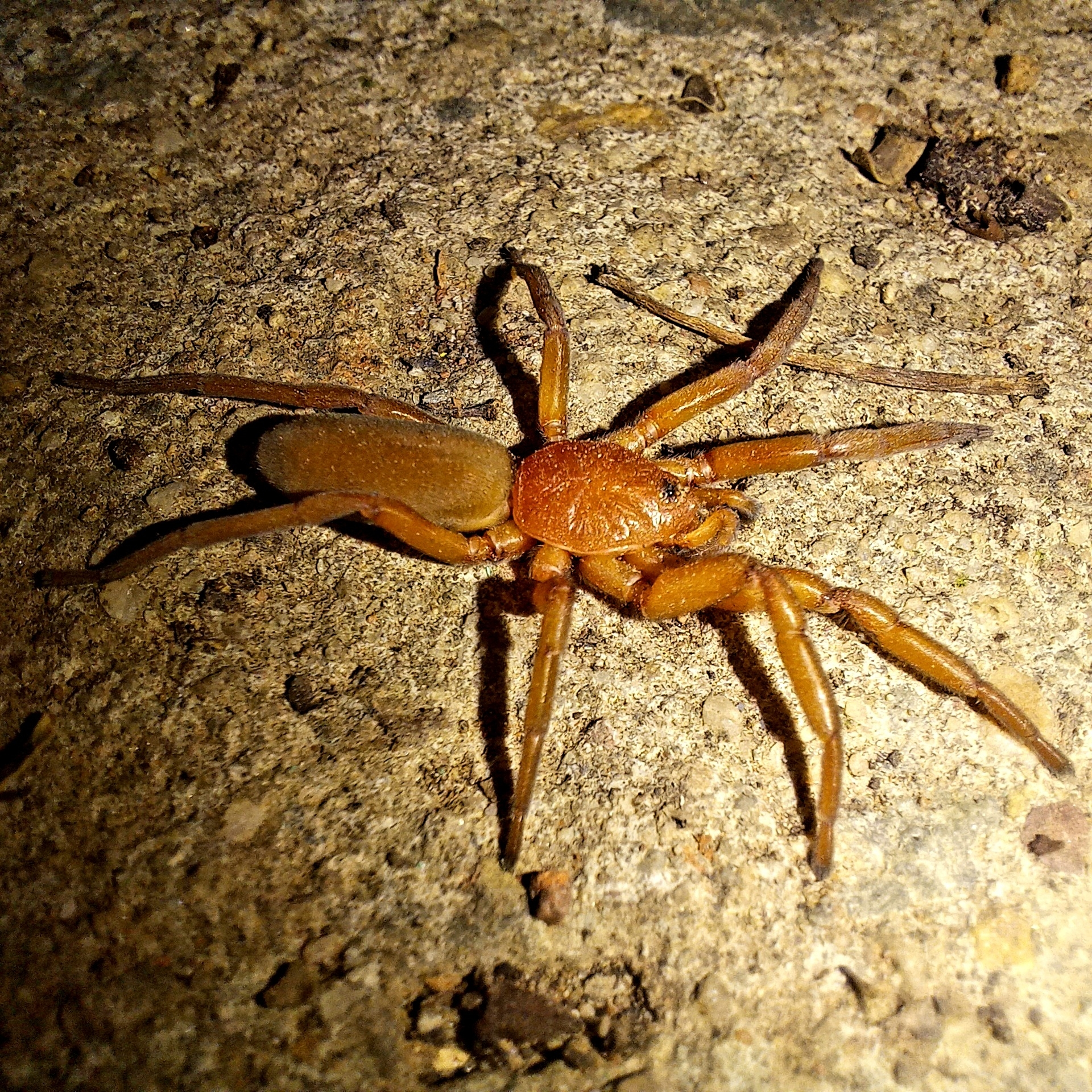
- C. capensis
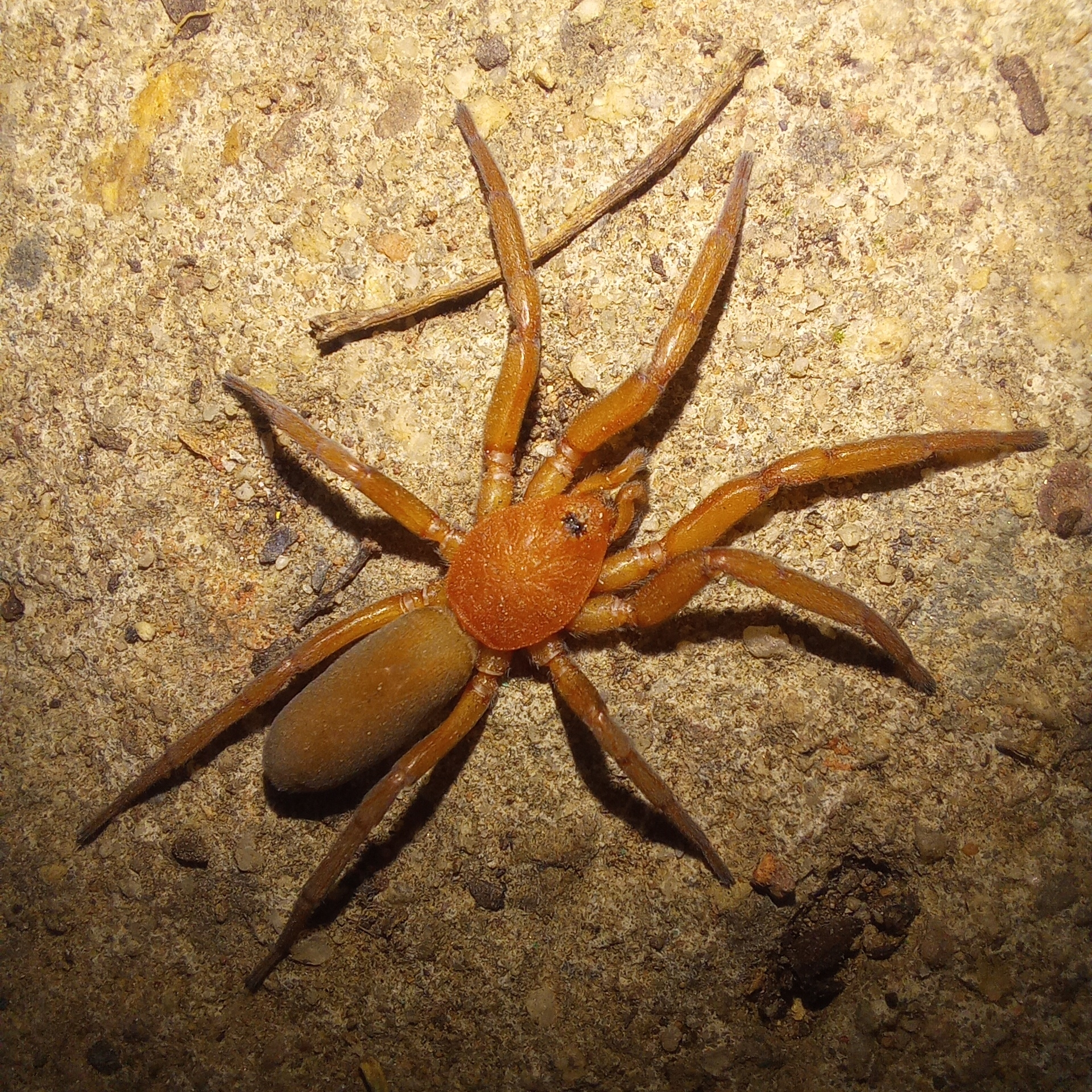

Conservation status
- Least Concern (SANBI Red List)

Scientific classification
- Kingdom: Animalia
- Phylum: Arthropoda
- Subphylum: Chelicerata
- Class: Arachnida
- Order: Araneae
- Infraorder: Araneomorphae
- Family: Caponiidae
- Genus: Caponia
- Species: C. capensis

Binomial name
- Caponia capensis Purcell, 1904

= Caponia capensis =

Cape Orange Lungless Spider

Species of spider

Caponia capensis is a species of spider of the genus Caponia. It is found in Namibia, Mozambique, and South Africa.

== Distribution ==
Caponia capensis has been recorded from three provinces in South Africa: the Eastern Cape, Northern Cape, and Western Cape. Notable localities include Table Mountain National Park, De Hoop Nature Reserve, Cederberg Wilderness Area, and Bontebok National Park.

== Habitat ==
The species is a free-living ground dweller that wanders around on the ground surface. These spiders are active at night and are swift runners that pursue their prey over the ground. They are frequently sampled in pitfall traps from the Grassland and Fynbos biomes.

== Conservation ==
Caponia capensis is listed as Least Concern due to its wide geographical range and lack of significant threats. The species is found at elevations ranging from 7 to 1,172 m above sea level.

The species is protected in De Hoop Nature Reserve, Cederberg Wilderness Area, Table Mountain National Park, and Bontebok National Park.

== Description ==
Both males and females are known for this species.
