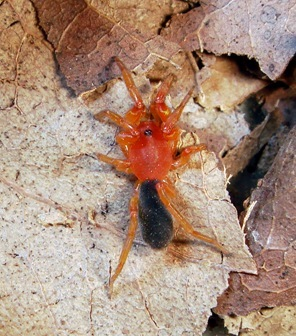
- Nops guanabacoae male, Cuba

Scientific classification
- Domain: Eukaryota
- Kingdom: Animalia
- Phylum: Arthropoda
- Subphylum: Chelicerata
- Class: Arachnida
- Order: Araneae
- Infraorder: Araneomorphae
- Family: Caponiidae
- Genus: Nops
- Species: N. guanabacoae

Binomial name
- Nops guanabacoae MacLeay, 1839
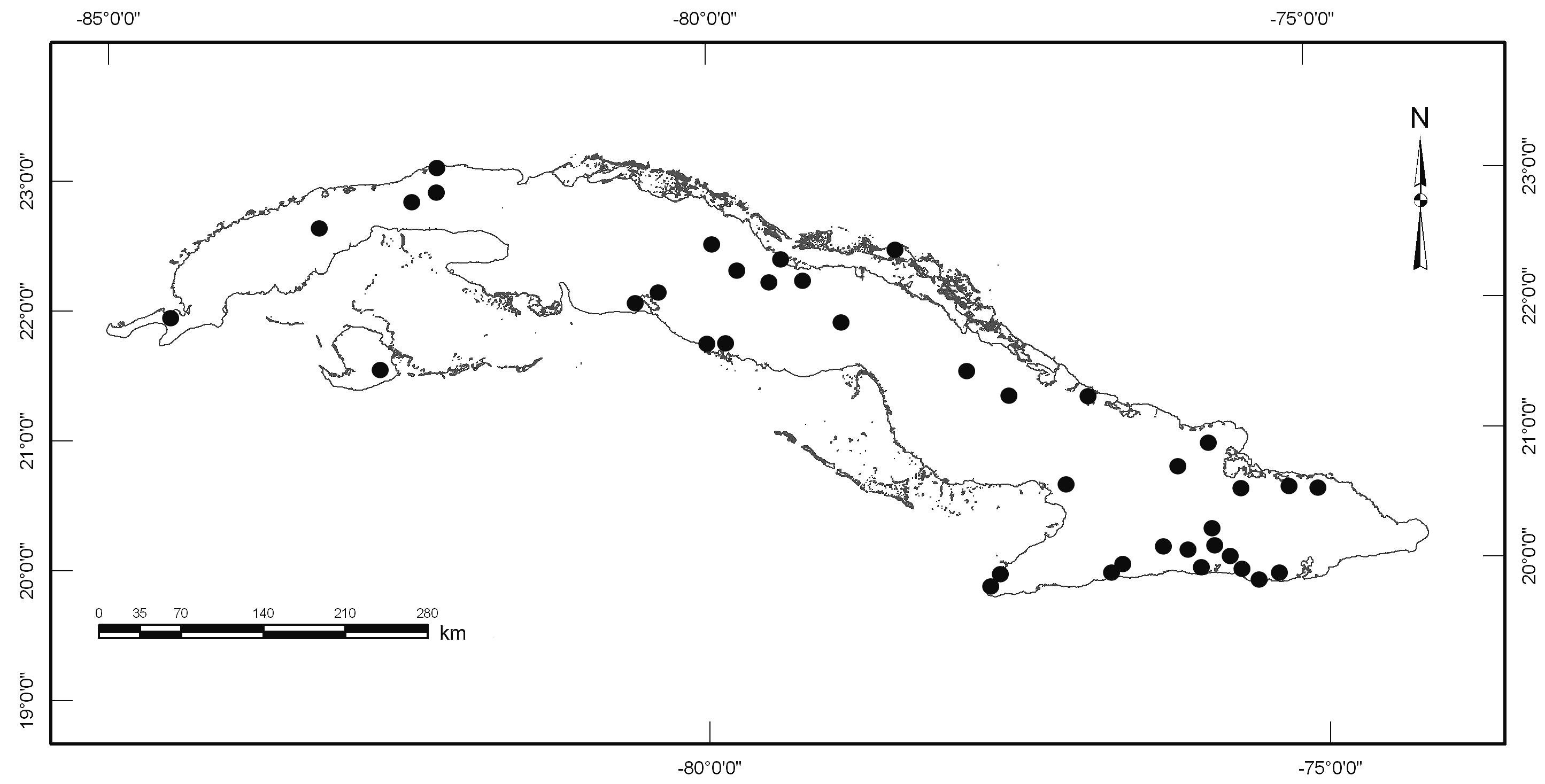
- Distribution of Nops guanabacoae

= Nops guanabacoae =

Species of spider

Nops guanabacoae is a species of medium-sized caponiid spider with only two eyes and carapace uniformly orange. N. guanabacoae is the type species of genus Nops, more information on this article.

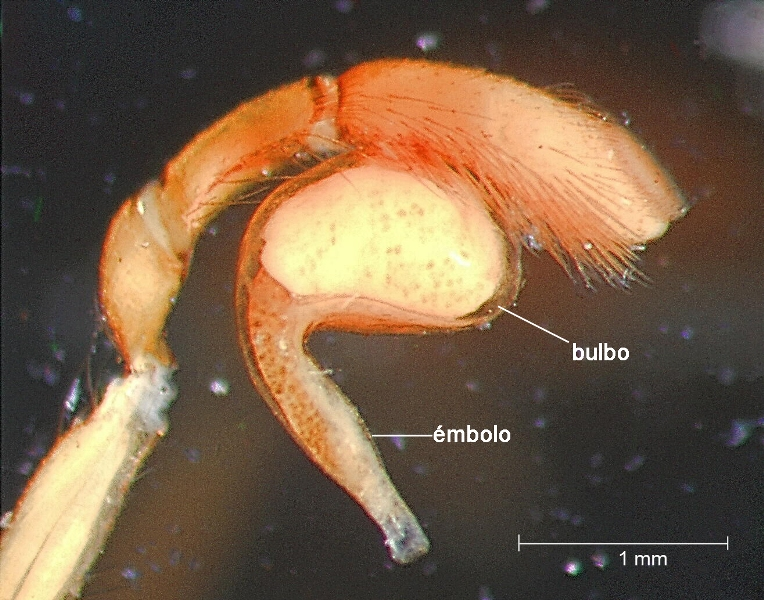
Male palp of Nops guanabacoae.

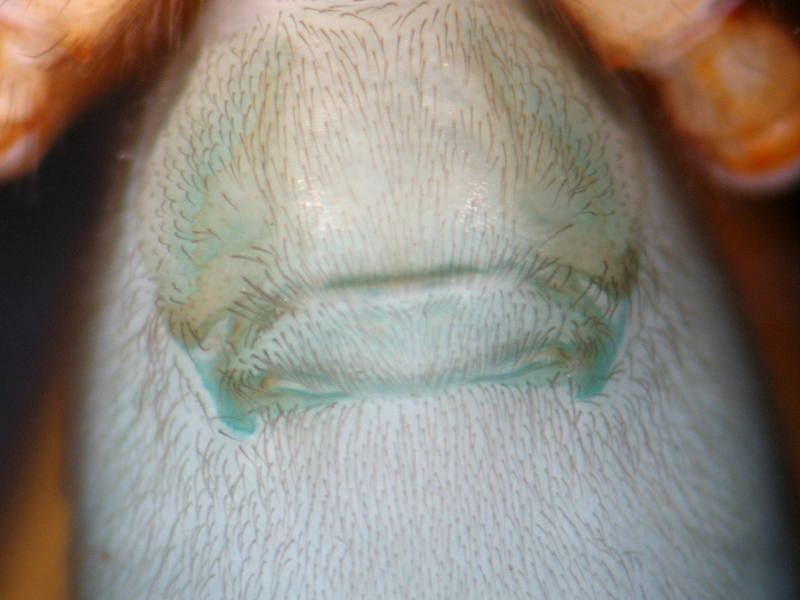
External female genitalia of Nops guanabacoae.

== Description ==
Differ from other Nops species by the male and female genitalia.

== Distribution ==
Extensively distributed throughout the archipelago of Cuba.

== Habitat ==
Soil spiders inhabiting preferably under stones and in leaf litter.

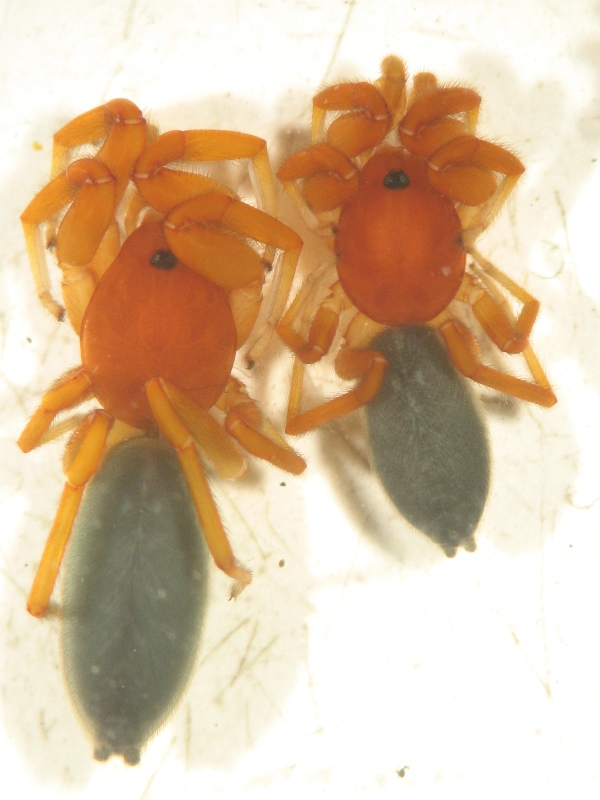
Nops guanabacoae female (right) and male (left), dorsal view.

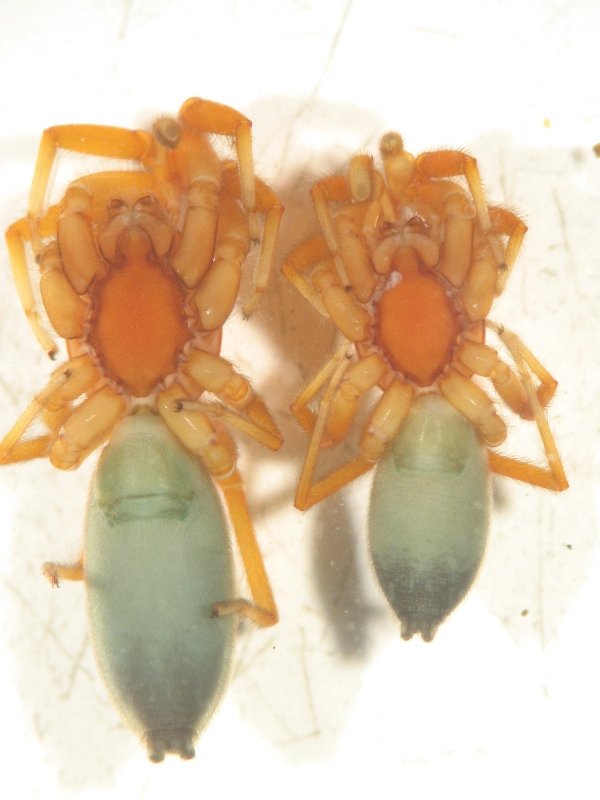
Nops guanabacoae female (right) and male (left), ventral view.

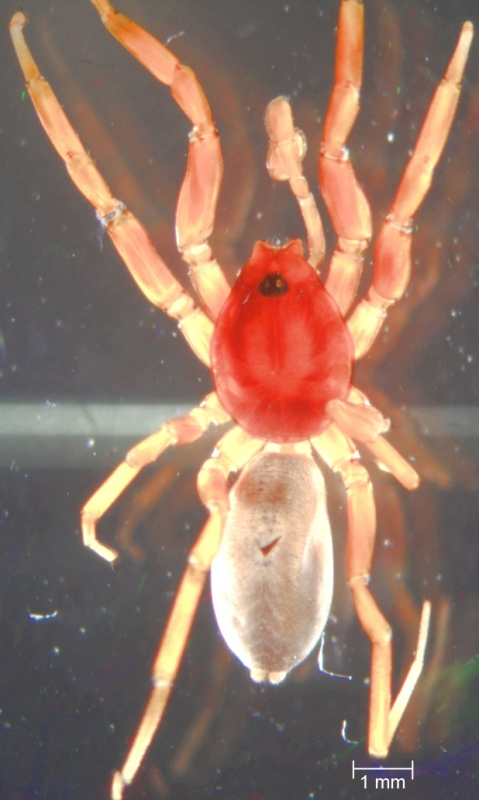
Nops guanabacoae male allotype describe by Bryant (1940), dorsal view.
