= Iraponia =

Scientific classification
- Kingdom: Animalia
- Phylum: Arthropoda
- Subphylum: Chelicerata
- Class: Arachnida
- Order: Araneae
- Infraorder: Araneomorphae
- Family: Caponiidae
- Genus: Iraponia; Kranz-Baltensperger, Platnick & Dupérré, 2009
- Species: I. scutata

Binomial name
- Iraponia scutata Kranz-Baltensperger, Platnick & Dupérré, 2009

Genus of spiders

Iraponia is a monotypic genus of Asian araneomorph spiders in the family Caponiidae, containing the single species, Iraponia scutata. It was first described by Y. Kranz-Baltensperger, Norman I. Platnick & N. Dupérré in 2009, and has only been found in Iran.
