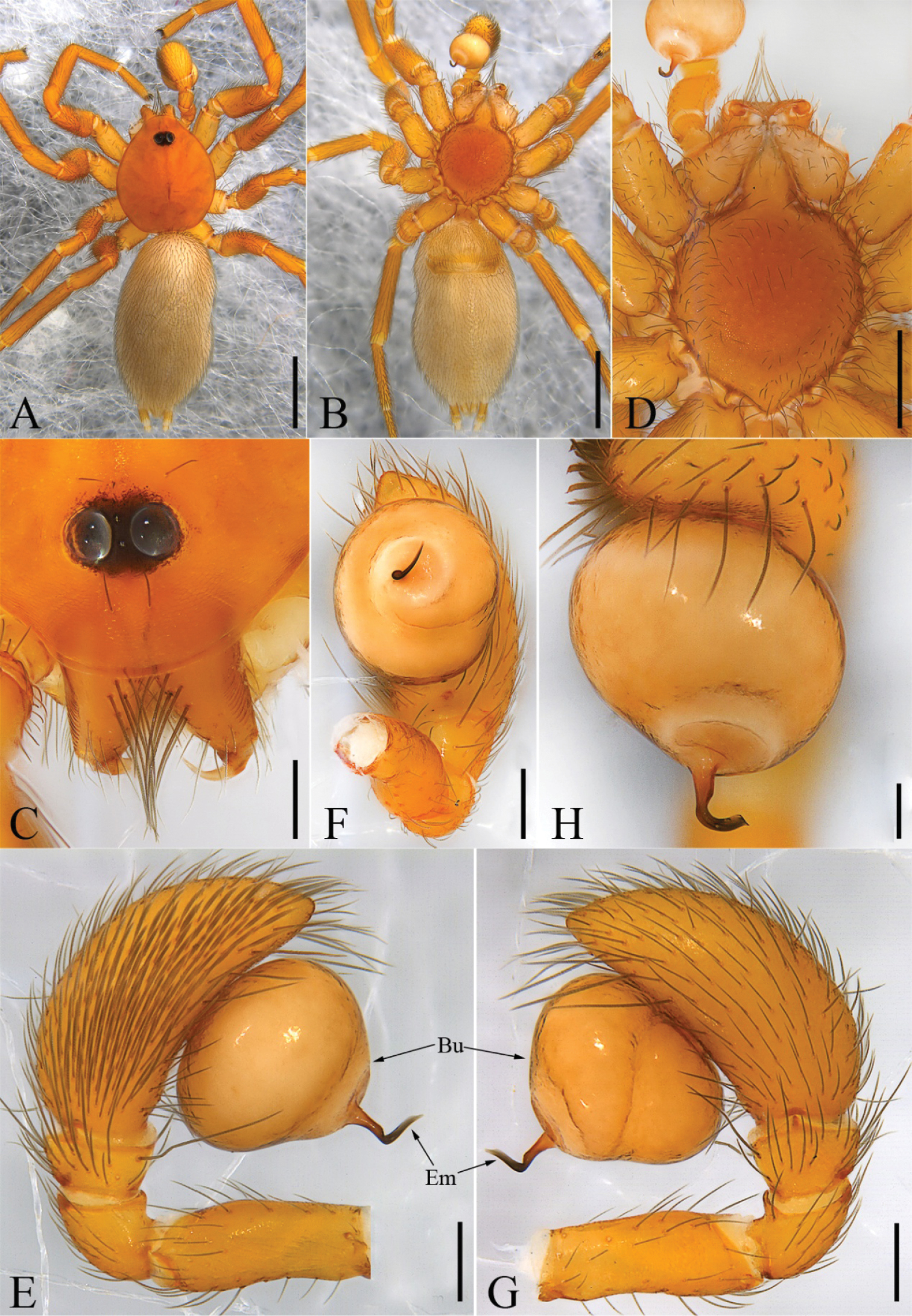
- Laoponia saetosa

Scientific classification
- Kingdom: Animalia
- Phylum: Arthropoda
- Subphylum: Chelicerata
- Class: Arachnida
- Order: Araneae
- Infraorder: Araneomorphae
- Family: Caponiidae
- Genus: Laoponia; Platnick & Jäger, 2008

Type species
- L. saetosa Platnick & Jäger, 2008

Species
- L. pseudosaetosa Liu, Li & Pham, 2010 – Vietnam; L. saetosa Platnick & Jäger, 2008 – Laos, Vietnam

= Laoponia =

Genus of spiders

Laoponia is a genus of Southeast Asian araneomorph spiders in the family Caponiidae, first described by Norman I. Platnick & Peter Jäger in 2008. As of April 2019 it contains only two species.
