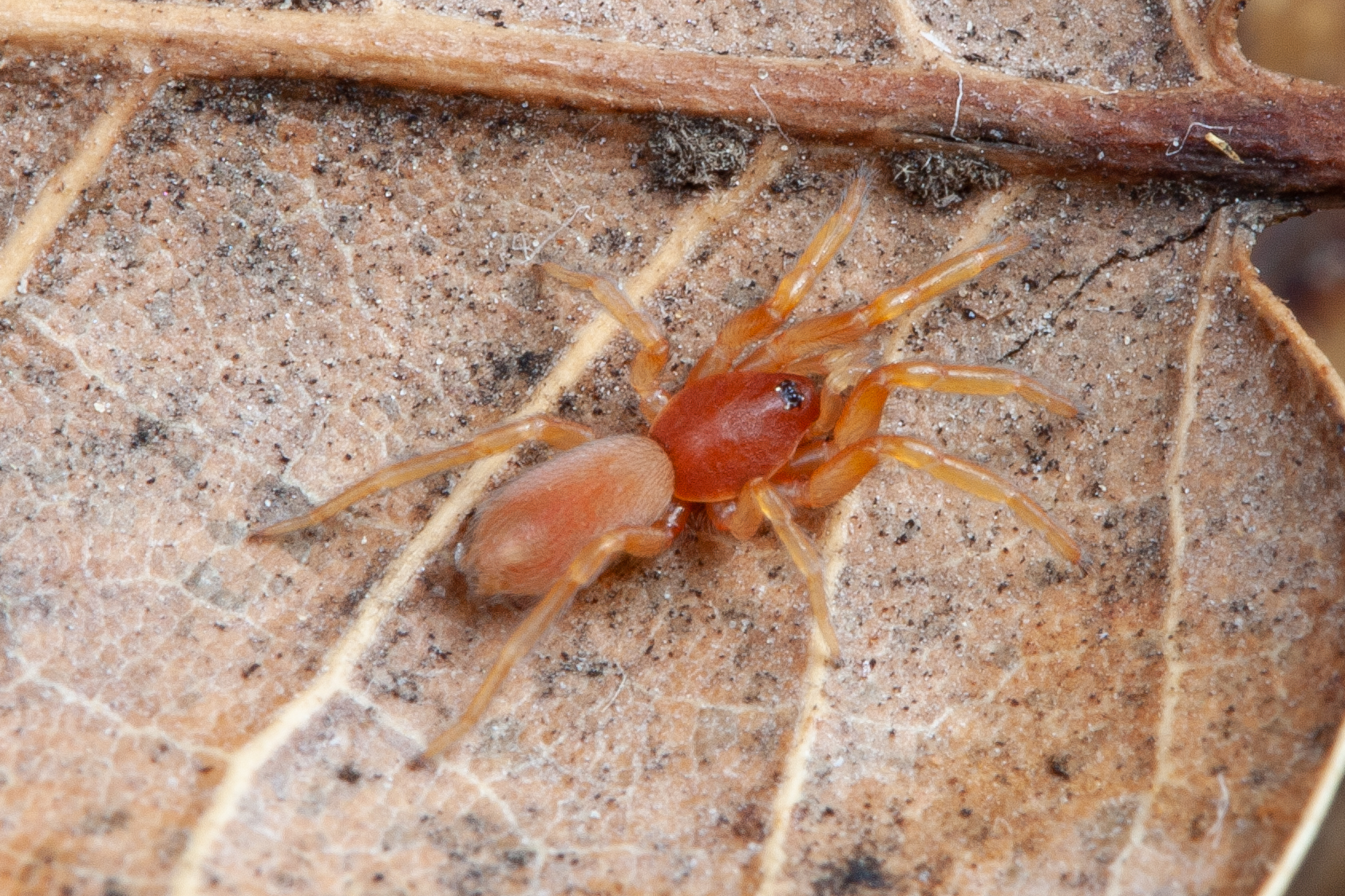

Scientific classification
- Kingdom: Animalia
- Phylum: Arthropoda
- Subphylum: Chelicerata
- Class: Arachnida
- Order: Araneae
- Infraorder: Araneomorphae
- Family: Caponiidae
- Genus: Calponia; Platnick, 1993
- Species: C. harrisonfordi

Binomial name
- Calponia harrisonfordi Platnick, 1993

= Calponia =

Genus of spiders

Calponia is a monotypic genus of araneomorph spiders in the family Caponiidae, containing the single species, Calponia harrisonfordi. It was first described in 1993 by Norman I. Platnick, who named the type species after the film actor Harrison Ford to thank him for narrating a documentary for the Natural History Museum in London. It has only been found in California in the United States.

== Description ==
It is roughly 5 millimetres (0.20 in) in length, and is one of the most primitive members of its family. Unlike its more modern relatives, it has few of the family's characteristic distal leg segment modifications and retains all eight eyes. Much of its physiology is not well understood, but it is thought to eat other spiders.

== See also ==
- Pheidole harrisonfordi
- Tachymenoides harrisonfordi
- List of organisms named after famous people (born 1925–1949)
