= Nasutonops =

Scientific classification
- Domain: Eukaryota
- Kingdom: Animalia
- Phylum: Arthropoda
- Subphylum: Chelicerata
- Class: Arachnida
- Order: Araneae
- Infraorder: Araneomorphae
- Family: Caponiidae
- Genus: Nasutonops; Sánchez-Ruiz

Type species
- Nasutonops xaxado

Species
- Nasutonops chapeu Brescovit & Sánchez-Ruiz, 2016; Nasutonops sincora Brescovit & Sánchez-Ruiz, 2016; Nasutonops xaxado Brescovit & Sánchez-Ruiz, 2016

Genus of spiders

Nasutonops is a genus of spiders in the family Caponiidae. It was first described in 2016 by Brescovit & Sánchez-Ruiz. As of 2017, it contains 3 species, all from Brazil.
