= Caponina =

Scientific classification
- Kingdom: Animalia
- Phylum: Arthropoda
- Subphylum: Chelicerata
- Class: Arachnida
- Order: Araneae
- Infraorder: Araneomorphae
- Family: Caponiidae
- Genus: Caponina; Simon, 1892

Type species
- C. testacea Simon, 1892

Species
- 12, see text

Synonyms
- Bruchnops Mello-Leitão, 1939

Genus of spiders

Caponina is a genus of araneomorph spiders in the family Caponiidae, first described by Eugène Simon in 1892.

== Species ==
As of September 2023 it contains thirteen species:

- Caponina alegre Platnick, 1994 – Brazil
- Caponina alejandroi Sánchez-Ruiz, Martínez & Bonaldo, 2022 - Colombia
- Caponina bochalema Sánchez-Ruiz, Martínez & Bonaldo, 2022 - Colombia
- Caponina cajabamba Platnick, 1994 – Peru
- Caponina chilensis Platnick, 1994 – Chile
- Caponina chinacota Platnick, 1994 – Colombia
- Caponina huila Sánchez-Ruiz, Martínez & Bonaldo, 2022 - Colombia
- Caponina longipes Simon, 1893 – Venezuela
- Caponina notabilis (Mello-Leitão, 1939) – Brazil, Uruguay, Argentina
- Caponina papamanga Brescovit & Sánchez-Ruiz, 2013 – Brazil
- Caponina paramo Platnick, 1994 – Colombia
- Caponina testacea Simon, 1892 (type) – St. Vincent
- Caponina tijuca Platnick, 1994 – Brazil
