= Nyetnops =

Scientific classification
- Kingdom: Animalia
- Phylum: Arthropoda
- Subphylum: Chelicerata
- Class: Arachnida
- Order: Araneae
- Infraorder: Araneomorphae
- Family: Caponiidae
- Genus: Nyetnops; Platnick & Lise, 2007

Type species
- N. guarani Platnick & Lise, 2007

Species
- N. guarani Platnick & Lise, 2007 – Brazil; N. juchuy Dupérré, 2014 – Ecuador

Genus of spiders

Nyetnops is a genus of South American araneomorph spiders in the family Caponiidae, first described by Norman I. Platnick & A. A. Lise in 2007. As of April 2019 it contains only two species.
