= Taintnops =

Scientific classification
- Kingdom: Animalia
- Phylum: Arthropoda
- Subphylum: Chelicerata
- Class: Arachnida
- Order: Araneae
- Infraorder: Araneomorphae
- Family: Caponiidae
- Genus: Taintnops; Platnick, 1994

Type species
- T. goloboffi Platnick, 1994

Species
- T. goloboffi Platnick, 1994 – Chile; T. paposo Brescovit & Sánchez-Ruiz, 2016 – Chile

Genus of spiders

Taintnops is a genus of South American araneomorph spiders in the family Caponiidae, first described by Norman I. Platnick in 1994. As of April 2019 it contains only two species, both found in Chile.
