= Tisentnops =

Scientific classification
- Kingdom: Animalia
- Phylum: Arthropoda
- Subphylum: Chelicerata
- Class: Arachnida
- Order: Araneae
- Infraorder: Araneomorphae
- Family: Caponiidae
- Genus: Tisentnops; Platnick, 1994

Type species
- T. leopoldi (Zapfe, 1962)

Species
- T. leopoldi (Zapfe, 1962) – Chile; T. mineiro Brescovit & Sánchez-Ruiz, 2016 – Brazil; T. onix Brescovit & Sánchez-Ruiz, 2016 – Brazil

Genus of spiders

Tisentnops is a genus of South American araneomorph spiders in the family Caponiidae, first described by Norman I. Platnick in 1994. As of April 2019 it contains only three species.
