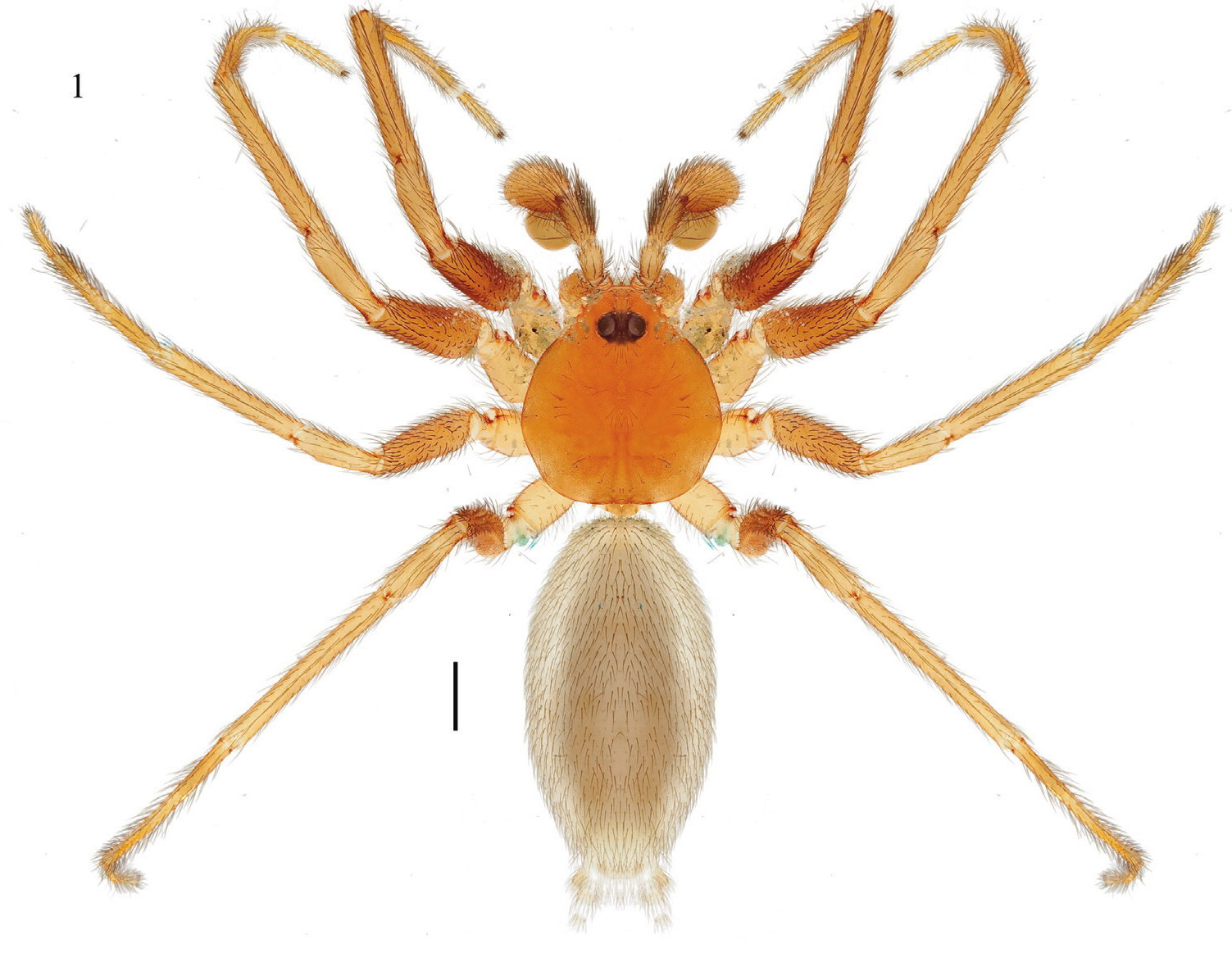
- T. irataylori

Scientific classification
- Kingdom: Animalia
- Phylum: Arthropoda
- Subphylum: Chelicerata
- Class: Arachnida
- Order: Araneae
- Infraorder: Araneomorphae
- Family: Caponiidae
- Genus: Tarsonops; Chamberlin, 1924

Type species
- T. sectipes Chamberlin, 1924

Species
- 7, see text
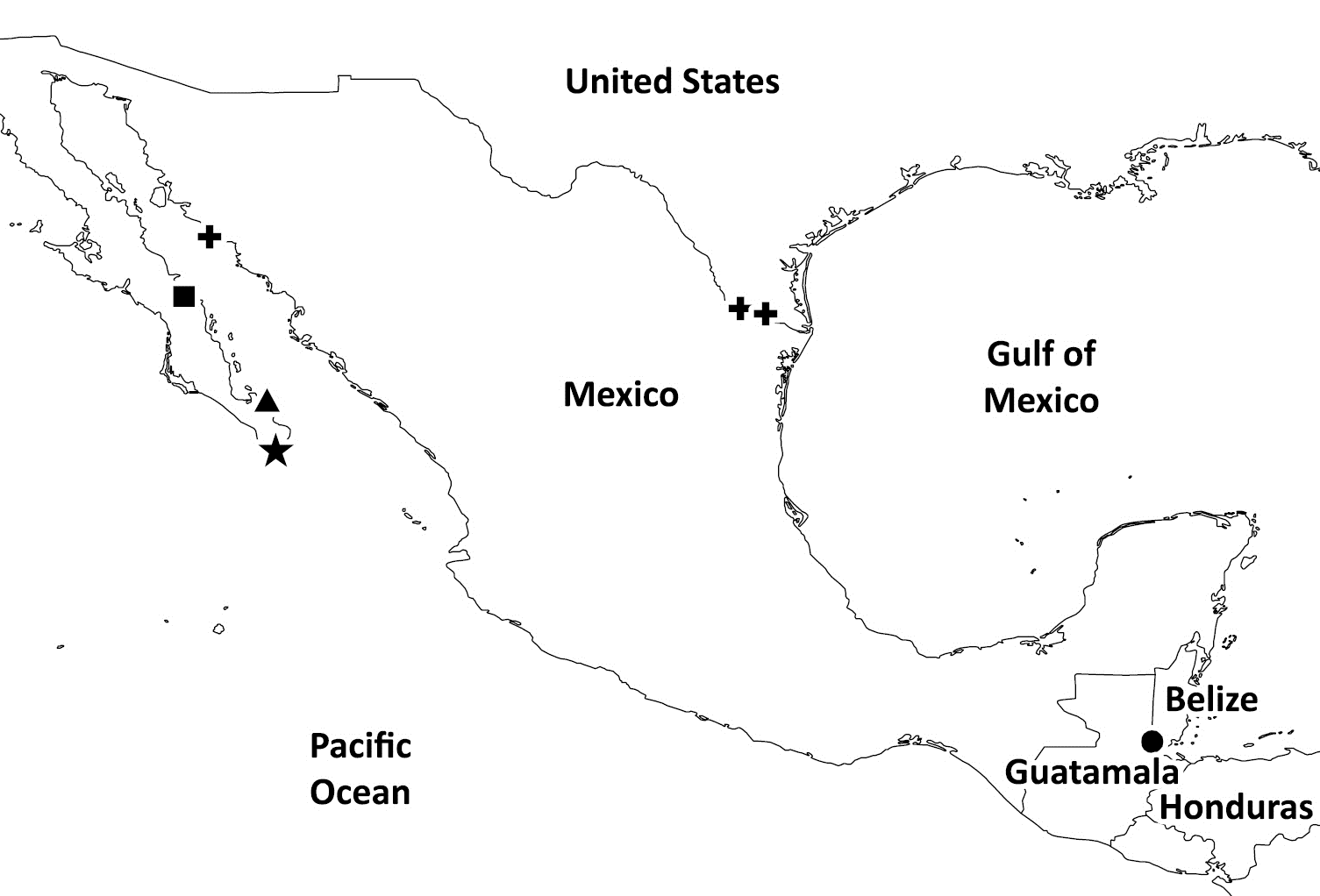

= Tarsonops =

Genus of spiders

Tarsonops is a genus of araneomorph spiders in the family Caponiidae, first described by Ralph Vary Chamberlin in 1924.

== Species ==
As of March 2019 it contains seven species:

- Tarsonops ariguanabo (Alayón, 1986) — Cuba, Panama
- Tarsonops clavis Chamberlin, 1924 — Mexico
- Tarsonops coronilla Sánchez-Ruiz & Brescovit, 2015 — Mexico
- Tarsonops irataylori Bond & Taylor, 2013 — Belize
- Tarsonops sectipes Chamberlin, 1924 — Mexico
- Tarsonops sternalis (Banks, 1898) — Mexico
- Tarsonops systematicus Chamberlin, 1924 — Mexico
