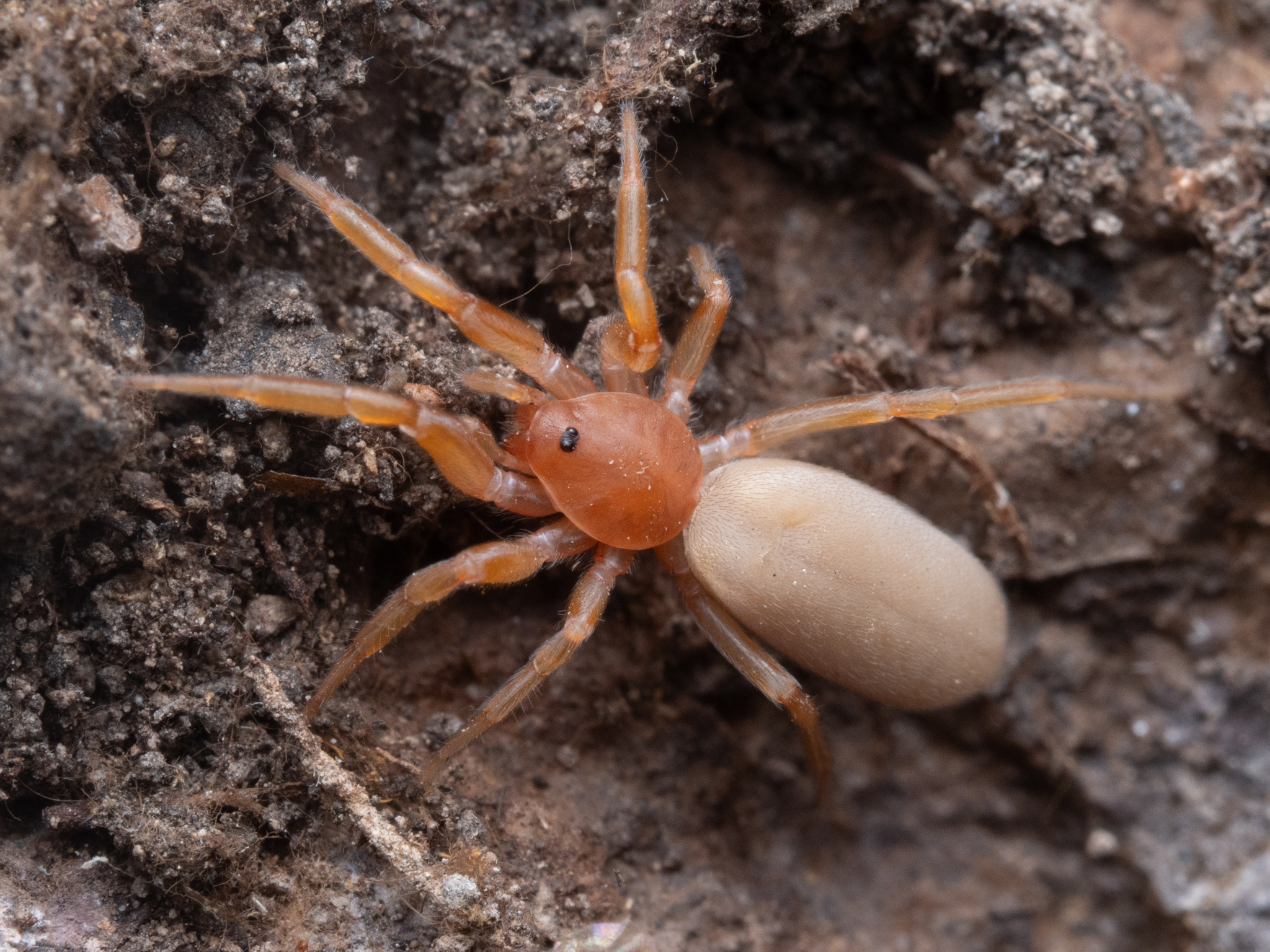
- O. lapanus from Texas

Scientific classification
- Kingdom: Animalia
- Phylum: Arthropoda
- Subphylum: Chelicerata
- Class: Arachnida
- Order: Araneae
- Infraorder: Araneomorphae
- Family: Caponiidae
- Genus: Orthonops; Chamberlin, 1924

Type species
- O. overtus Chamberlin, 1924

Species
- 10, see text

= Orthonops =

Genus of spiders

Orthonops is a genus of North American araneomorph spiders in the family Caponiidae, first described by R. V. Chamberlin in 1924.

== Species ==
As of April 2022 it contains 10 species in the southwest United States and Mexico:

- Orthonops confuso (Galán-Sánchez & Álvarez-Padilla, 2022) – Mexico
- Orthonops gertschi Chamberlin, 1928 – USA
- Orthonops giulianii Platnick, 1995 – USA
- Orthonops icenoglei Platnick, 1995 – USA, Mexico
- Orthonops iviei Platnick, 1995 – USA
- Orthonops johnsoni Platnick, 1995 – USA
- Orthonops lapanus Gertsch & Mulaik, 1940 – USA
- Orthonops ovalis (Banks, 1898) – Mexico
- Orthonops overtus Chamberlin, 1924 (type) – Mexico
- Orthonops zebra Platnick, 1995 – USA
