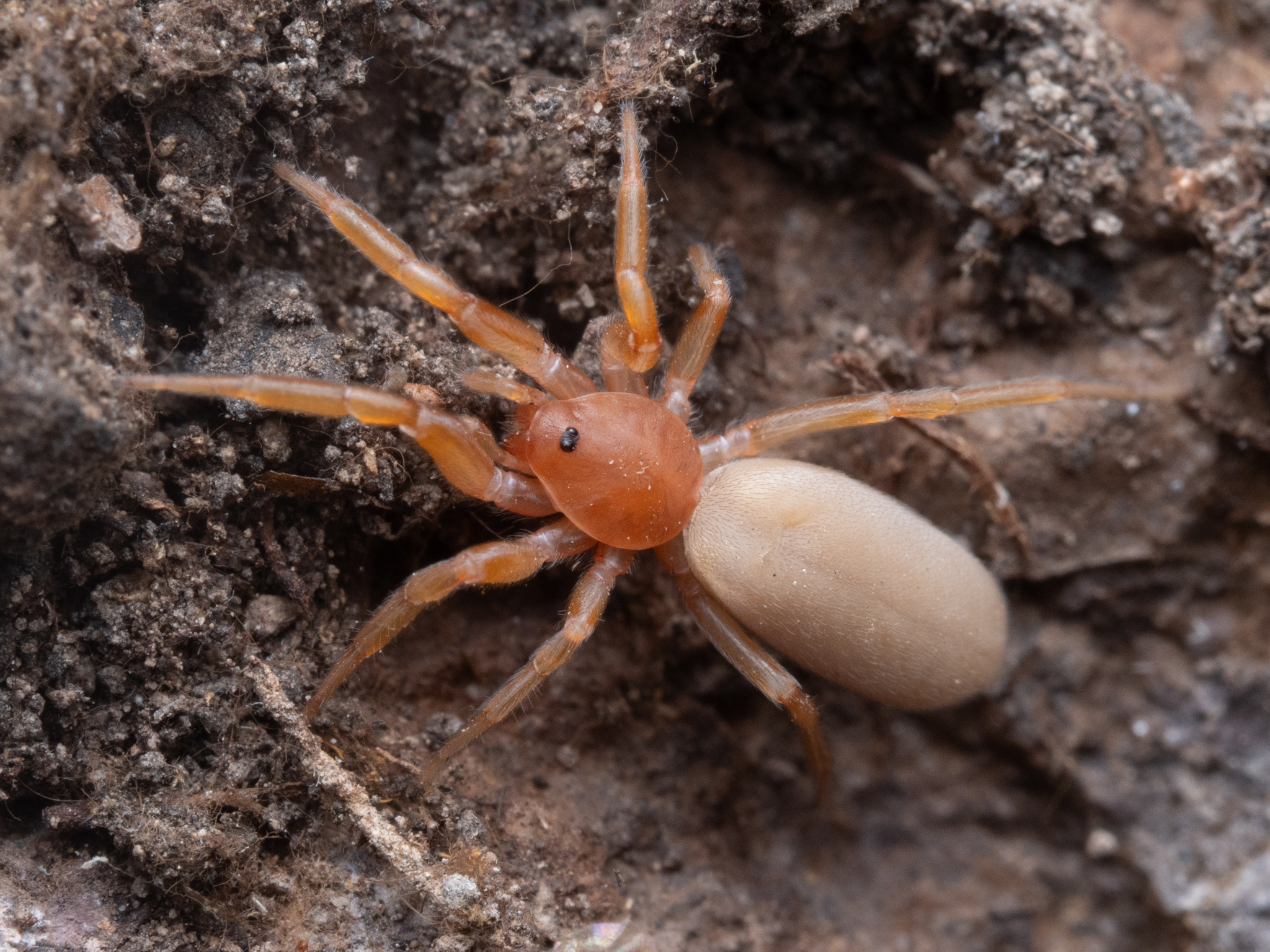
- Orthonops lapanus from Texas
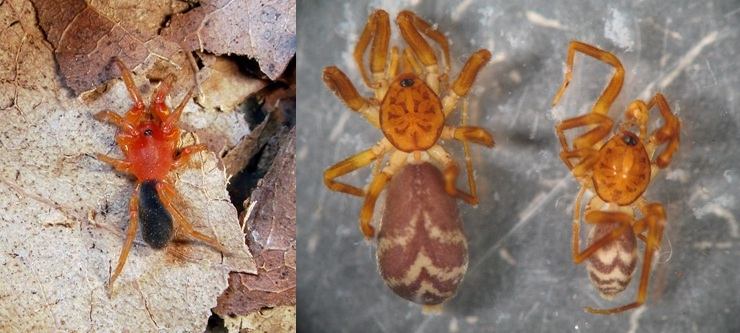
- Left: Nops guanabacoae Middle and right: Cubanops alayoni female and male

Scientific classification
- Kingdom: Animalia
- Phylum: Arthropoda
- Subphylum: Chelicerata
- Class: Arachnida
- Order: Araneae
- Infraorder: Araneomorphae
- Family: Caponiidae; Simon, 1890

Diversity
- 21 genera, 157 species
- blue: reported countries (WSC)

= Caponiidae =

Caponiidae Temporal range: Neogene–present

Family of spiders

Caponiidae is a family of ecribellate haplogyne spiders that are unusual in a number of ways. They differ from other spiders in lacking book lungs and having the posterior median spinnerets anteriorly displaced to form a transverse row with the anterior lateral spinnerets. Most species have only two eyes, which is also unusual among spiders. A few species of Caponiidae variously have four, six or eight eyes. In some species the number of eyes will increase when the spiderling changes its skin as it grows towards adulthood.

== Description ==
These spiders of about 2 to 5 millimetres (0.079 to 0.197 in) are rarely noticed, but generally look like somewhat faded woodlouse hunter spiders in the genus Dysdera. The carapace (cephalothorax or prosoma) is orange and the abdomen (opisthosoma) light gray. The two-eyed species have their two eyes in the anterior middle of the carapace.

=== Eye numbers ===
Caponiidae are unusual in the degree to which the eye number varies. In this they surpass even the family Cybaeidae in which some species have two eyes, some six, and some eight. In some species of the Caponiidae paired eyes meet in the midline, giving the spider in effect, an odd number of eyes. The following genera have eyes as follows:

- Eight eyes: Calponia, Caponia (but latter may also have two, three, four or 'five' eyes)
- Six eyes: Iraponia
- Four eyes: Nopsides, Notnops
- Two eyes: Cubanops, Diploglena, Laoponia, Medionops, Nops, Nopsma, Nyetnops, Orthonops, Taintnops, Tarsonops, Tisentnops.

== Habits ==
Their habits are for the most part unknown. At least some species are known to hunt other spiders.

== Relationships ==
The fact that they are ecribellate and haplogyne suggests that they might be relatively primitive. Calponia harrisonfordi from California seems to be the most primitive member of the family. Their phylogenetic relationships have long been enigmatic, but in the early 1990s it was determined that they are probably a sister group of the Tetrablemmidae plus the four families inside the superfamily Dysderoidea.

The subfamily Nopinae consists at least of the genera Nops, Nopsides, Orthonops and Tarsonops. The remaining genera are unlikely to form a monophyletic group.

== Distribution ==
The family is found in Africa and the Americas from Argentina to the United States.

== Names ==
Calponia is a contraction of Californian Caponia, because the single species Calponia harrisonfordi has, like the African genus Caponia eight eyes. The species name is in honor of Harrison Ford, recognizing his efforts on behalf of the American Museum of Natural History.

The Chilean caponiid fauna differs from that of the rest of the Neotropics in lacking members of the Nopinae (named after the genus Nops). Three genera newly described by Norman I. Platnick in 1994 were thus named Notnops, Taintnops and Tisentnops, emphasizing this fact. The only Taintnops species, T. goloboffi, is named in honor of one of the collectors, P.A. Goloboff.

== Genera ==
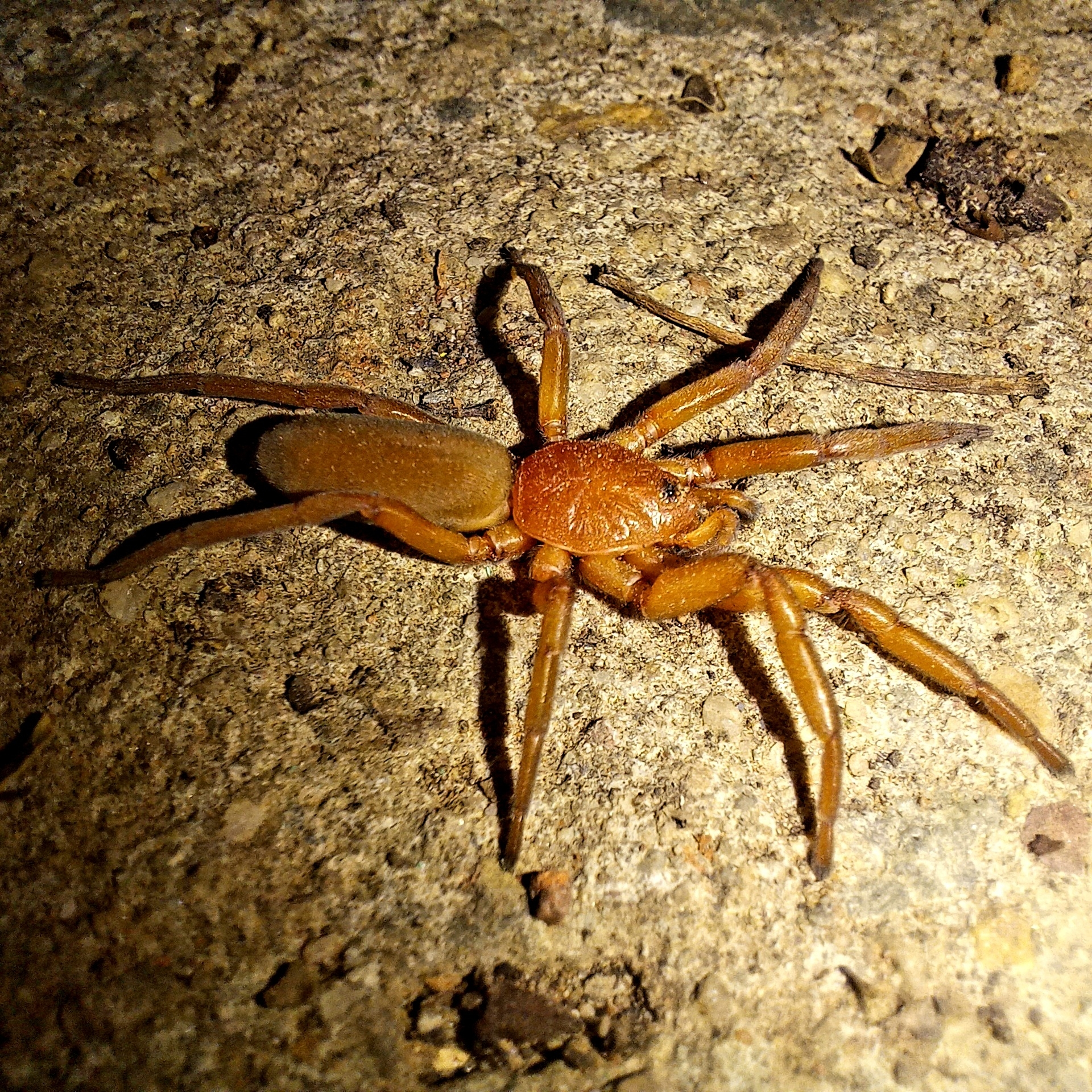
Caponia capensis from South Africa

As of January 2026, this family includes 21 genera and 157 species:

- Aamunops Galán-Sánchez & Álvarez-Padilla, 2022 – Mexico
- Calponia Platnick, 1993 – United States
- Caponia Simon, 1887 – Mozambique, Tanzania, Southern Africa
- Caponina Simon, 1892 – St. Vincent, South America
- Carajas Brescovit & Sánchez-Ruiz, 2016 – Brazil
- Cubanops Sánchez-Ruiz, Platnick & Dupérré, 2010 – Caribbean
- Diploglena Purcell, 1904 – Botswana, Namibia, South Africa
- Iraponia Kranz-Baltensperger, Platnick & Dupérré, 2009 – Iran
- Laoponia Platnick & Jäger, 2008 – China, Laos, Vietnam
- Medionops Sánchez-Ruiz & Brescovit, 2017 – Trinidad, Panama, South America
- Nasutonops Brescovit & Sánchez-Ruiz, 2016 – Brazil
- Nops MacLeay, 1839 – North America, South America, Navassa Islands, Netherlands Antilles, Saint Vincent and the Grenadines
- Nopsides Chamberlin, 1924 – Mexico, possibly Peru
- Nopsma Sánchez-Ruiz, Brescovit & Bonaldo, 2020 – Nicaragua, Colombia, Ecuador, Peru
- Notnops Platnick, 1994 – Chile
- Nyetnops Platnick & Lise, 2007 – Bolivia, Brazil, Peru
- Orthonops Chamberlin, 1924 – Mexico, United States
- Roddenberryus Sánchez-Ruiz & Bonaldo, 2023 – Cuba, Costa Rica, Guatemala, Mexico
- Taintnops Platnick, 1994 – Chile
- Tarsonops Chamberlin, 1924 – Cuba, Belize, Panama, Mexico
- Tisentnops Platnick, 1994 – Brazil, Chile
