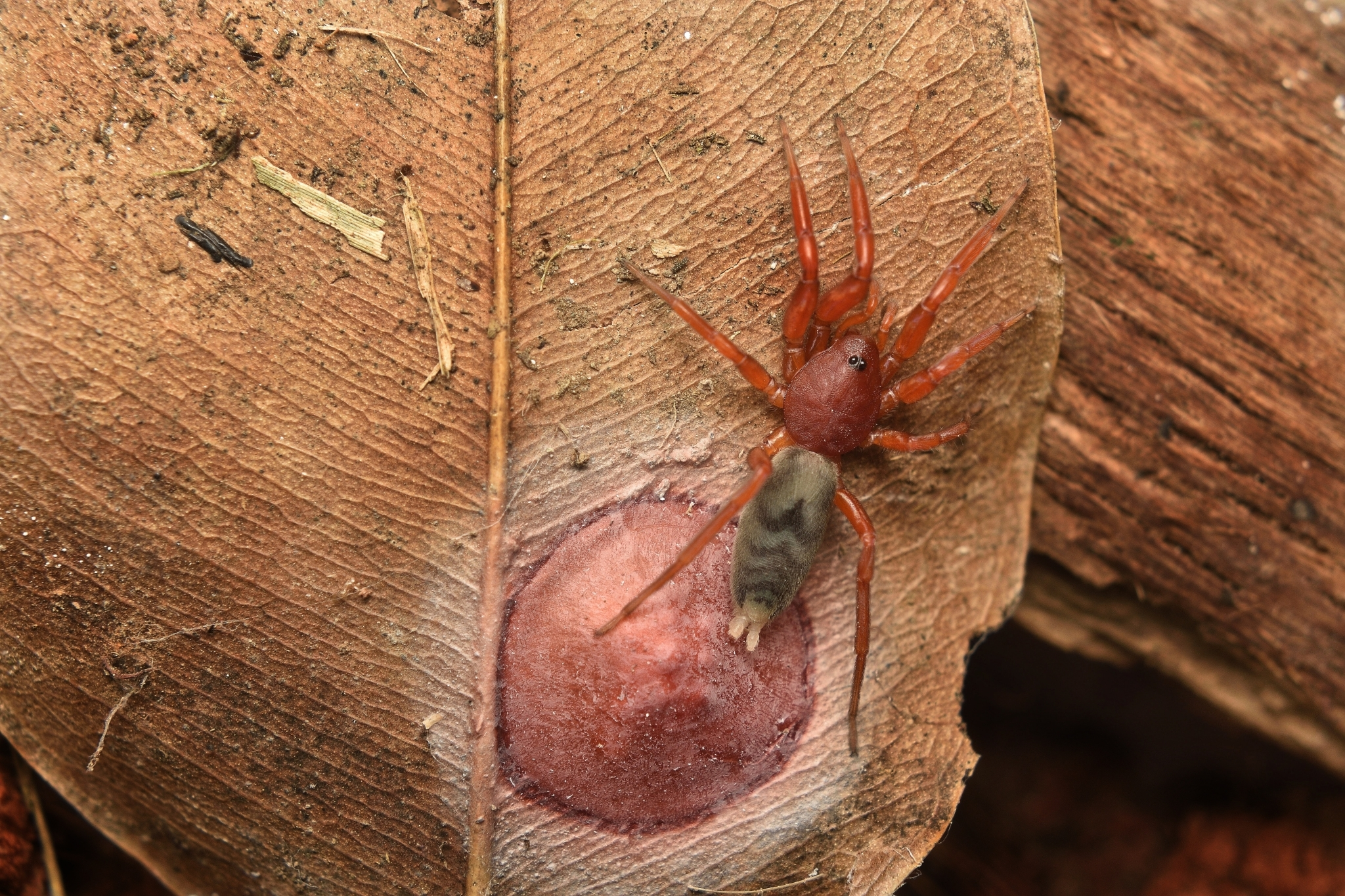
- Nops variabilis with egg sac, Colombia

Scientific classification
- Kingdom: Animalia
- Phylum: Arthropoda
- Subphylum: Chelicerata
- Class: Arachnida
- Order: Araneae
- Infraorder: Araneomorphae
- Family: Caponiidae
- Genus: Nops authority = MacLeay, 1839

Type species
- N. guanabacoae MacLeay, 1839

Species
- 38, see text

= Nops (spider) =

Nops Temporal range: Neogene–present

Genus of spiders

Nops is a genus of medium-sized South American, Central American, and Caribbean spiders in the family Caponiidae, first described by Alexander Macleay in 1839. It has a great richness on the Caribbean islands, and most mainland species are located in high proportion toward the Caribbean coast. It likely has a neotropical distribution, though most species of South America are known only from the coast of Colombia and Venezuela, including the islands of Aruba, Curaçao, Bonaire, and Trinidad.

== Monophyly ==
Nops have subsegmented tarsi, as well as two other leg characters often found in nopine genera: a ventral translucent keel on the anterior metatarsi and a translucent membrane between the anterior metatarsi and tarsi. These spiders can be distinguished from similar genera with these modifications by their elongated unpaired claw on the anterior legs, extending dorsally between the paired claws.

== Species ==
As of April 2019 it contains thirty-eight species plus one fossil in Dominican amber:

- Nops agnarssoni Sánchez-Ruiz, Brescovit & Alayón, 2015 – Puerto Rico
- Nops alexenriquei Sánchez-Ruiz & Brescovit, 2018 – Brazil
- Nops amazonas Sánchez-Ruiz & Brescovit, 2018 – Brazil
- Nops anisitsi Strand, 1909 – Paraguay
- Nops bahia Sánchez-Ruiz & Brescovit, 2018 – Brazil
- Nops bellulus Chamberlin, 1916 – Peru
- Nops blandus (Bryant, 1942) – Virgin Is. (US and UK)
- Nops branicki (Taczanowski, 1874) – French Guiana
- Nops campeche Sánchez-Ruiz & Brescovit, 2018 – Mexico, Belize, Costa Rica
- Nops coccineus Simon, 1892 – Saint Vincent and the Grenadines (St. Vincent)
- Nops enae Sánchez-Ruiz, 2004 – Cuba
- Nops ernestoi Sánchez-Ruiz, 2005 – Hispaniola (Dominican Rep.)
- Nops farhati Prosen, 1949 – Argentina
- Nops finisfurvus Sánchez-Ruiz, Brescovit & Alayón, 2015 – Virgin Is. (UK), Puerto Rico (Culebra Is.)
- Nops flutillus Chickering, 1967 – Curaçao
- Nops gertschi Chickering, 1967 – Hispaniola (Dominican Rep.)
- Nops glaucus Hasselt, 1887 – Netherlands Antilles (Bonaire)
- Nops guanabacoae MacLeay, 1839 (type) – Cuba, Bahamas
- Nops hispaniola Sánchez-Ruiz, Brescovit & Alayón, 2015 – Hispaniola (Haiti, Dominican Rep.)
- Nops ipojuca Sánchez-Ruiz & Brescovit, 2018 – Brazil
- Nops itapetinga Sánchez-Ruiz & Brescovit, 2018 – Brazil
- Nops jaragua Sánchez-Ruiz & Brescovit, 2018 – Dominican Rep.
- Nops largus Chickering, 1967 – Panama
- Nops maculatus Simon, 1893 – Venezuela, Trinidad, Guyana
- Nops mathani Simon, 1893 – Brazil
- Nops meridionalis Keyserling, 1891 – Brazil
- Nops minas Sánchez-Ruiz & Brescovit, 2018 – Brazil
- Nops navassa Sánchez-Ruiz & Brescovit, 2018 – Navassa Is. (Haiti or USA)
- Nops nitidus Simon, 1907 – Brazil
- Nops pallidus Sánchez-Ruiz & Brescovit, 2018 – Cuba
- Nops pocone Sánchez-Ruiz & Brescovit, 2018 – Brazil
- Nops quito Dupérré, 2014 – Ecuador
- Nops siboney Sánchez-Ruiz, 2004 – Cuba
- Nops sublaevis Simon, 1893 – Venezuela
- Nops tico Sánchez-Ruiz & Brescovit, 2018 – Costa Rica, Panama
- Nops toballus Chickering, 1967 – Jamaica
- Nops ursumus Chickering, 1967 – Panama
- Nops variabilis Keyserling, 1877 – Colombia, Venezuela

== Image gallery ==
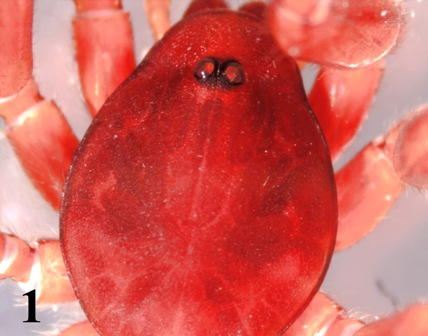
Nops craneae carapace; Chickering

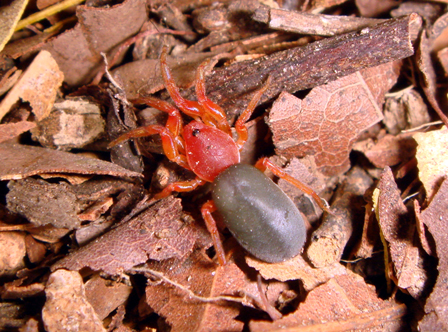
Nops enae; Sánchez-Ruiz

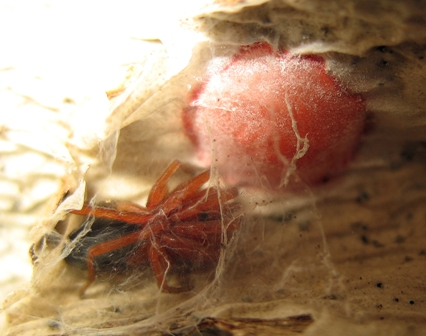
Nops guanabacoae female with egg sac, MacLeay

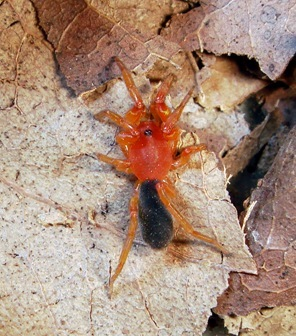
Nops guanabacoae male; MacLeay

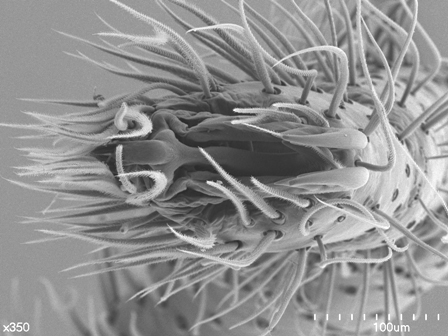
Nops guanabacoae claws on leg I; MacLeay

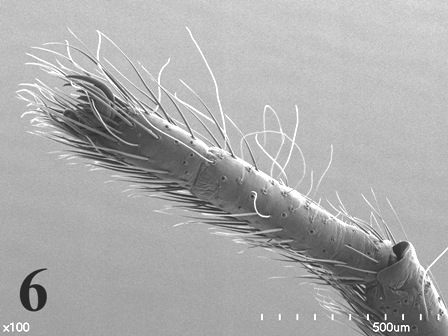
Nops guanabacoae tarsi of leg I; MacLeay

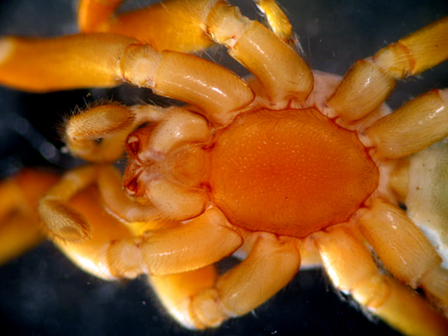
Nops siboney ventral view; Sánchez-Ruiz
