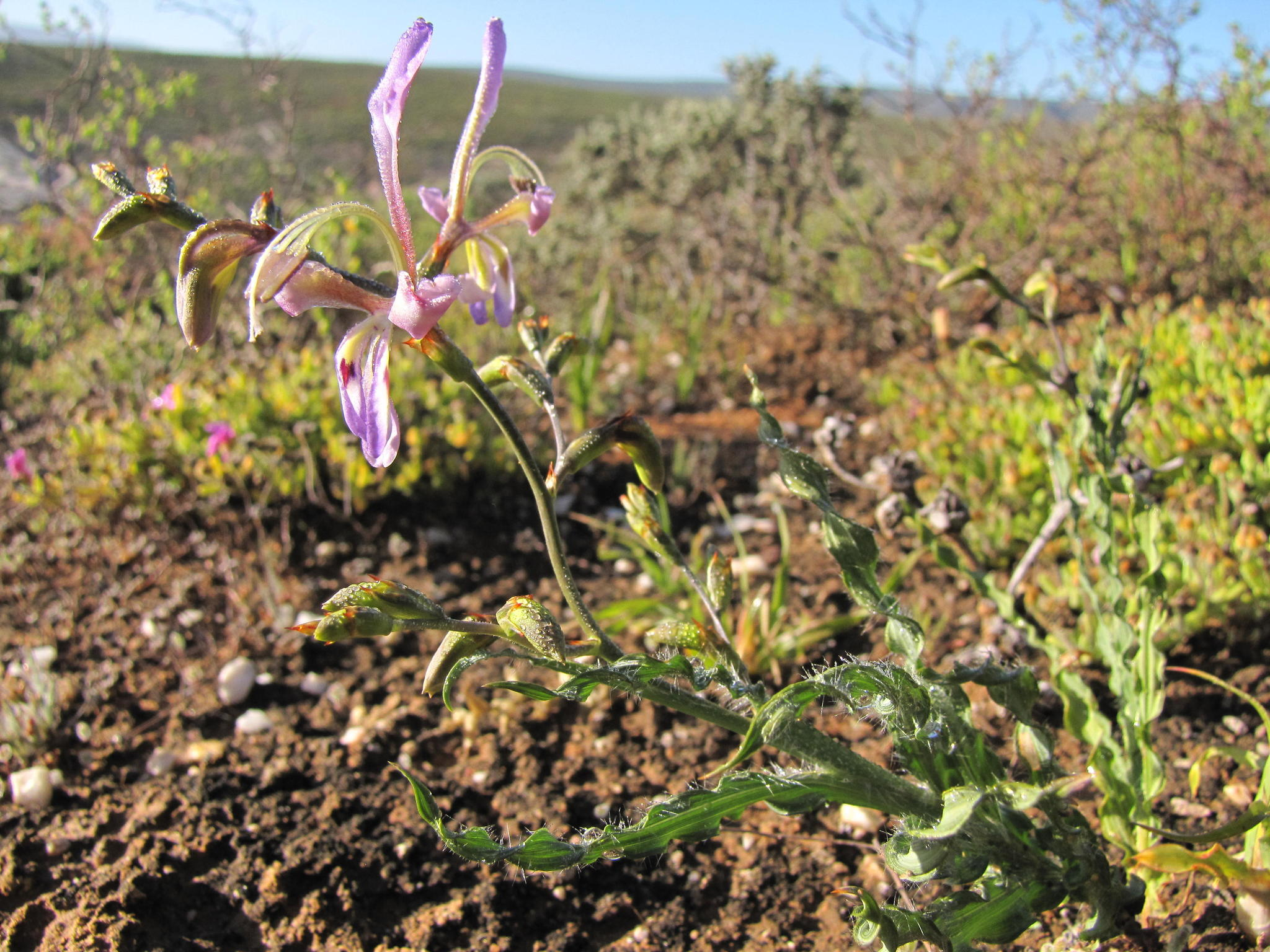

Conservation status
- Least Concern (IUCN 3.1)

Scientific classification
- Kingdom: Plantae
- Clade: Tracheophytes
- Clade: Angiosperms
- Clade: Monocots
- Order: Asparagales
- Family: Iridaceae
- Genus: Babiana
- Species: B. sinuata

Binomial name
- Babiana sinuata G.J.Lewis

= Babiana sinuata =

Species of flowering plant

Babiana sinuata is a perennial flowering plant and geophyte belonging to the genus Babiana. The species is endemic to the Northern Cape and the Western Cape and occurs from Kamieskroon to Clanwilliam. It is part of the fynbos and succulent Karoo vegetation.
