= Zelotes flavitarsis =

Scientific classification
- Kingdom: Animalia
- Phylum: Arthropoda
- Subphylum: Chelicerata
- Class: Arachnida
- Order: Araneae
- Infraorder: Araneomorphae
- Family: Gnaphosidae
- Genus: Zelotes
- Species: Z. flavitarsis

Binomial name
- Zelotes flavitarsis (Purcell, 1908)

Synonyms
- Melanophora flavitarsis Purcell, 1908

Species of spider

Zelotes flavitarsis is a species of spider in the family Gnaphosidae. It is commonly known as the Kamaggas dark ground spider.

== Distribution ==
Zelotes flavitarsis is endemic to the Northern Cape of South Africa. It has been recorded from Kamaggas (the type locality) and Namaqua National Park, at altitudes ranging from 230 to 420 m above sea level.

== Habitat and ecology ==
The species inhabits the Succulent Karoo biome. These are flat-bellied ground spiders that are nocturnal hunters. They make silk sacs under stones and surface debris where they live during the day, while moulting, and during prolonged periods of inactivity.

== Conservation ==
Zelotes flavitarsis is listed as Data Deficient for taxonomic reasons. Placement of the male is problematic and too little is known about the location, range and threats of this taxon for an assessment to be made. There are no significant threats to the species. More sampling is needed to collect the male and determine the species' range.

== Taxonomy ==
The species was originally described by Purcell in 1908 from Kamaggas as Melanophora flavitarsis. It was revised by FitzPatrick in 2007. The species is known only from the female.
