= Caponia spiralifera =

Hanover Orange Lungless Spider

Conservation status
- Least Concern (SANBI Red List)

Scientific classification
- Kingdom: Animalia
- Phylum: Arthropoda
- Subphylum: Chelicerata
- Class: Arachnida
- Order: Araneae
- Infraorder: Araneomorphae
- Family: Caponiidae
- Genus: Caponia
- Species: C. spiralifera

Binomial name
- Caponia spiralifera Purcell, 1904

Species of spider

Caponia spiralifera is a species of spider of the genus Caponia. It is endemic to South Africa.

== Distribution ==
Caponia spiralifera has a wide distribution across five provinces in South Africa: the Eastern Cape, Gauteng, Mpumalanga, North West, and Northern Cape. The species is protected in several areas including Klipriviersberg Nature Reserve, Richtersveld Transfrontier National Park, and Namaqua National Park.

== Habitat ==
The species is a free-living ground dweller sampled from multiple biomes including Forest, Desert, Grassland, Nama Karoo, Savanna and Thicket biomes.

== Conservation ==
Caponia spiralifera is listed as Least Concern due to its wide geographical range. The species is found at elevations ranging from 56 to 1,730 metres above sea level.

The species is protected in Klipriviersberg Nature Reserve, Bergvliet Forest Station, Richtersveld Transfrontier National Park, Namaqua National Park, and Groenkloof Nature Reserve.

== Description ==
Both males and females are known for this species.
