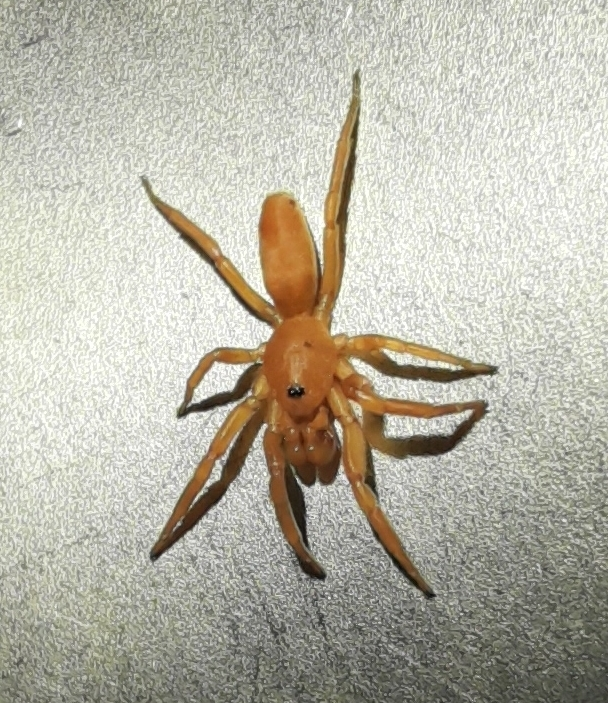
- male

Scientific classification
- Kingdom: Animalia
- Phylum: Arthropoda
- Subphylum: Chelicerata
- Class: Arachnida
- Order: Araneae
- Infraorder: Araneomorphae
- Family: Caponiidae
- Genus: Caponia
- Species: C. chelifera

Binomial name
- Caponia chelifera Lessert, 1936

= Caponia chelifera =

Mozambique Orange Lungless Spider

Species of spider

Caponia chelifera is a species of spider of the genus Caponia. It is found in Mozambique, Zimbabwe, and South Africa.

== Distribution ==
Caponia chelifera has been recorded from four provinces in South Africa: Gauteng, KwaZulu-Natal, Limpopo, and Mpumalanga. The species is found in protected areas including Ndumo Game Reserve, iSimangaliso Wetland Park, Blouberg Nature Reserve, and Kruger National Park.

== Habitat ==
The species is a free-living ground dweller and wandering spider typically found on the ground surface. These spiders are active at night and are swift runners that pursue their prey over the ground. They usually rest during the day in small oval retreats built of transparent silk, stones and ground debris constructed under rocks, soil debris or in grass tussocks. The species has been recorded from the Grassland, Forest and Savanna biomes.

== Conservation ==
Caponia chelifera is listed as Least Concern due to its wide geographic range. The species is found at elevations ranging from 70 to 1,415 metres above sea level.

The species is protected in nine protected areas including Ndumo Game Reserve, Blouberg Nature Reserve, Polokwane Nature Reserve, and Legalameetse Nature Reserve.
