= Caponia karrooica =

Karroo Orange Lungless Spider

Scientific classification
- Kingdom: Animalia
- Phylum: Arthropoda
- Subphylum: Chelicerata
- Class: Arachnida
- Order: Araneae
- Infraorder: Araneomorphae
- Family: Caponiidae
- Genus: Caponia
- Species: C. karrooica

Binomial name
- Caponia karrooica Purcell, 1904

Species of spider

Caponia karrooica is a species of spider of the genus Caponia. It is endemic to South Africa.

== Distribution ==
Caponia karrooica has been recorded from the Eastern Cape and Western Cape provinces of South Africa. The species is known from Matjiesfontein, Willowmore, Worcester, and Campherskloof.

== Habitat ==
The species is a free-living ground dweller sampled from the Nama Karoo biome.

== Conservation ==
Caponia karrooica is listed as Data Deficient for taxonomic reasons. The species is found at elevations ranging from 850 to 912 metres above sea level. The species is known from Matjiesfontein and Willowmore where it was recorded prior to 1904, with a more recent collection from Campherskloof. It is likely under-collected and the status remains obscure. More sampling is needed to collect females and determine the species range.

== Description ==
Only males are currently known for this species.
