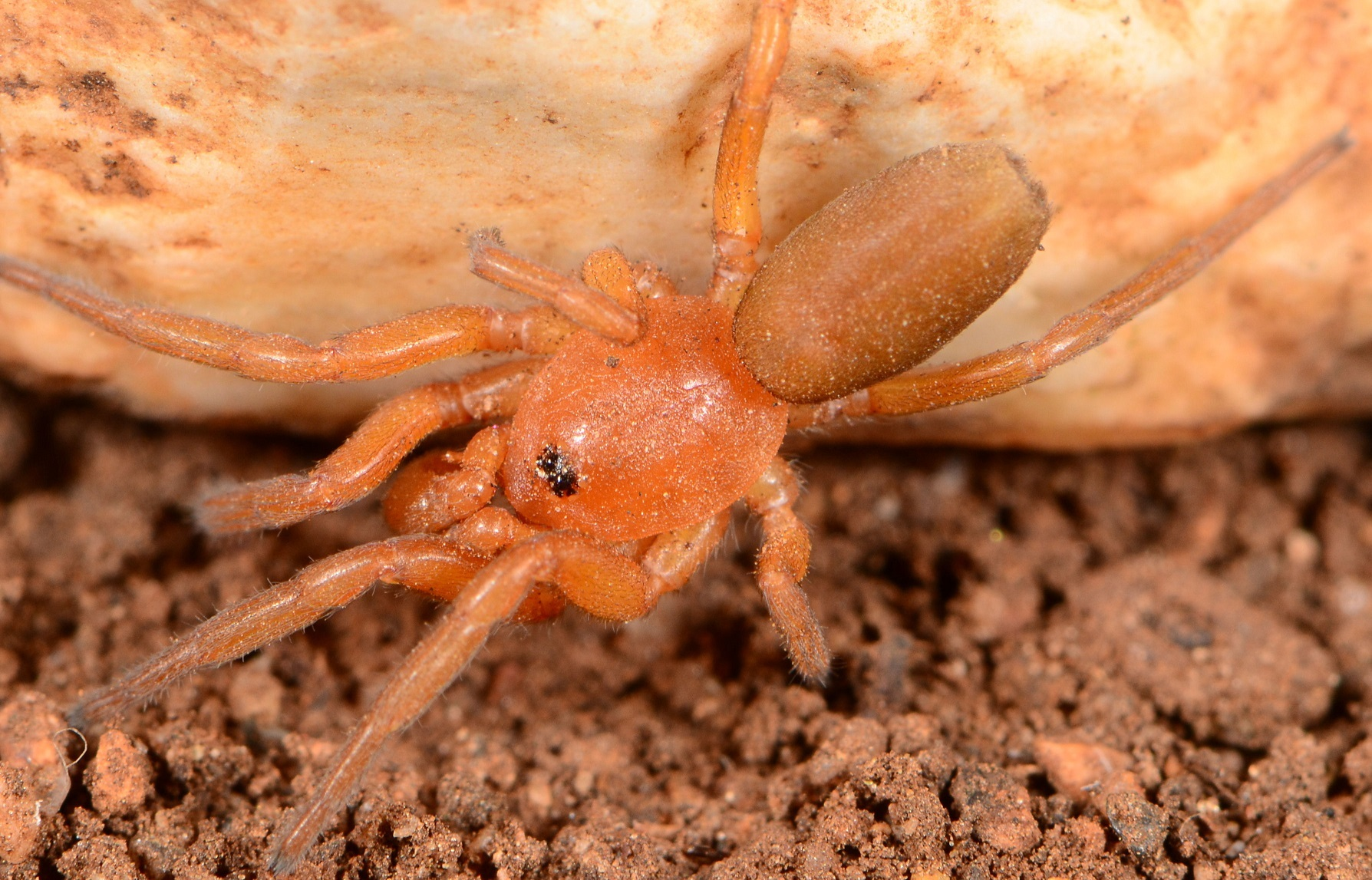
- An approximation of what this animal would look like. The animal in the photo is caponia hastifera. An animal in the same genus

Scientific classification
- Kingdom: Animalia
- Phylum: Arthropoda
- Subphylum: Chelicerata
- Class: Arachnida
- Order: Araneae
- Infraorder: Araneomorphae
- Family: Caponiidae
- Genus: Caponia
- Species: C. simoni

Binomial name
- Caponia simoni Purcell, 1904

= Caponia simoni =

Simon's Orange Lungless Spider

Species of spider

Caponia simoni is a species of spider of the genus Caponia. It is endemic to the Western Cape province of South Africa.

== Etymology ==
The species is named in honour of Eugène Simon, the prominent French arachnologist who established the genus Caponia.

== Distribution ==
Caponia simoni is known only from the type locality of Worcester in the Western Cape, where it was collected in 1896.

== Habitat ==
The species is a free-living ground dweller sampled from the Fynbos Biome.

== Conservation ==
Caponia simoni is listed as Data Deficient for both data and taxonomic reasons. The species is found at an elevation of 428 metres above sea level. It is known only from the type locality Worcester, collected in 1896. Identification of the species is still problematic. More sampling is needed to determine the species range and a taxonomic revision is required.

== Description ==
Both males and females are known for this species.
