= Caponia secunda =

Thicket Orange Lungless Spider

Scientific classification
- Kingdom: Animalia
- Phylum: Arthropoda
- Subphylum: Chelicerata
- Class: Arachnida
- Order: Araneae
- Infraorder: Araneomorphae
- Family: Caponiidae
- Genus: Caponia
- Species: C. secunda

Binomial name
- Caponia secunda Pocock, 1900

Species of spider

Caponia secunda is a species of spider of the genus Caponia. It is endemic to South Africa.

== Distribution ==
Caponia secunda is known only from the type locality in the Grahamstown area of the Eastern Cape.

== Habitat ==
The species is a free-living ground dweller sampled from the Thicket Biome.

== Conservation ==
Caponia secunda is listed as Data Deficient for taxonomic reasons. The species is found at an elevation of 565 metres above sea level. There is not enough known about the habitat and range of this species for a full assessment to be conducted. The status remains obscure and more sampling is needed to collect males and determine the species range.

== Description ==
Only females are currently known for this species.
