= Caponia braunsi =

Braun's Orange Lungless Spider

Scientific classification
- Kingdom: Animalia
- Phylum: Arthropoda
- Subphylum: Chelicerata
- Class: Arachnida
- Order: Araneae
- Infraorder: Araneomorphae
- Family: Caponiidae
- Genus: Caponia
- Species: C. braunsi

Binomial name
- Caponia braunsi Purcell, 1904

Species of spider

Caponia braunsi is a species of spider of the genus Caponia. It is endemic to South Africa. They are also referred to as Braun's Orange Lungless Spider.

== Distribution ==
Caponia braunsi has been recorded from the Eastern Cape and Western Cape provinces of South Africa. The species is known from localities including Alicedale, Willowmore, and Addo Elephant National Park in the Eastern Cape, and the Swartberg Nature Reserve, Witteberg Nature Reserve, and Laingsburg in the Western Cape.

== Behaviour ==
Caponia braunsi are a mostly ground-dwelling species of eight-eyed orange lungless spider. They are nocturnal pursuit hunters who spend their days in small silk lined burrows.

== Conservation ==
Very little is known about Caponia Braunsi due to limited specimens, all of which are male. As of 2020, they were listed as Data Deficient, due to an inability to properly describe the species.

The species is protected in Addo Elephant National Park, Swartberg Nature Reserve, and Witteberg Nature Reserve.
