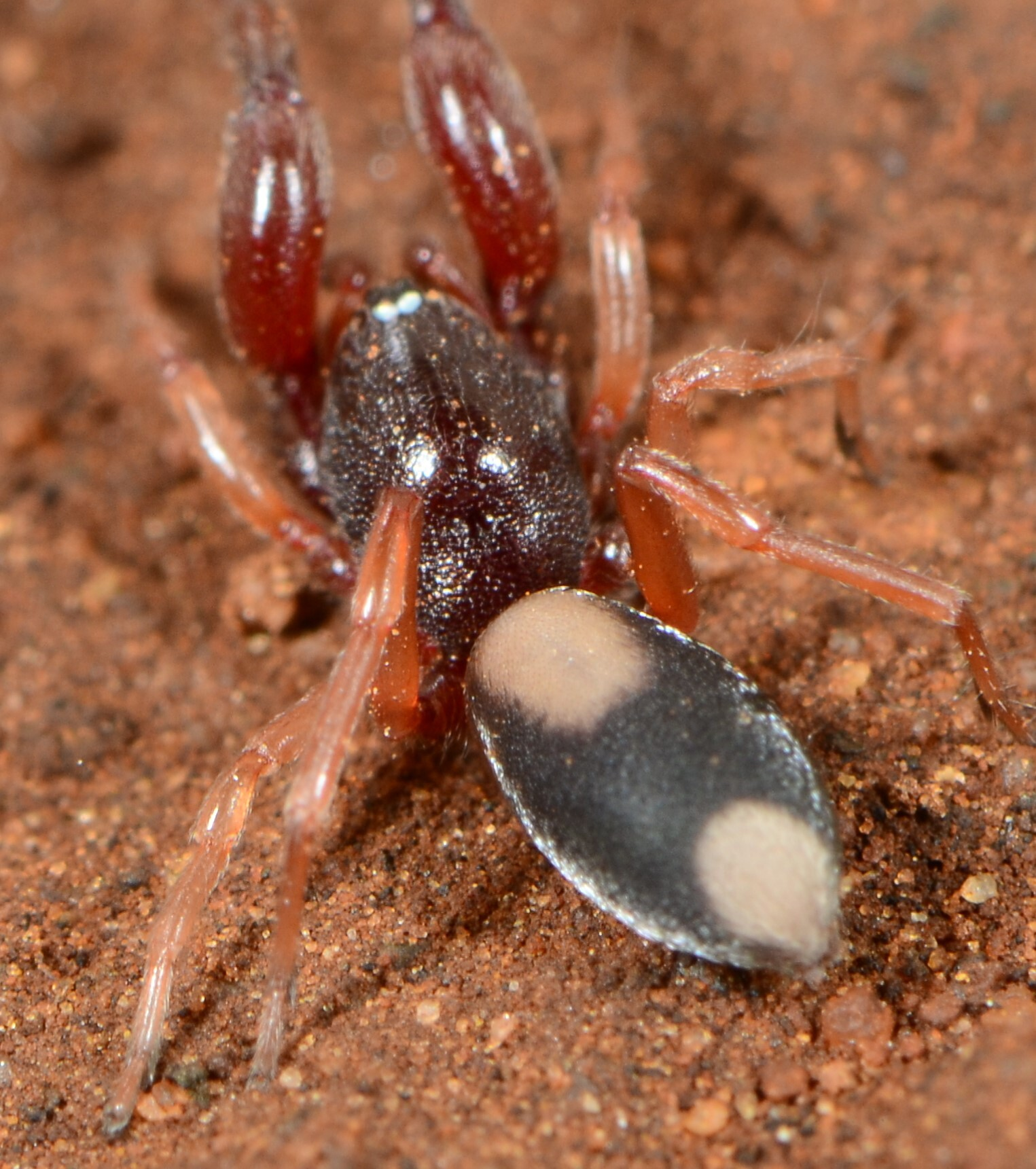
- Adult female
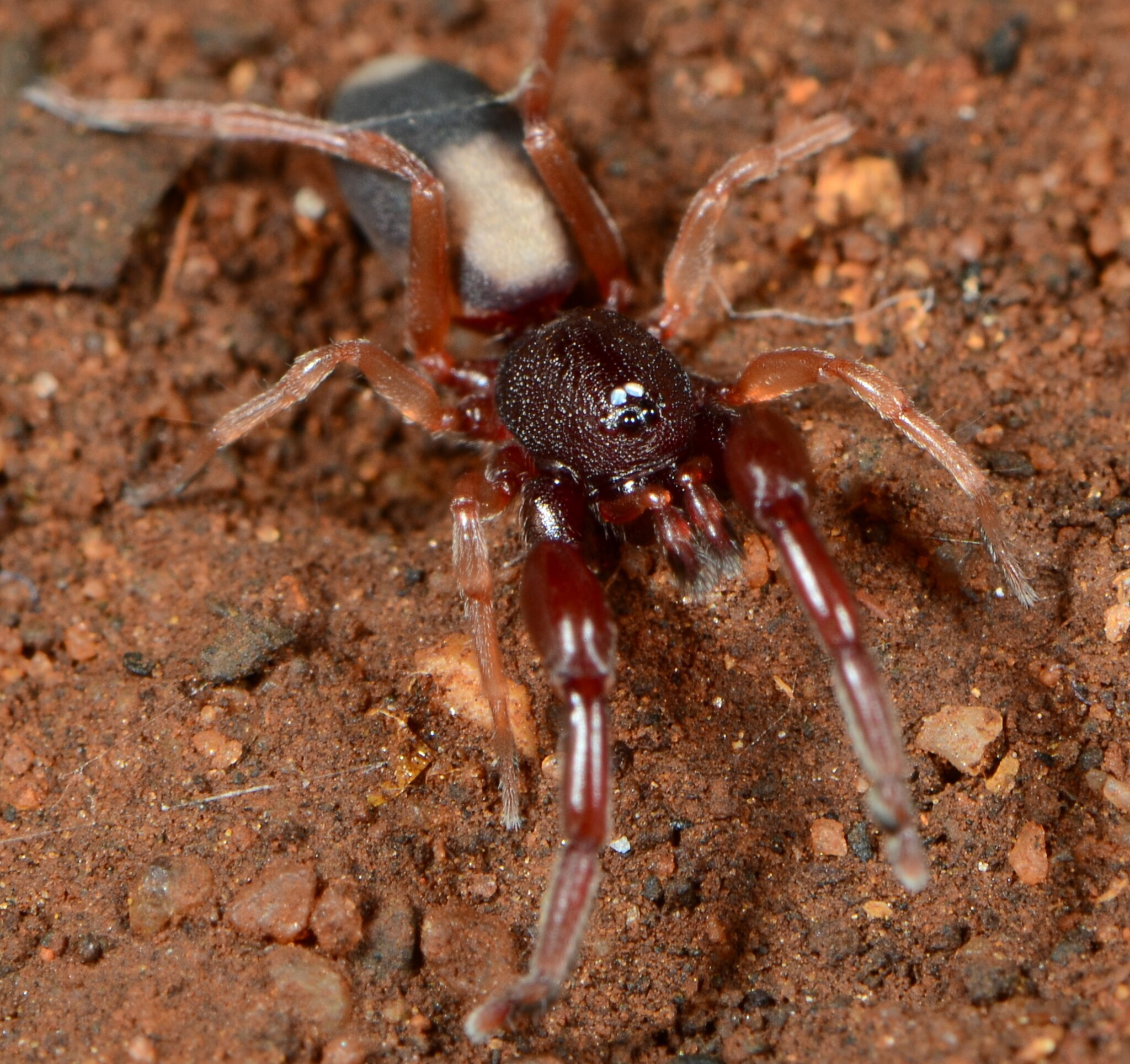

Scientific classification
- Kingdom: Animalia
- Phylum: Arthropoda
- Subphylum: Chelicerata
- Class: Arachnida
- Order: Araneae
- Infraorder: Araneomorphae
- Family: Palpimanidae
- Genus: Diaphorocellus
- Species: D. biplagiatus

Binomial name
- Diaphorocellus biplagiatus Simon, 1893

= Diaphorocellus biplagiatus =

Two-Spotted Palpimanid Spider

Species of spider

Diaphorocellus biplagiatus is a species of spider in the family Palpimanidae. It is endemic to southern Africa and is commonly known as the two-spotted palpimanid spider.

== Distribution ==
Diaphorocellus biplagiatus has a wide distribution across Botswana, Namibia and South Africa. In South Africa, the species occurs in the Northern Cape and Western Cape provinces. Notable locations include the Cederberg Wilderness Area, Karoo National Park, and Table Mountain National Park.

== Habitat and ecology ==
The species is a free-running ground dweller frequently sampled from pitfall traps. It inhabits multiple biomes including Fynbos, Grassland, Desert, Nama Karoo, Savanna and Succulent Karoo biomes. It has also been sampled from pistachio orchards. Altitudes range from sea level to 1680 m above sea level.

== Conservation ==
Diaphorocellus biplagiatus is listed as Least Concern by the South African National Biodiversity Institute due to its wide geographical range. There are no significant threats to the species.

== Taxonomy ==
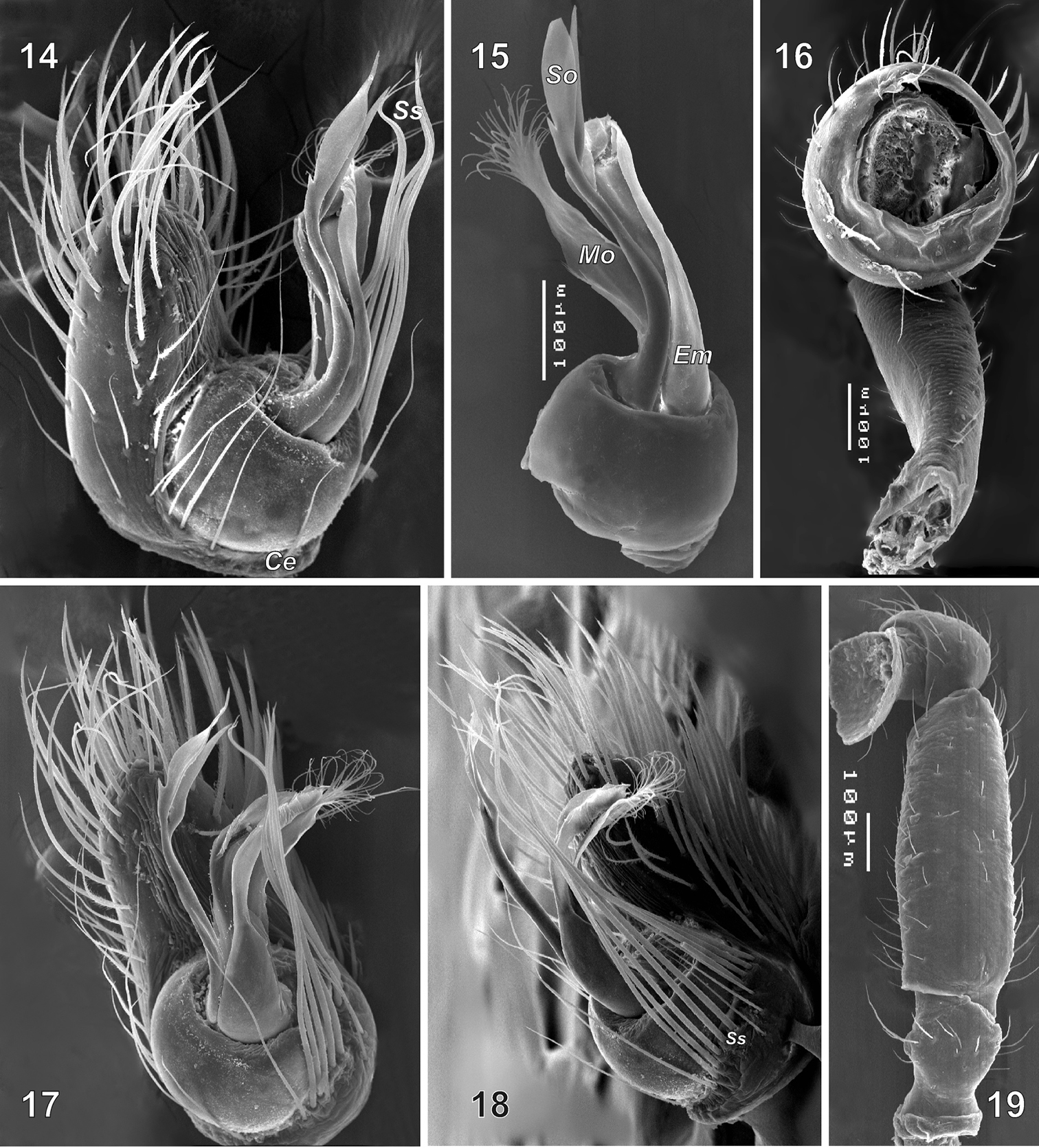
Palp

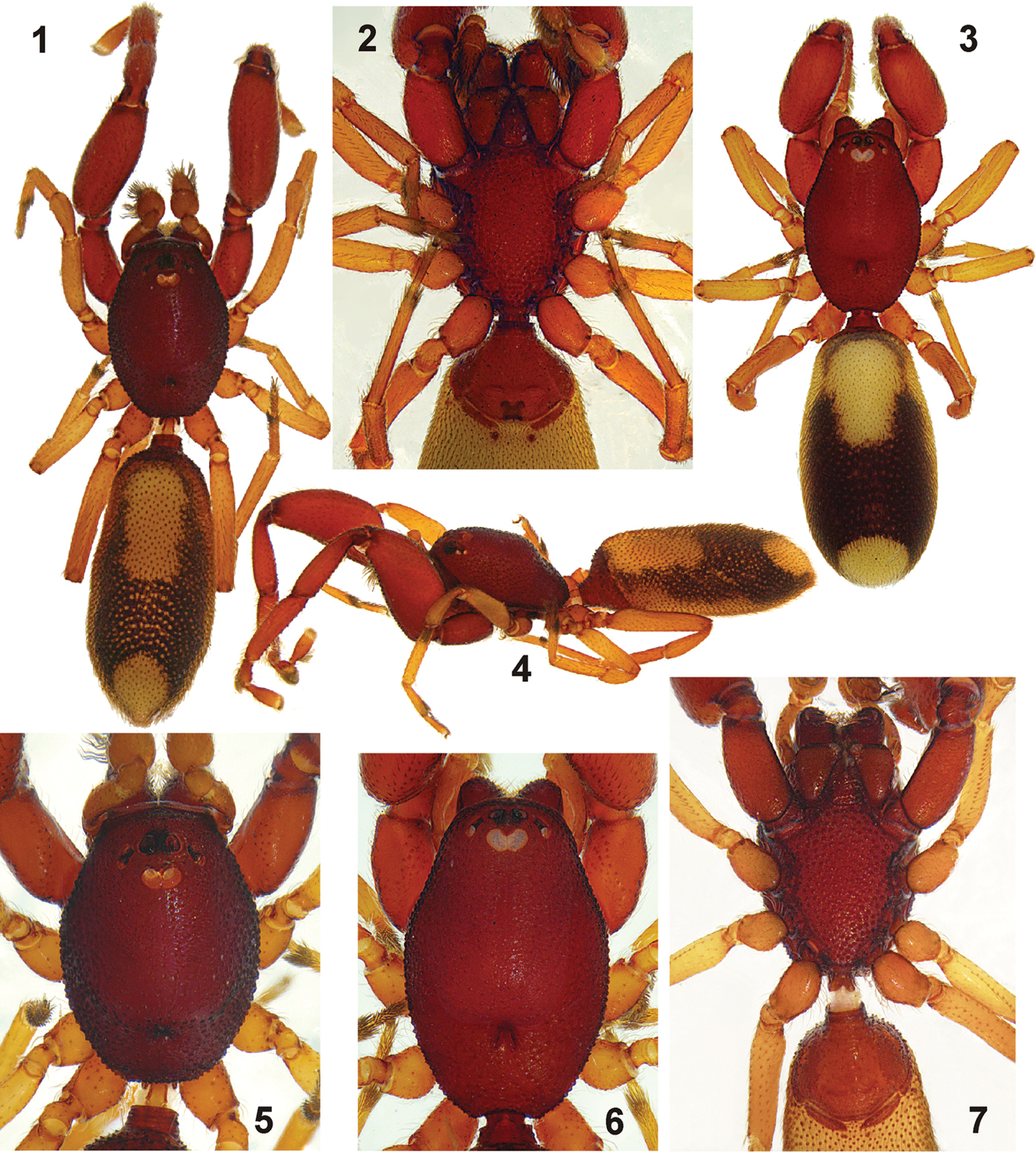
Body details

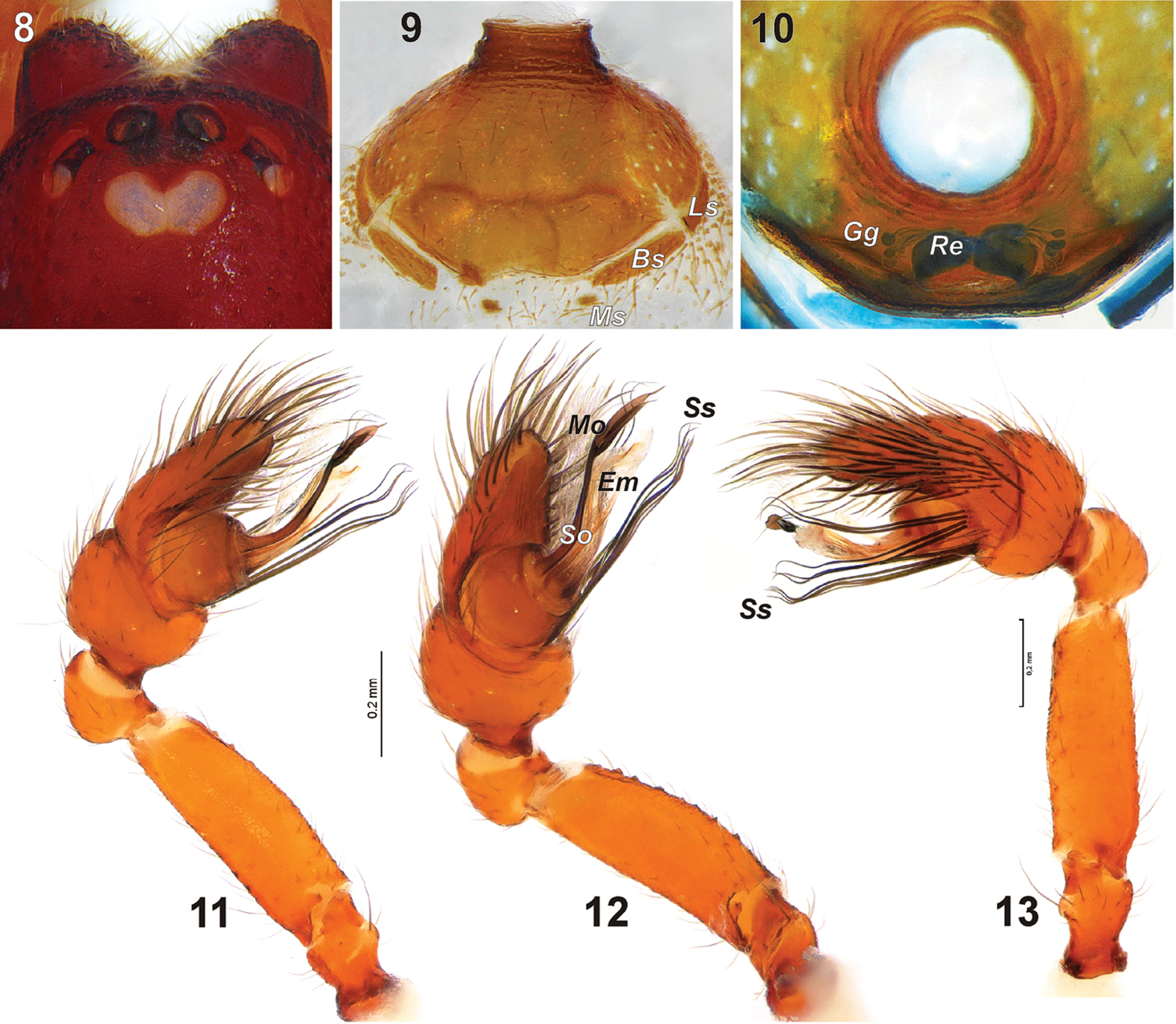
Anatomical details

The species was originally described by Eugène Simon in 1893 from "Africa australis". It was redescribed by Zonstein et al. in 2016, who studied numerous specimens from South Africa and adjacent countries. Although specimens have the same abdominal pattern and size, they determined that the genitalia of specimens from the Western Cape clearly differ from specimens from Botswana and the eastern provinces of South Africa. Zonstein et al. considered only specimens from the Western and Northern Cape provinces as belonging to D. biplagiatus.
