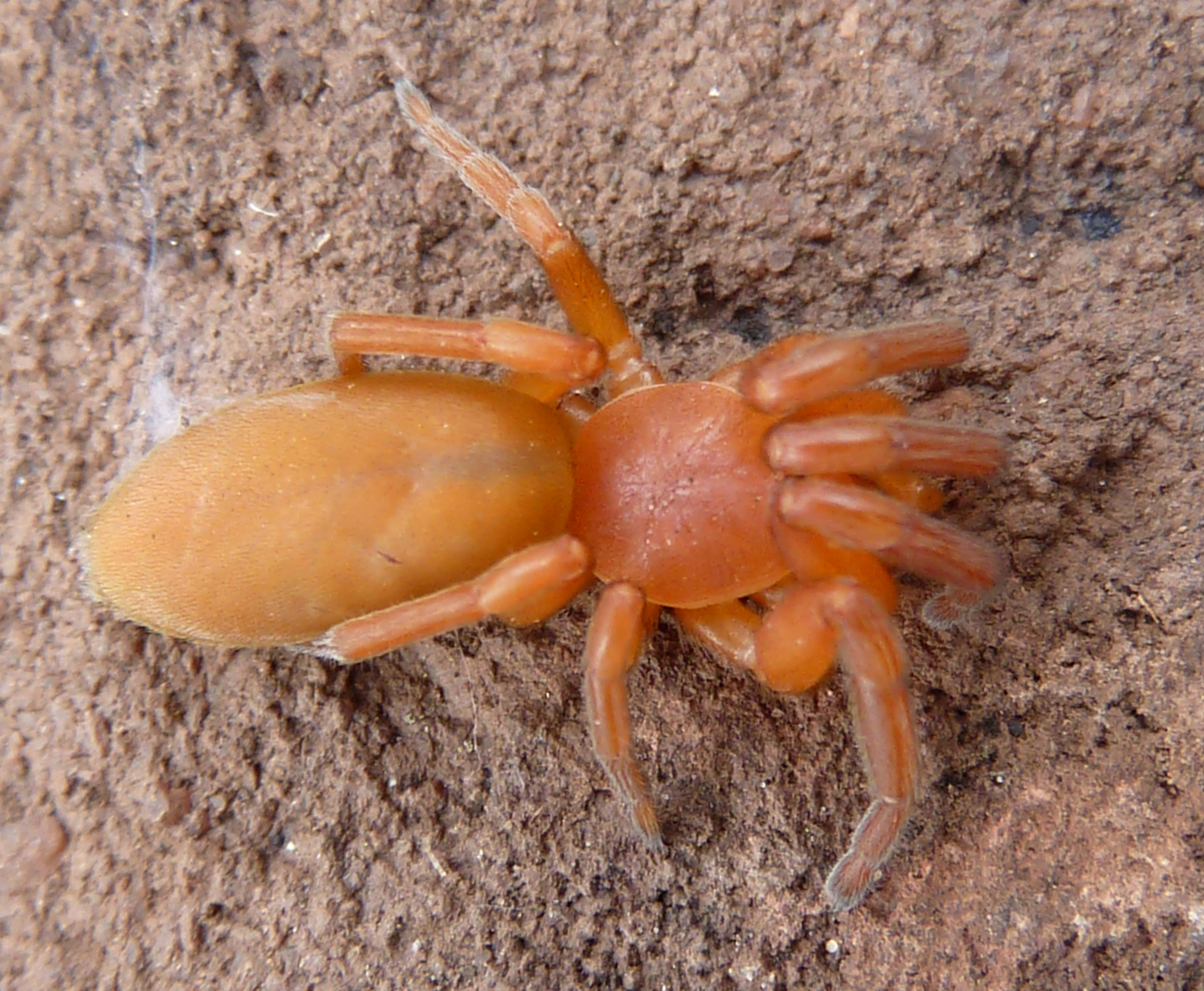
- Caponia sp. from Little Eden
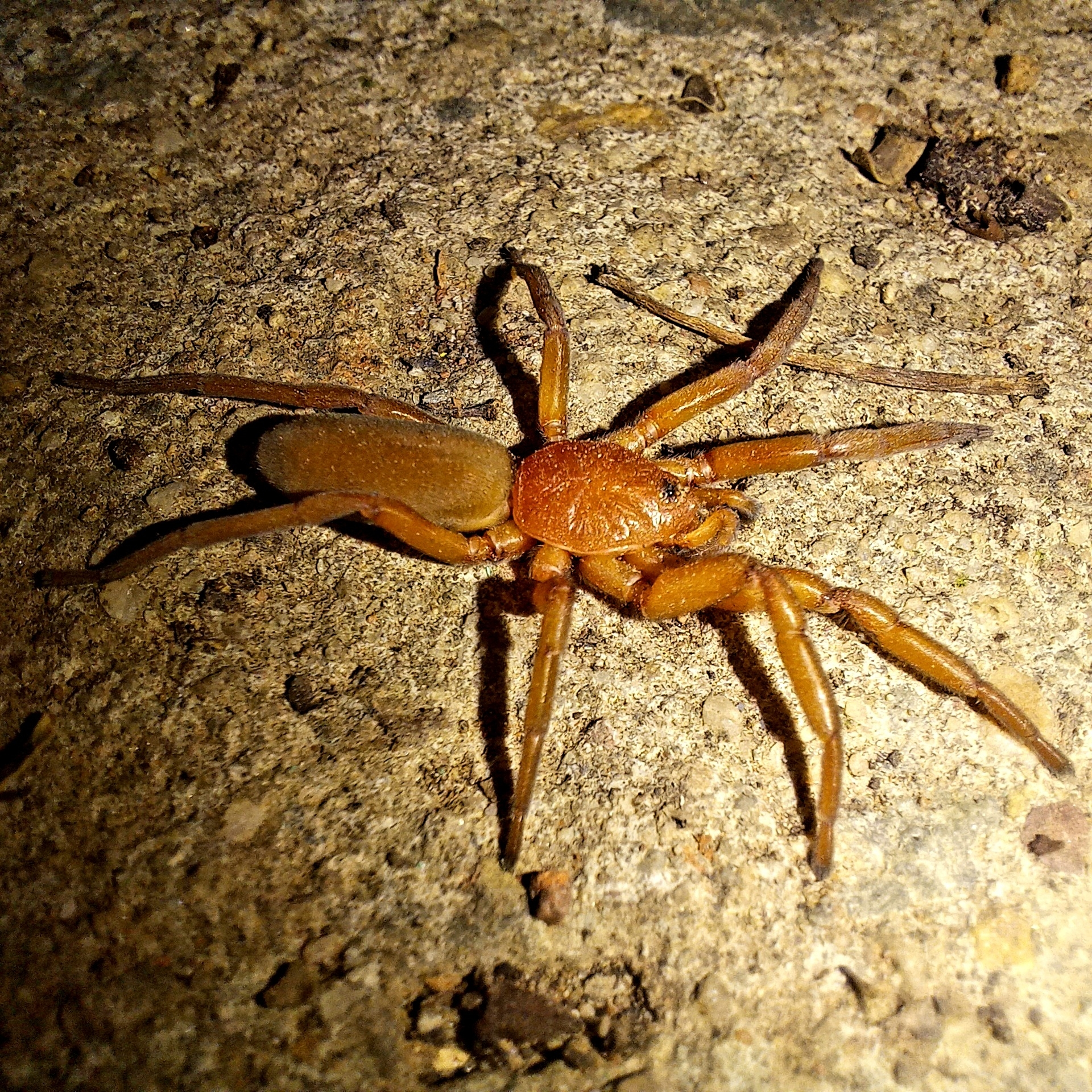
- C. capensis

Scientific classification
- Kingdom: Animalia
- Phylum: Arthropoda
- Subphylum: Chelicerata
- Class: Arachnida
- Order: Araneae
- Infraorder: Araneomorphae
- Family: Caponiidae
- Genus: Caponia; Simon, 1887

Type species
- C. natalensis (O. Pickard-Cambridge, 1874)

Species
- 10, see text

= Caponia =

Genus of spiders

Caponia, also called eight-eyed orange lungless spiders, is an Afrotropical genus of araneomorph spiders in the family Caponiidae, first described by Eugène Simon in 1887.

As the common name implies, these spiders have a tightly arranged set of eight eyes, as opposed to the related two-eyed genus Diploglena, and breathe using two pairs of tracheae rather than book lungs. They are agile, nocturnal hunters, that hide by day in a variety of silk-lined retreats.

== Species ==
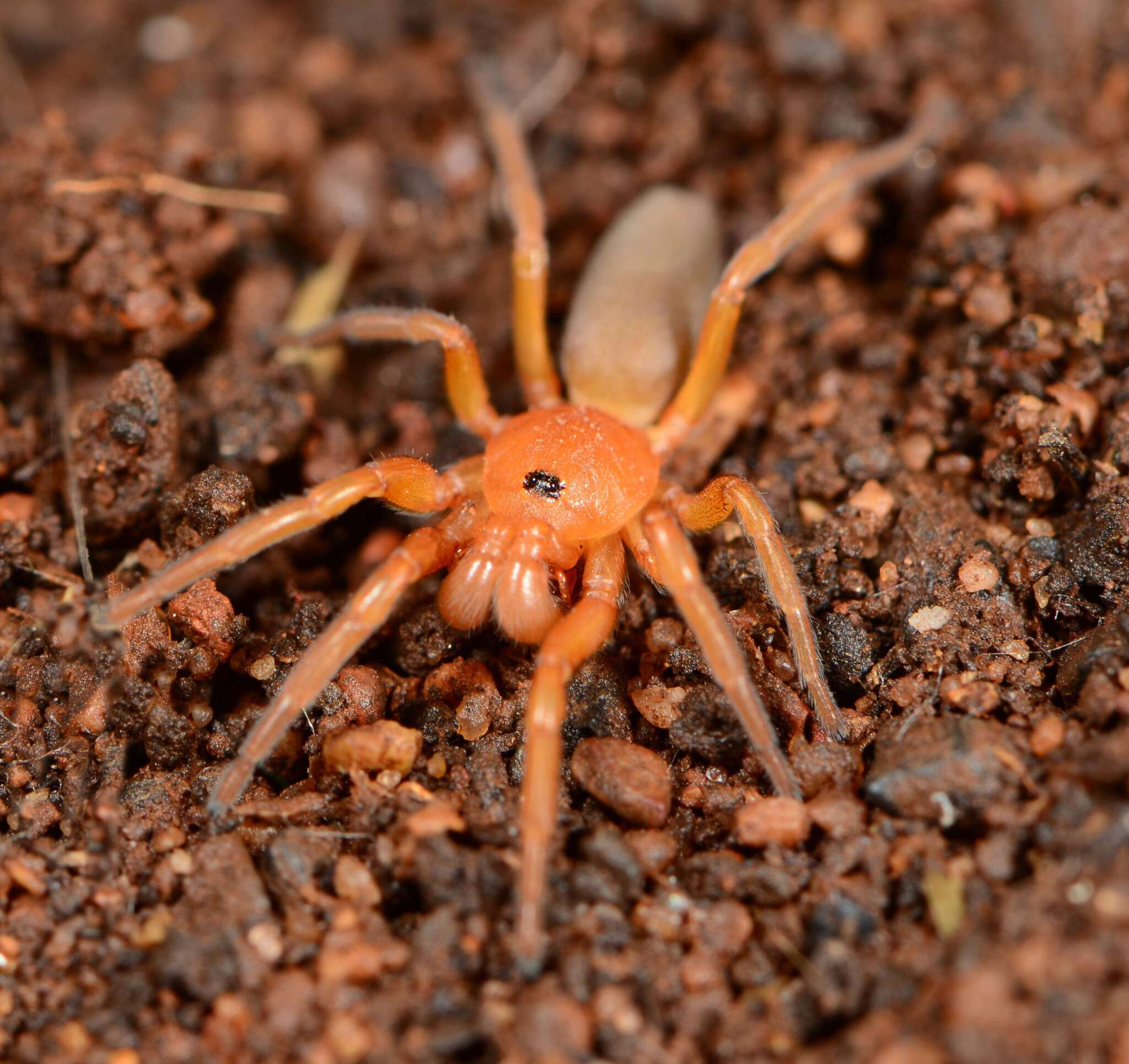
male C. hastifera

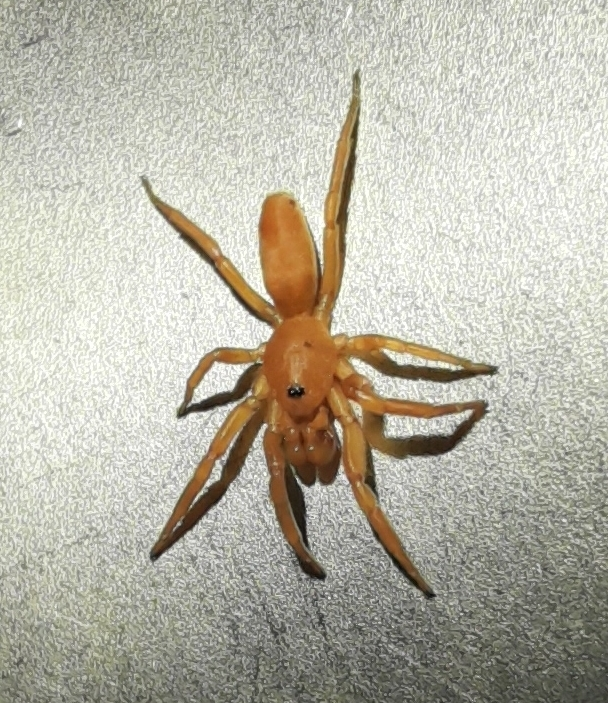
C. chelifera

As of September 2025 it contains ten species:

- Caponia braunsi Purcell, 1904 – South Africa
- Caponia capensis Purcell, 1904 – South Africa, Mozambique
- Caponia chelifera Lessert, 1936 – Mozambique
- Caponia forficifera Purcell, 1904 – South Africa
- Caponia hastifera Purcell, 1904 – South Africa, Mozambique
- Caponia karrooica Purcell, 1904 – South Africa
- Caponia natalensis (O. Pickard-Cambridge, 1874) (type) – Tanzania, Mozambique, South Africa
- Caponia secunda Pocock, 1900 – South Africa
- Caponia simoni Purcell, 1904 – South Africa
- Caponia spiralifera Purcell, 1904 – South Africa
