= Caponia forficifera =

Forest Orange Lungless Spider

Scientific classification
- Kingdom: Animalia
- Phylum: Arthropoda
- Subphylum: Chelicerata
- Class: Arachnida
- Order: Araneae
- Infraorder: Araneomorphae
- Family: Caponiidae
- Genus: Caponia
- Species: C. forficifera

Binomial name
- Caponia forficifera Purcell, 1904

Species of spider

Caponia forficifera is a species of spider of the genus Caponia. It is endemic to the Western Cape province of South Africa.

== Distribution ==
Caponia forficifera is known from three historical collections in the Western Cape: Knysna, Brandvlei near Worcester, and Swellendam. All specimens were collected between 1896 and 1900.

== Habitat ==
The species is a free-living ground dweller sampled from the Forest Biome. The specific habitat preferences for this species remain unknown due to the limited collection data.

== Conservation ==
Caponia forficifera is listed as Data Deficient for taxonomic reasons. The species is found at elevations ranging from 120 to 566 metres above sea level. The species is known from three old collections from Knysna (1896), Brandvlei near Worcester (1900), and Swellendam (around 1900). The status remains obscure and more sampling is needed to collect females and determine the species range.

The species is protected in the Knysna Forest.

== Description ==
Only males are currently known for this species.
