= Caponia natalensis =

Natal Orange Lungless Spider

Conservation status
- Least Concern (SANBI Red List)

Scientific classification
- Kingdom: Animalia
- Phylum: Arthropoda
- Subphylum: Chelicerata
- Class: Arachnida
- Order: Araneae
- Infraorder: Araneomorphae
- Family: Caponiidae
- Genus: Caponia
- Species: C. natalensis

Binomial name
- Caponia natalensis (O. Pickard-Cambridge, 1874)

Synonyms
- Colophon natalensis O. Pickard-Cambridge, 1874

Species of spider

Caponia natalensis is a species of spider of the genus Caponia and the type species of the genus. It is found in Tanzania, Namibia, Botswana, Mozambique, and South Africa.

== Taxonomy ==
The species was originally described as Colophon natalensis by Octavius Pickard-Cambridge in 1874, with the type locality given only as Natal. It was later transferred to the genus Caponia by Eugène Simon in 1887.

== Distribution ==
Caponia natalensis has been recorded from three provinces in South Africa: the Eastern Cape, KwaZulu-Natal, and Limpopo. The species is abundant in Kruger National Park and has also been recorded from Ndumo Game Reserve and iSimangaliso Wetland Park.

== Habitat ==
The species is a free-living ground dweller frequently sampled in pitfall traps from the Savanna Biome.

== Conservation ==
Caponia natalensis is listed as Least Concern. Specimens of both sexes have been identified and sampled from four African countries. In South Africa it is known from three provinces at elevations ranging from 83 to 389 metres above sea level. It is abundant in Kruger National Park with more than 20 records reported. There are no recorded threats to the species, and considering its broad geographical range in Africa it is listed as Least Concern.

The species is protected in Kruger National Park, iSimangaliso Wetland Park, and Ndumo Game Reserve.

== Description ==
Both sexes are known for this species.
