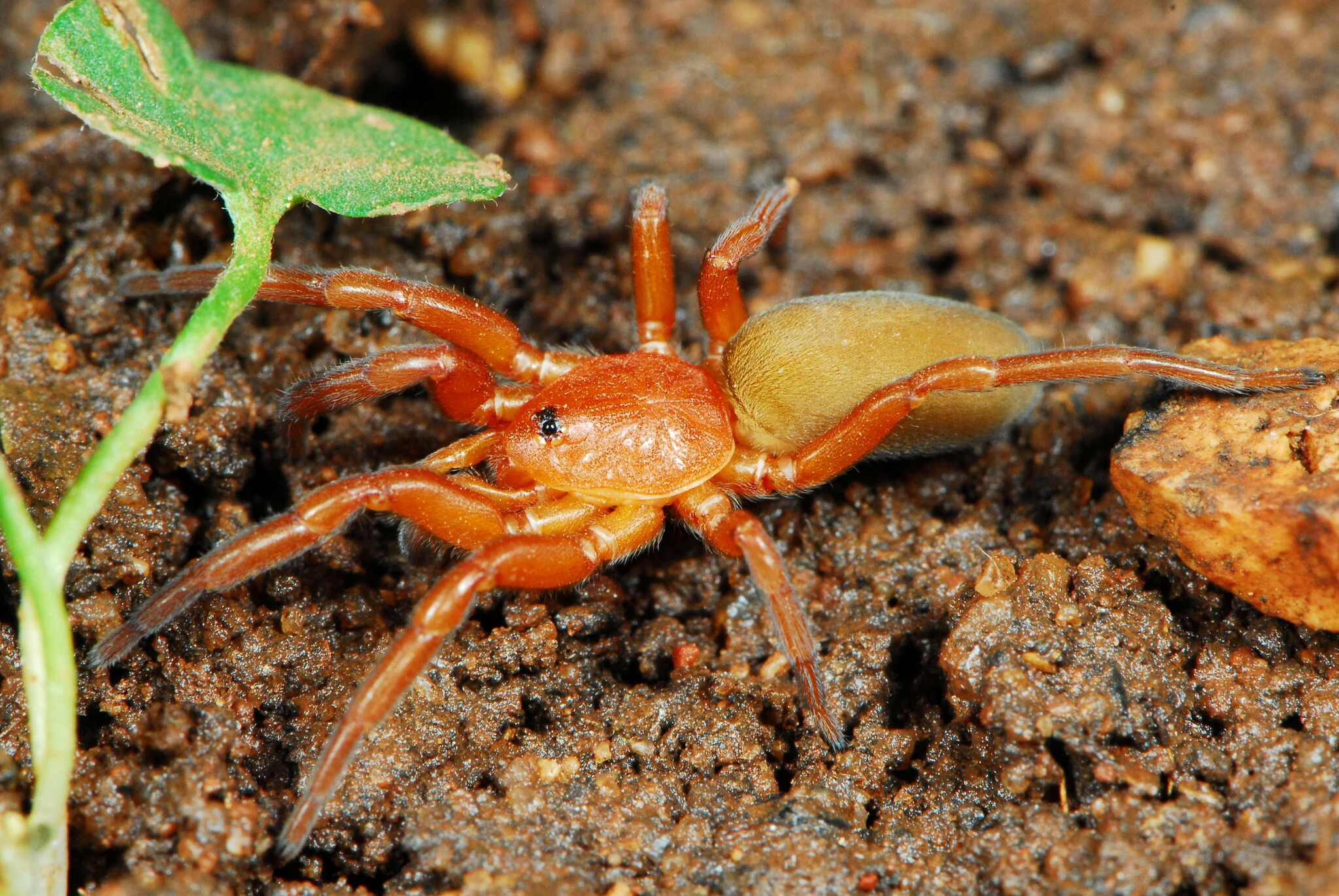
- Female
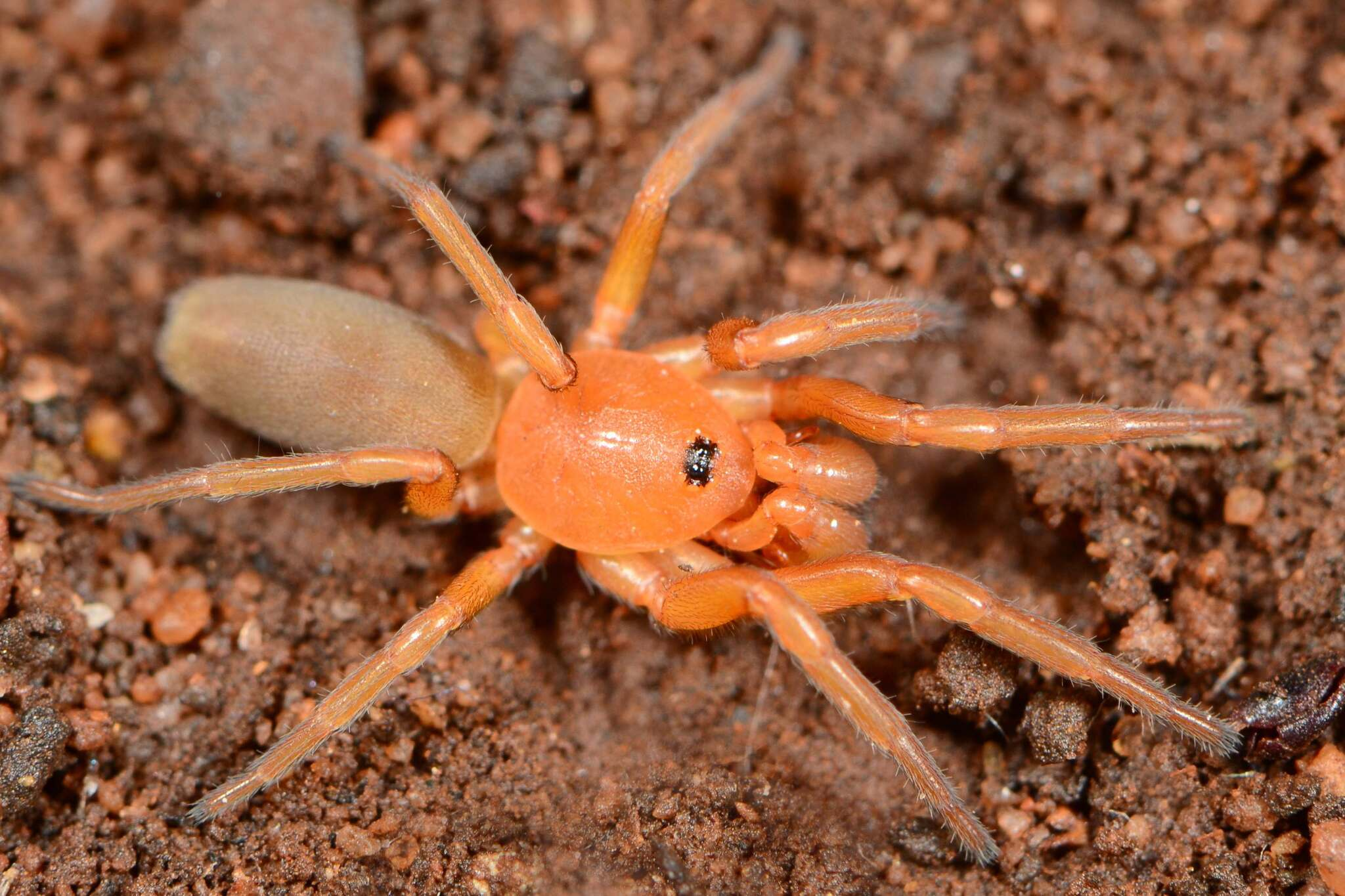
- Male

Scientific classification
- Kingdom: Animalia
- Phylum: Arthropoda
- Subphylum: Chelicerata
- Class: Arachnida
- Order: Araneae
- Infraorder: Araneomorphae
- Family: Caponiidae
- Genus: Caponia
- Species: C. hastifera

Binomial name
- Caponia hastifera Purcell, 1904

= Caponia hastifera =

Willowmore Orange Lungless Spider

Species of spider

Caponia hastifera is a species of spider of the genus Caponia. It is endemic to South Africa.

== Distribution ==
Caponia hastifera has been recorded from two provinces in South Africa: the Eastern Cape and Free State. Notable localities include Willowmore, Port Elizabeth, Ficksburg, and several protected areas including Andries Vosloo Kudu Reserve and Kalkfontein Dam Nature Reserve.

== Habitat ==
The species is a free-living ground dweller frequently sampled in pitfall traps. It has been recorded from the Grassland and Thicket biomes.

== Conservation ==
Caponia hastifera is listed as Least Concern due to its wide geographical range and likelihood of being under-collected. The species is found at elevations ranging from 17 to 1,645 metres above sea level.

The species is protected in Andries Vosloo Kudu Reserve, Amanzi Private Game Reserve, and Kalkfontein Dam Nature Reserve. The species is threatened by habitat loss from infrastructure development in Port Elizabeth and Ficksburg, and crop farming around Dunbrody.

== Description ==
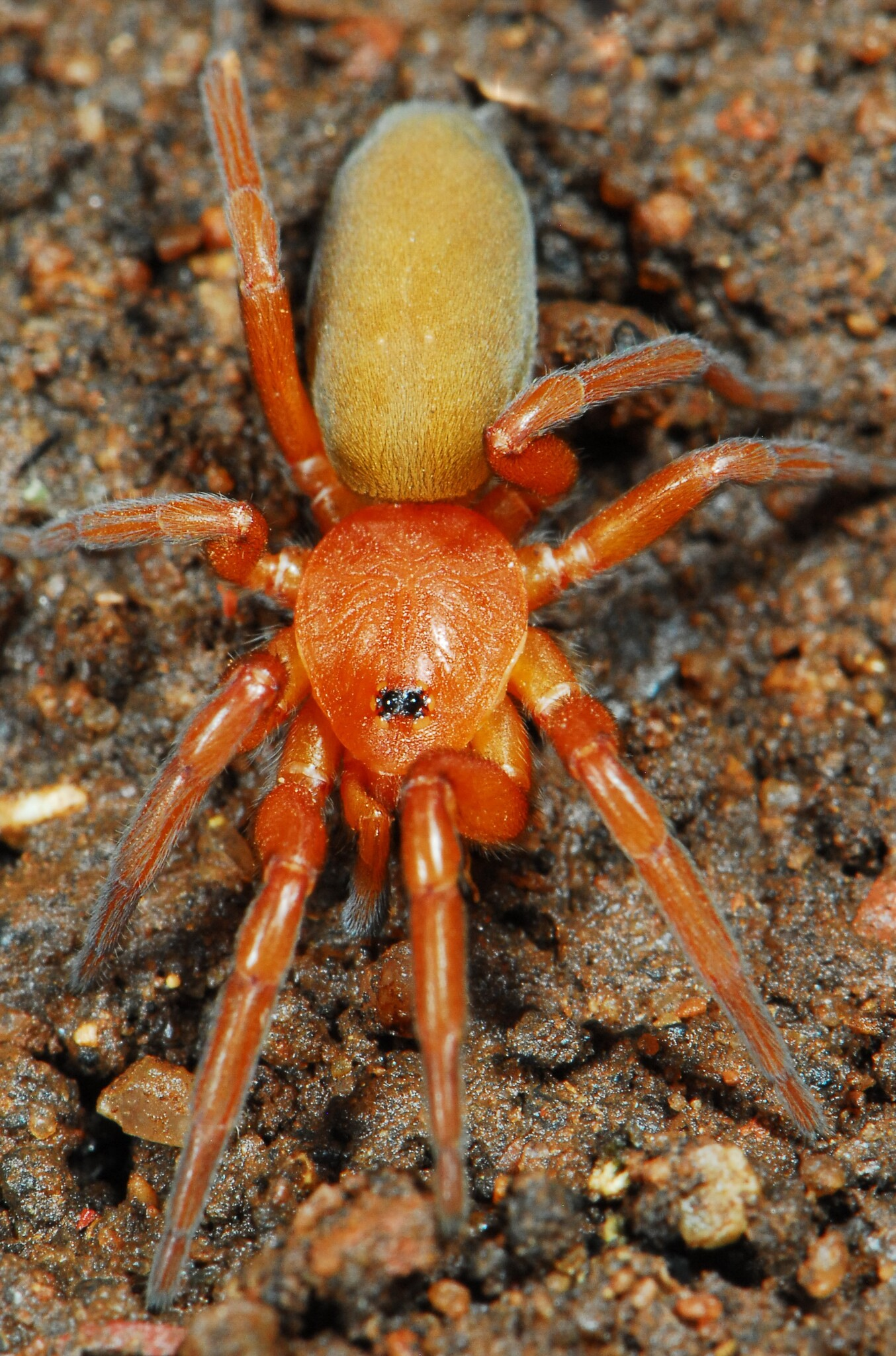
female

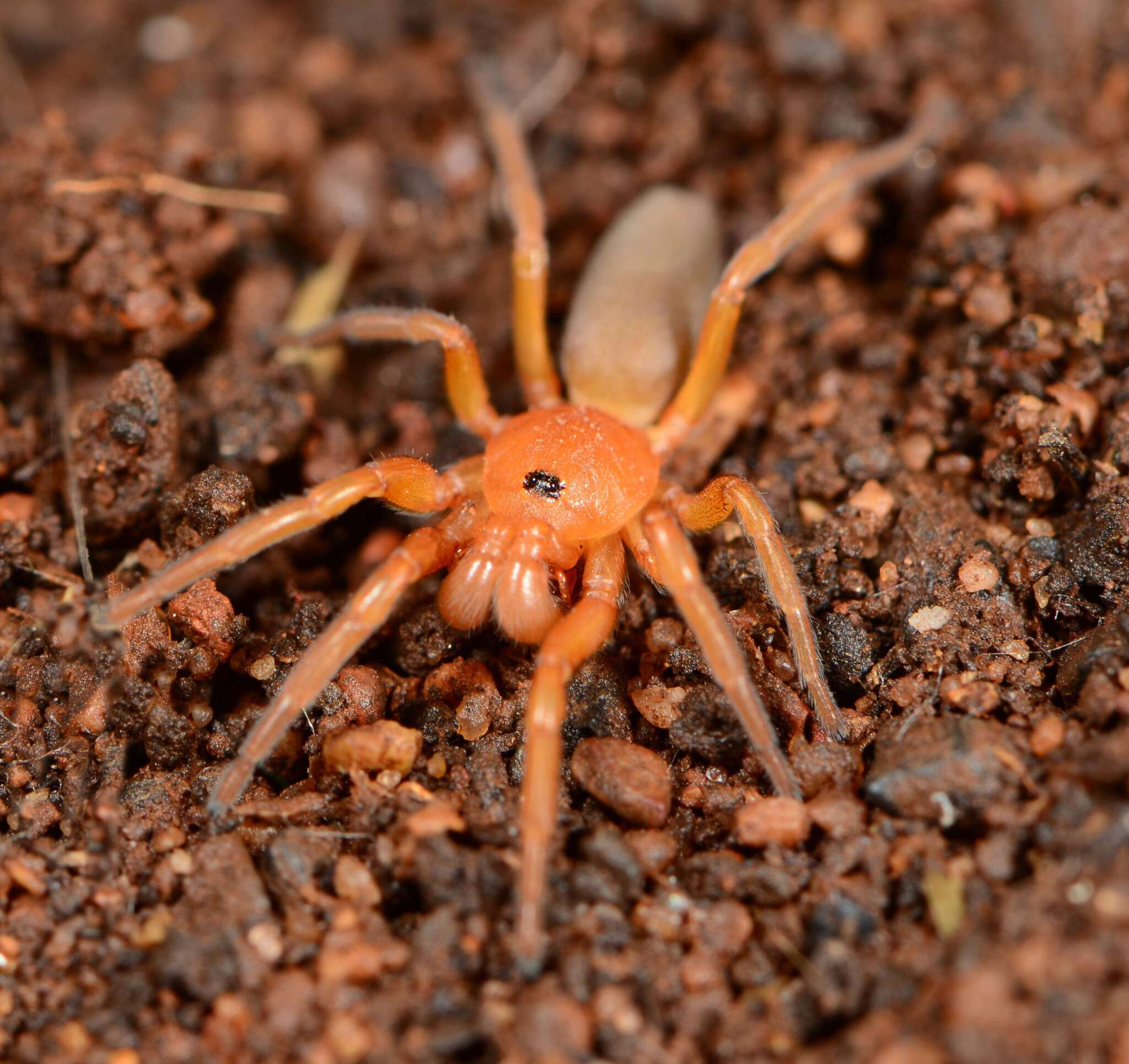
male

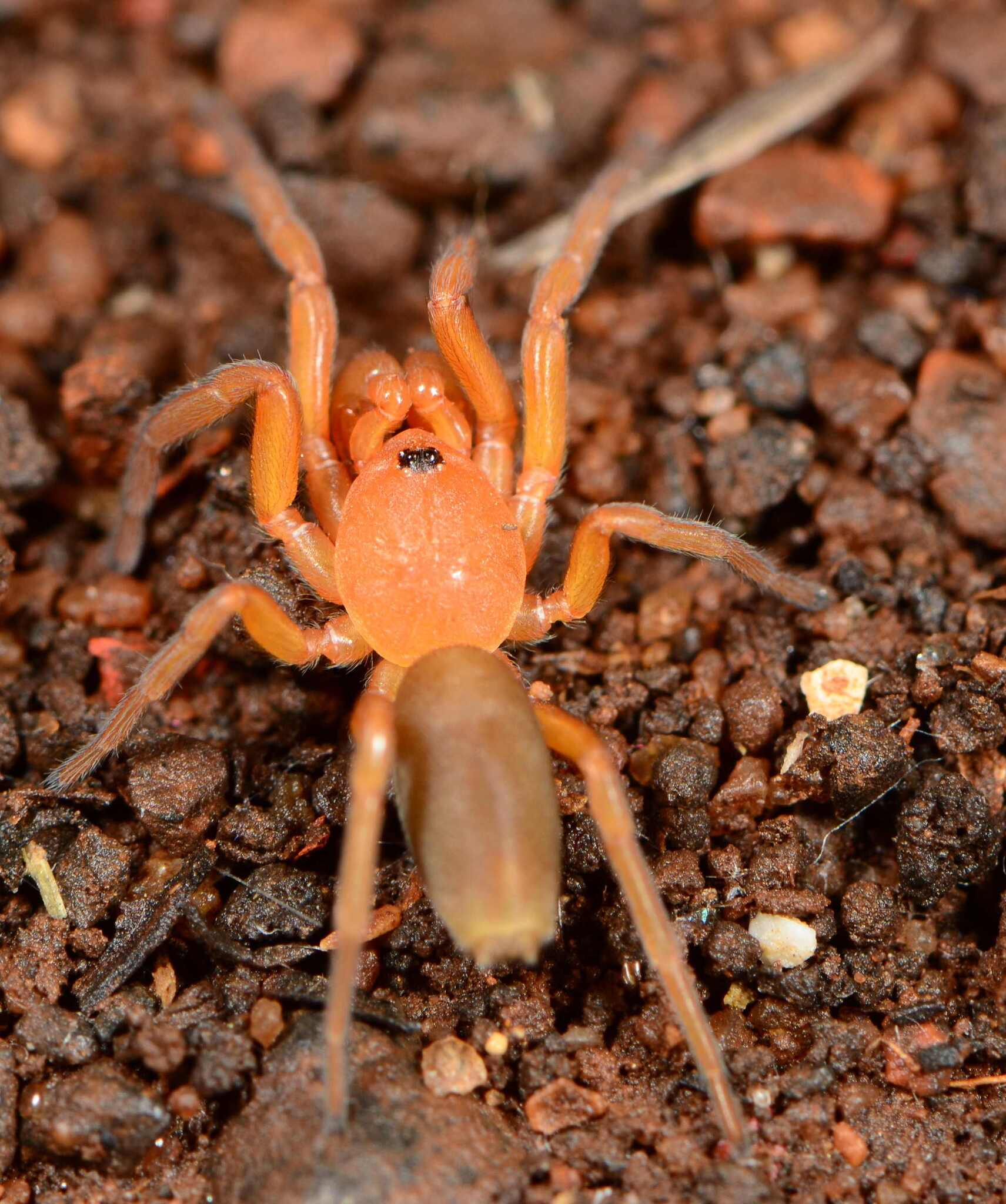
male

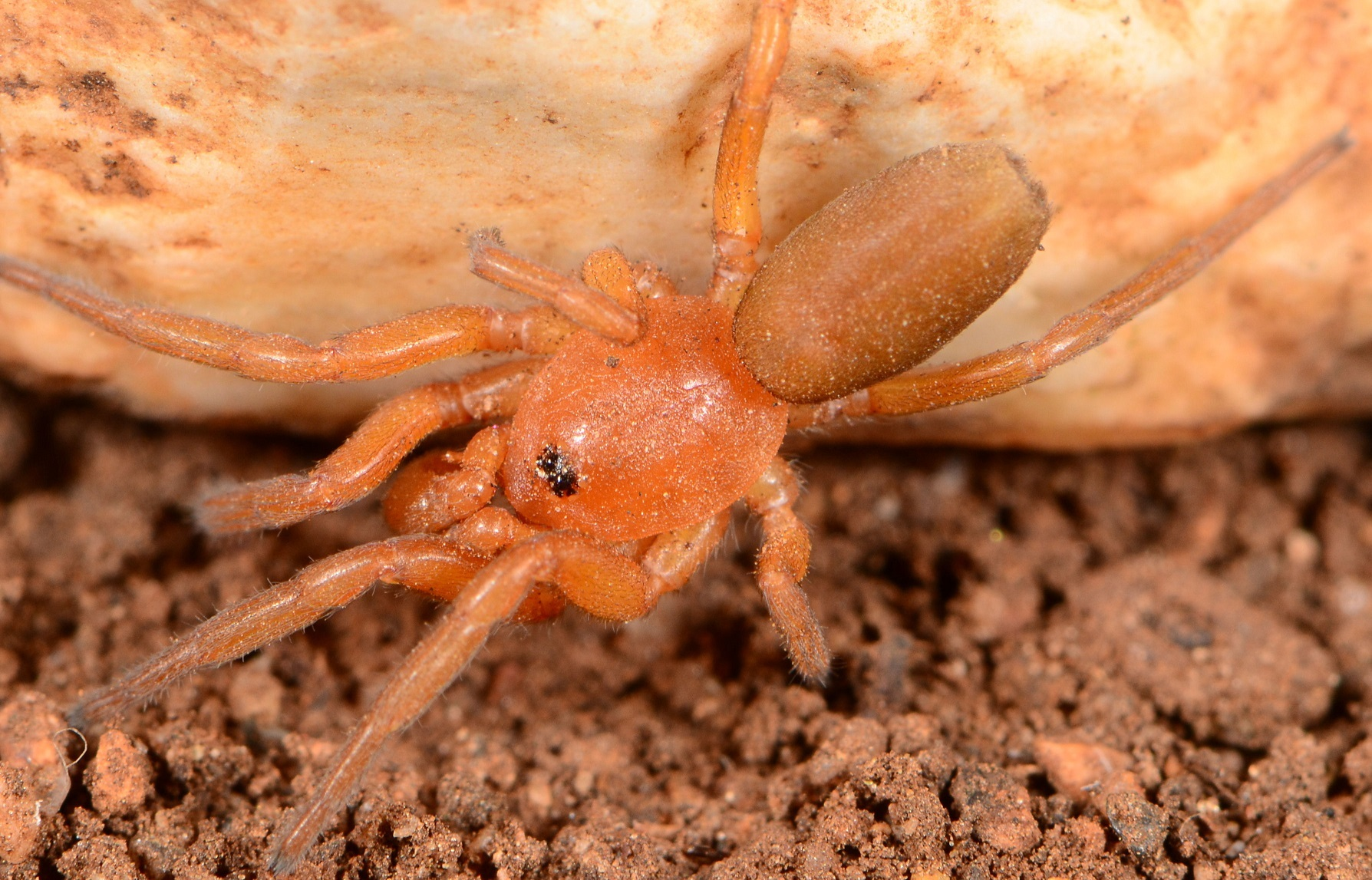
male
