= Bowesdorp =

Bowesdorp was formerly a town between Garies and Springbok, 60 km south of the latter. Established on the farm Wilgenhoutskloof and named after Henry Bowe, doctor in Namaqualand. Situated in a narrow valley between high mountains, there was not sufficient water or space for expansion, and the church, post office, police station and shops were moved to Kamieskroon, 7 km away.
