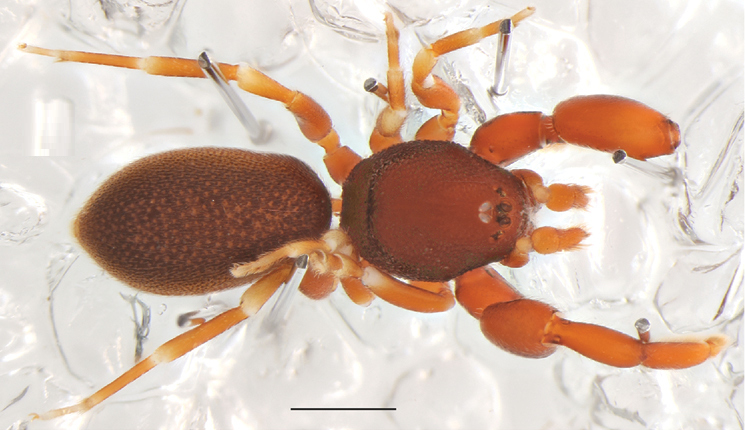
- Diaphorocellus isalo

Scientific classification
- Kingdom: Animalia
- Phylum: Arthropoda
- Subphylum: Chelicerata
- Class: Arachnida
- Order: Araneae
- Infraorder: Araneomorphae
- Family: Palpimanidae
- Genus: Diaphorocellus; Simon, 1893

Type species
- D. biplagiatus Simon, 1893

Species
- 6, see text

= Diaphorocellus =

Genus of spiders

Diaphorocellus is a genus of African palp-footed spiders that was first described by Eugène Louis Simon in 1893.

== Description ==
Diaphorocellus biplagiatus differs from other genera and species of Palpimanidae by the presence of light dorsal spots on the dark grey abdomen, by the large posterior median eyes that are irregularly shaped and very close to each other.

The carapace is longer than wide, often dark to bright red or bright orange, suboval in outline with cephalic region evenly rounded sloping gently towards thoracic region. The fovea is usually distinct. The eyes are arranged in two rows with lateral eyes close together and posterior median eyes white and irregularly-shaped.

The abdomen is grey to purplish, usually with two white oval spots. It is ovate with epigastric region heavily sclerotized forming a ring-like scutum which extends dorsally to encircle pedicel while the rest of abdomen is covered with a light cover of short hair.

The anterior pair of legs are enlarged and much stronger than other three pairs with femur I greatly expanded dorsally and with thick scopula present distally on prolateral surface of tibiae, metatarsi and tarsi. Males are slightly smaller than females with body size ranging from 4-9 mm total length.

== Species ==
As of September 2025, this genus includes six species:

- Diaphorocellus albooculatus Lawrence, 1927 – Namibia
- Diaphorocellus biplagiatus Simon, 1893 – Namibia, Botswana, South Africa (type species)
- Diaphorocellus helveolus (Simon, 1910) – Botswana
- Diaphorocellus isalo Zonstein & Marusik, 2020 – Madagascar
- Diaphorocellus jocquei Zonstein & Marusik, 2020 – Madagascar
- Diaphorocellus rufus (Tullgren, 1910) – Tanzania
