= Namaqua National Park =

South African national park in Namaqualand in the Northern Cape

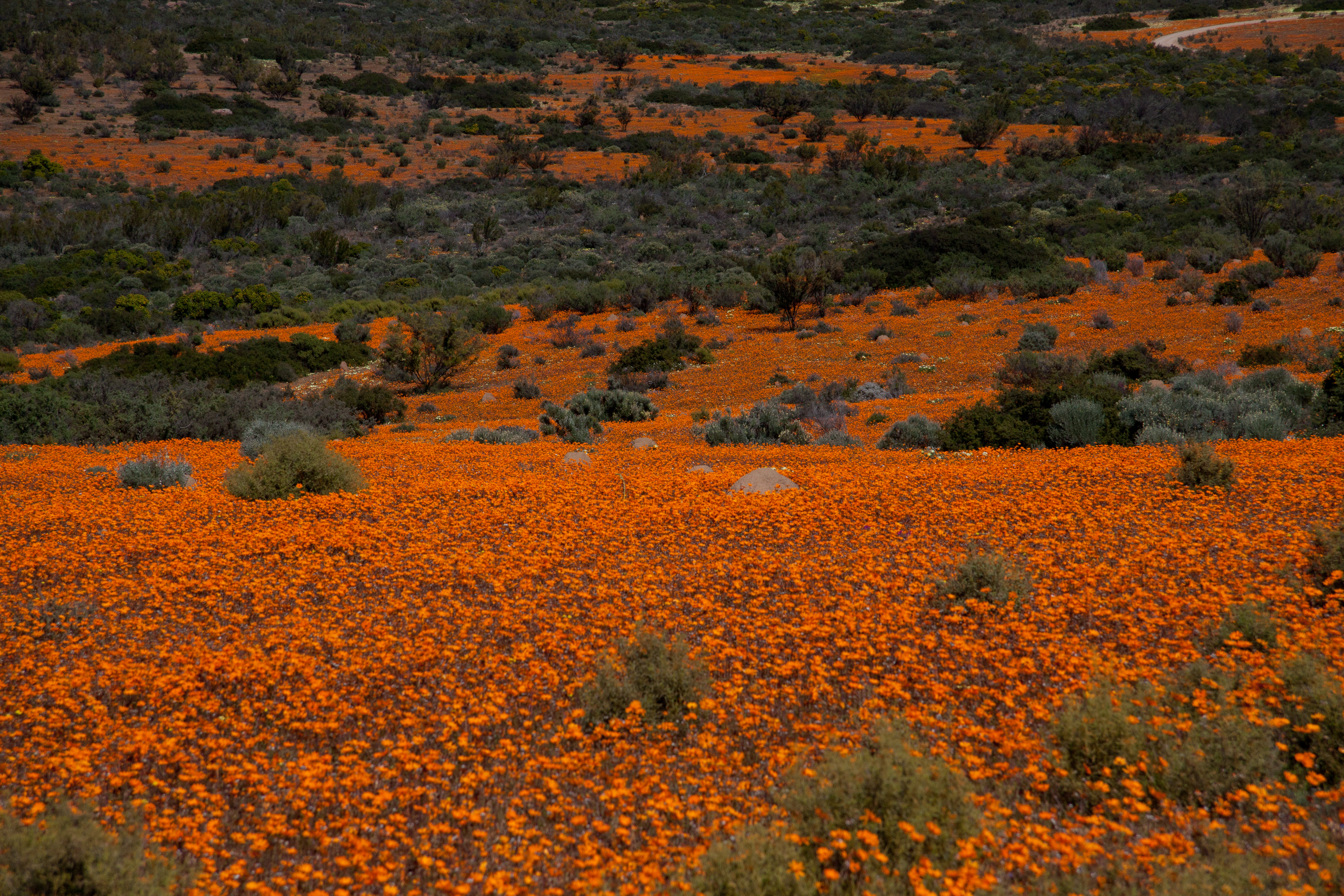
- Spring flowers in the park
- Location of the park
- Location: Northern Cape, South Africa
- Nearest city: Kamieskroon
- Coordinates: 30°2′36″S 17°35′10″E
- Area: 1,368.18 km^{2} (528.26 sq mi)
- Established: 2001
- Governing body: South African National Parks
- Website: sanparks.org/parks/namaqua
- Namaqua National Park (South Africa) Namaqua National Park (Northern Cape)

Namaqua National Park is a South African national park situated on the edge of the Atlantic coast of Namaqualand (an area covering 440,000 km^{2} located within the semi-desert Succulent Karoo biome). This biome is a biodiversity hotspot with the largest concentration of succulent plants in the world. The park also has an arid environment with succulent plants. The park was created to protect its endemic flowers. During the spring, wildflowers bloom there in a spectacular fashion. The park's main tourist attraction is this abundant spring bloom of brightly coloured wildflowers.

The park has an area of more than 1300 km^{2}, and is approximately 495 km north of Cape Town and 22 km northwest of Kamieskroon.

== Geography and climate ==
Namaqua National Park is located in Northern Cape Province, near South Africa's border with Namibia. The park is located approximately 495 km north of Cape Town and 22 km northwest of Kamieskroon. It was officially gazetted in August 1999. Skilpad Nature Reserve, formed in 1993 to protect Namaqualand's plant life, formed the nucleus of the new national park with the addition of 500 km^{2} of land to create the park. 270 km^{2} has since been added to the park, and it now has an area of more than 700 km^{2}. The park is semi-desert, with hot and dry summers and cold winters with variable, generally sparse rainfall. Most precipitation occurs between May and August. The eastern part of the park receives more rainfall than the west.

== Biodiversity ==
The park is located in Namaqualand, which lies within the Succulent Karoo. Namaqualand has an area covering 440,000 km^{2}, located in the northwest corner of Northern Cape Province.

=== Biome ===
The park is part of the semi-desert Succulent Karoo biome, one of the most unusual biomes in the world. This biome is a biodiversity hotspot with the greatest biodiversity and the highest concentration of succulent plants of any of the world's arid regions. The biome has an area of about 107,200 km^{2}, stretching along South Africa's and southern Namibia's western coasts, and includes most of the Richtersveld. There are more than 5,000 plant species in this biome, including more than a third of all the succulent species in the world. Approximately 40% of the biome's plant species are endemic and 18% are threatened. The biome also has diverse invertebrate and reptile species, some of which are endemic. Illegal plant harvesting, overgrazing, and mining threaten endemic species. Only a very small percentage of the Succulent Karoo's area is formally protected, including the Knersvlakte Nature Reserve, the Richtersveld Community Conservancy, and Namaqua National Park.

=== Flora ===
During most of the year, very little flora except hardy shrubs can be seen in Namaqualand's arid landscape. However, in August and September, after the winter's rains, wildflowers bloom in a spectacular fashion over hundreds of square kilometres. These many-coloured flowers include daisies, lilies, aloes, and perennial herbs. Namaqualand is famous throughout the world for the spectacular sight of its many coloured wildflowers during the spring. About 4,000 plant species grow in this area, and Namaqualand has more than 1,000 types of flowers that do not grow anywhere else in the world. It has many species of succulent plants, for example vygies which have attractive blooms. The plump leaves of many types of succulents retain moisture, and many of them grow low to the ground and have a stone-like appearance. Some species of trees here can store water in the dry environment, such as the quiver tree's fat trunk. The flowers' blooms are dependent on the amount of rainfall that the area receives. The flowers are sensitive to sunlight and many will only open when there is bright sunshine. The flowers face the sun, and they generally open completely from about 10 am to 4 pm. Hot winds can cause the blooms to quickly shrivel.

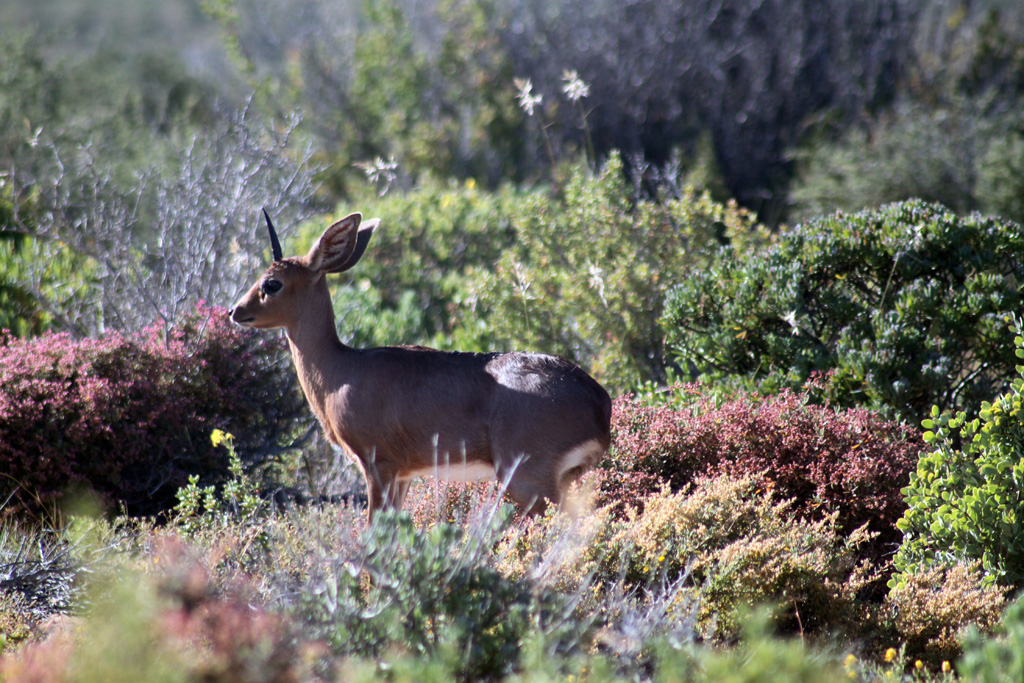
Steenbok amongst the fynbos vegetation

=== Fauna ===
The speckled padloper, the smallest tortoise in the world, can be found in the park.

Many insect species are attracted to the flowers.

By 2017, arachnids from 21 families have been sampled in the park, which included 60 species of spiders. Hottentotta arenaceus, is a pale orange-yellow scorpion which occurs in the park's coastal section. Diaphorocellus biplagiatus and Asemesthes affinis occur, the latter species only found again in Angola. Xysticus cribratus has been recorded, though it has an extensive global range.

== Tourism ==
An estimated 100,000 tourists visit Namaqualand every year. 65% of these visitors are South African and 35% are from other countries. The government has identified tourism as a means to improve the region's economy, and tourism in this area has been promoted through marketing. However, the region's residents continue to have very low incomes and there is a high unemployment rate.

Namaqua National Park has the ecological tourist attractions of the wider Namaqualand region. The bloom of spring flowers in disused wheat fields is the park's main tourist attraction. Tourist facilities include a 5 km long scenic route, two nature walks, places to picnic, and an information centre for visitors. The park has not yet been fully developed and the Skilpad area of the park can only be visited by tourists during the flower season in the spring. Most of the wildflower species are protected under law, with the possibility of fines for those who pick them.

There are now 4 chalets available for overnight accommodation, 1 of which is accessible to disabled persons. Accommodation is for 2 adults with provision for 1 adult or 2 children on a sleep couch. There is 220 V electricity, but guests are required to bring all their own provisions, as the nearest basic shop is 22 km distant.

== Gallery ==
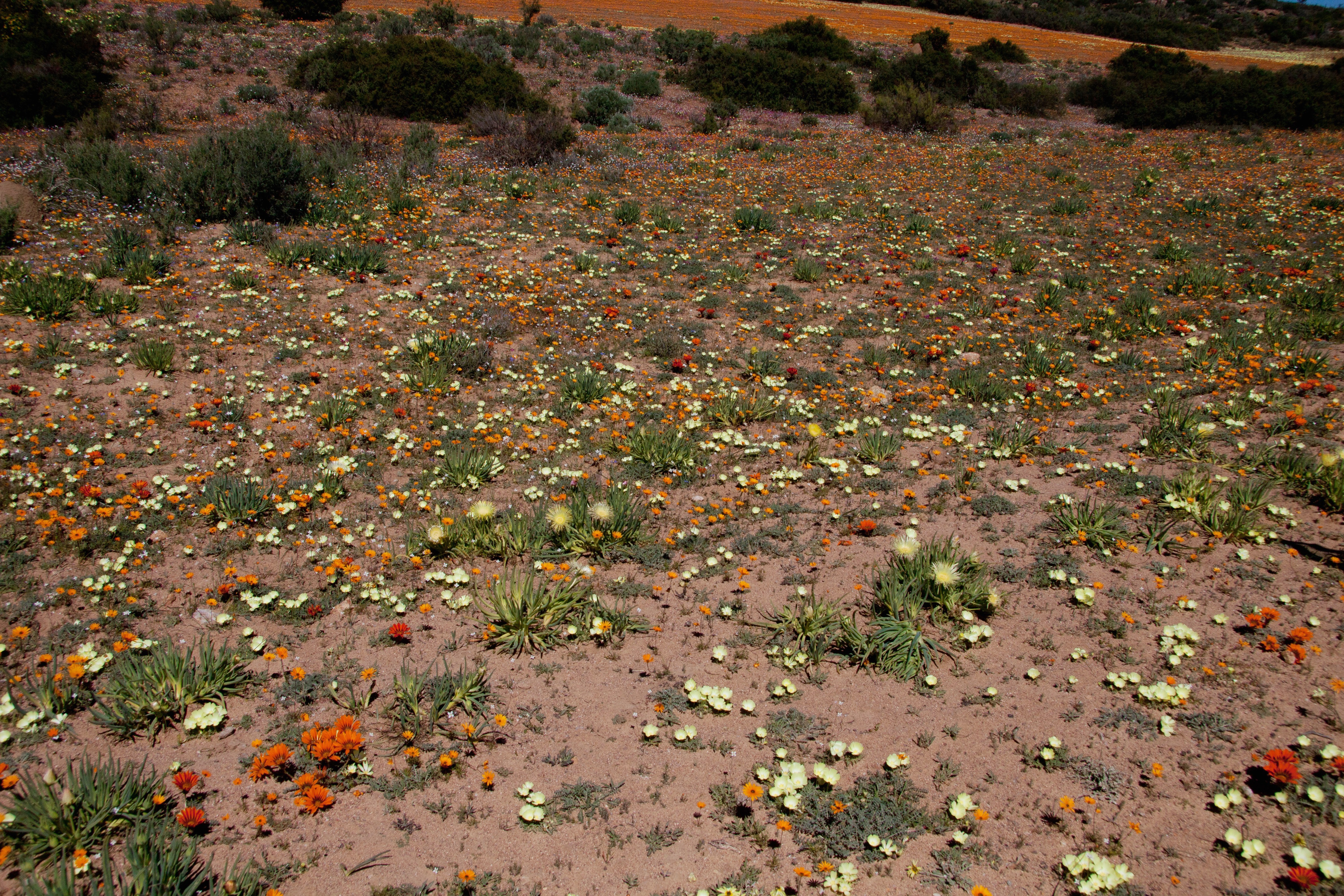
Spring flowers in the park

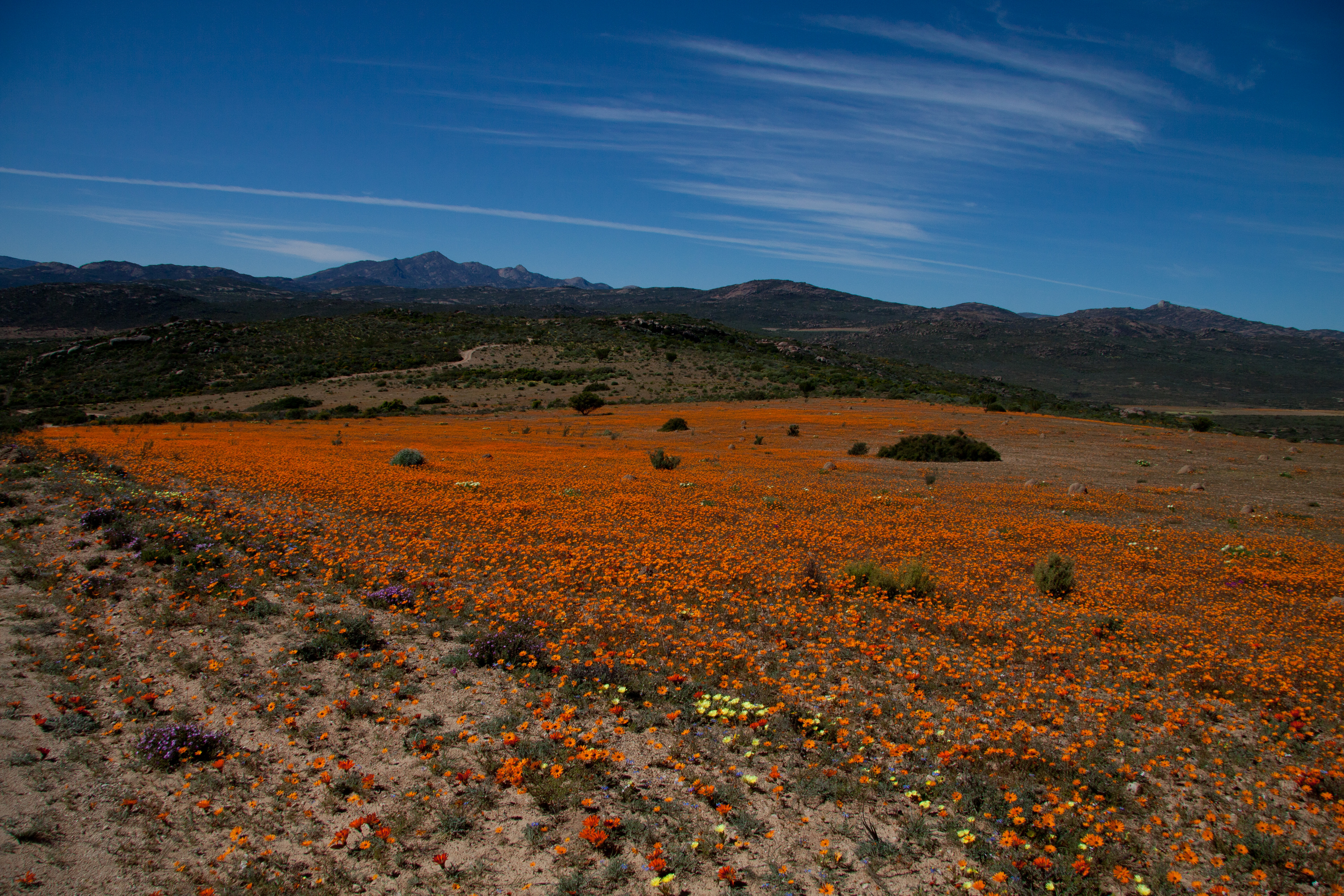

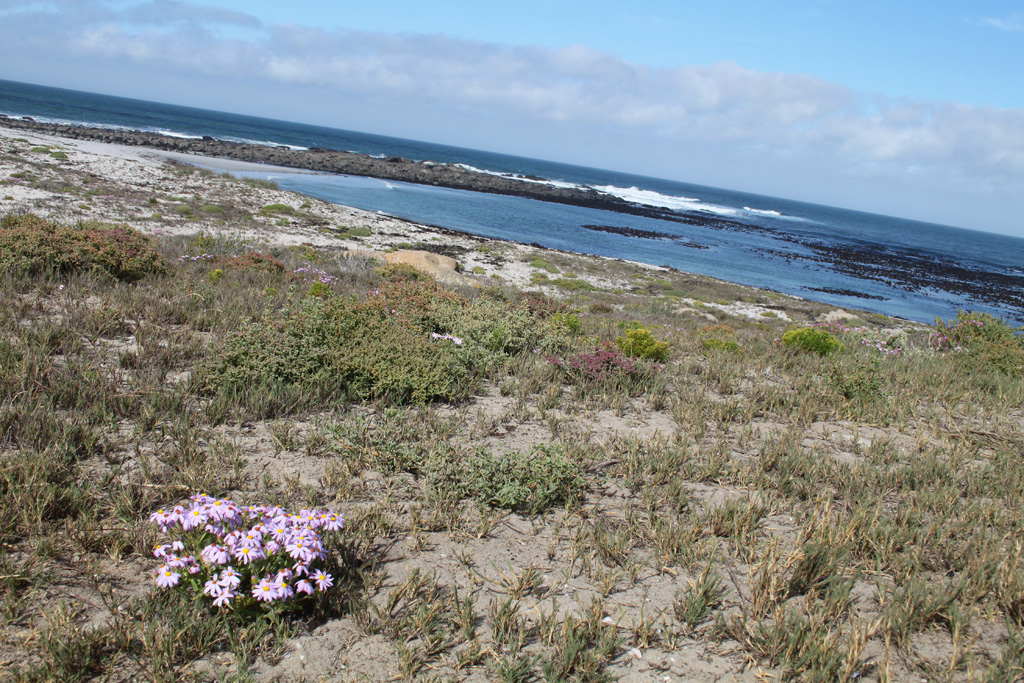
Coastal section

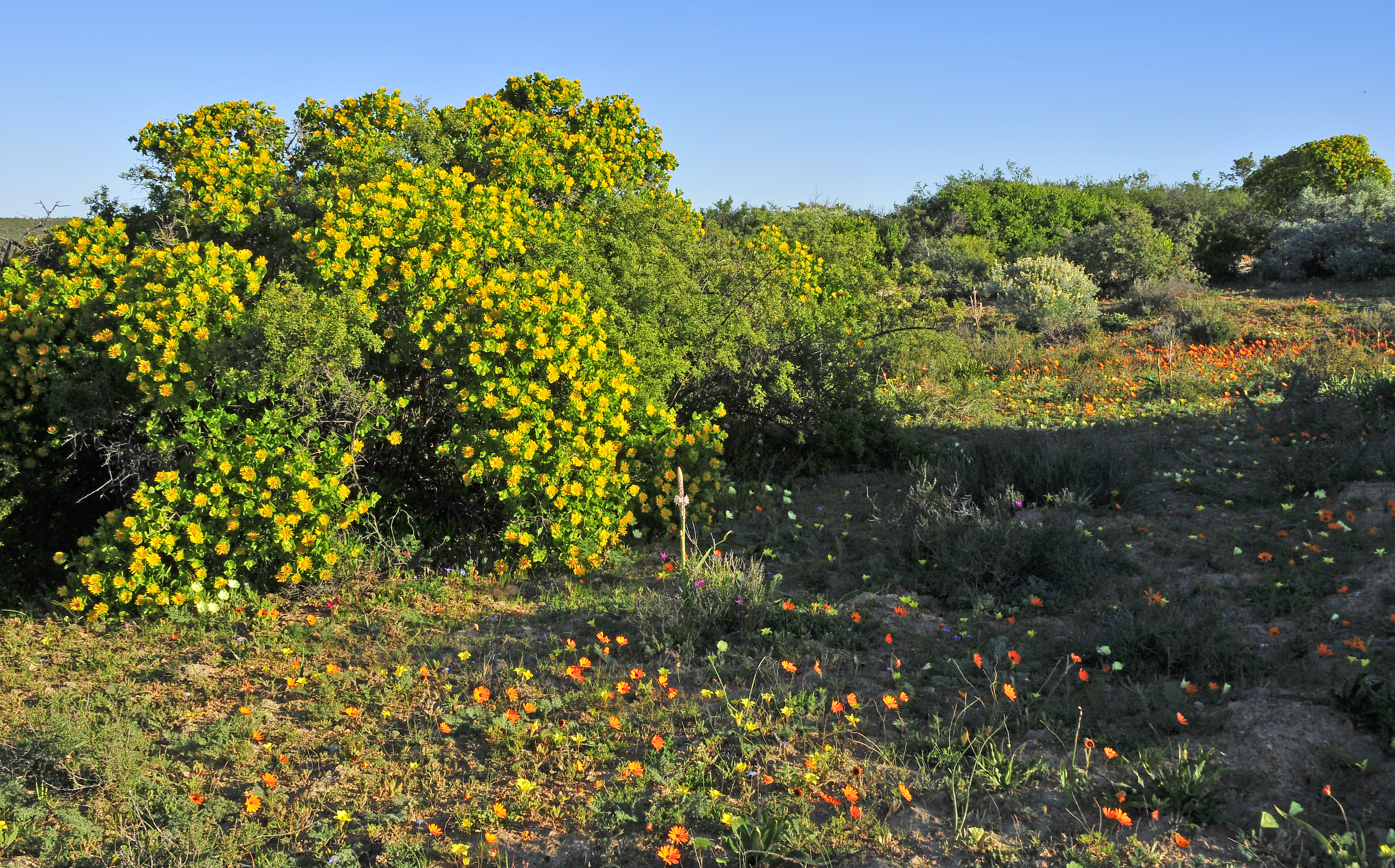
Vegetation in the Skilpad section
