= Kamieskroon =

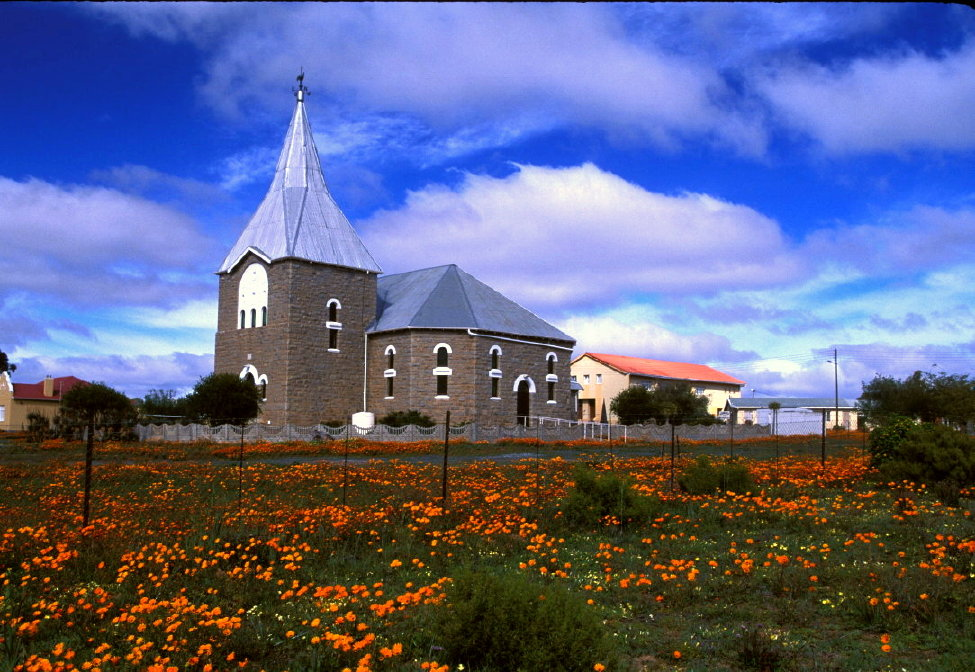
- Kamieskroon Church

- Location within Northern Cape Location within South Africa
- Coordinates: 30°12′S 17°56′E
- Country: South Africa
- Province: Northern Cape
- District: Namakwa
- Municipality: Kamiesberg

Area
  - Total: 8.78 km^{2} (3.39 sq mi)
- Elevation: 750 m (2,460 ft)

Population (2011)
  - Total: 893
  - Density: 102/km^{2} (263/sq mi)

Racial makeup (2011)
  - Black African: 10.8%
  - Coloured: 76.1%
  - Indian/Asian: 0.1%
  - White: 13.0%

First languages (2011)
  - Afrikaans: 96.9%
  - Tswana: 1.5%
  - Other: 1.5%
- Time zone: UTC+2 (SAST)
- Postal code (street): 8241
- PO box: 8241
- Area code: 027

Kamieskroon is a small town in the Kamiesberg Local Municipality, lying in the foothills of the Kamiesberge at an elevation of approximately 800 m (2 600 ft). The town is more or less in the centre of Namaqualand, about 70 km (43 mi) to the south of Springbok, Northern Cape, South Africa. It is known mainly for its abundance of wild flowers during spring.

Kamieskroon was founded in 1924, when the Dutch Reformed Church bought the land to relocate from Bowesdorp, 8 km to the north of the current location of the town. The move was forced by a shortage of water and restricted space for the growth of the town. Kamieskroon is located at the foot of the "Kroon" (Afrikaans, meaning Crown), a small koppie that resembles the crown of a king and is near Sneeukop, the second highest peak in Namaqualand. Also located close to Kamieskroon is Boesmankop, a mountain that resembles a Boesman (Bushman or San) lying on his back. Between 1969 and 2003 it was a military base housing two Armoured Squadrons equipped with Ratel-90 and four Companies of SA 9th Light Infantry Regiment.

Namaqua National Park is located 20 km west of Kamieskroon. It is 1,000 km^{2} in area and its principal purpose is to preserve the natural local flora. Since 2002 native wild animals have been re-introduced to the Park. (They had been shot out at least a century before). Springbok, Hartebeest and Oryx (Gemsbok) now roam there again.

The climate is arid but temperatures are moderated somewhat by the elevation. Daytime temperatures commonly reach thirty-five degrees Celsius (95 °F) in summer while some frost may be experienced during clear winter nights.
