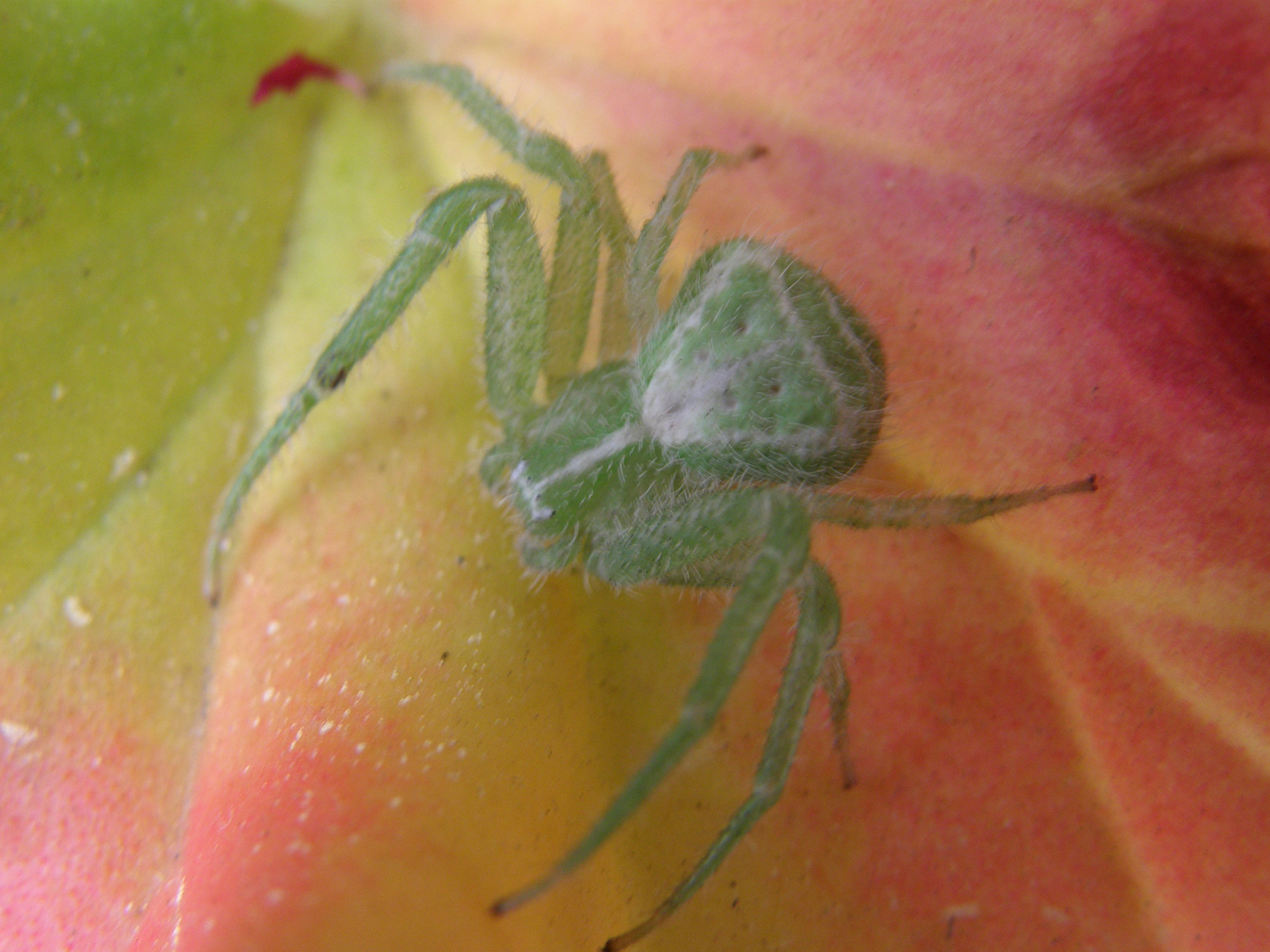
- Heriaeus hirtus, male

Scientific classification
- Kingdom: Animalia
- Phylum: Arthropoda
- Subphylum: Chelicerata
- Class: Arachnida
- Order: Araneae
- Infraorder: Araneomorphae
- Family: Thomisidae
- Genus: Heriaeus
- Species: H. hirtus

Binomial name
- Heriaeus hirtus (Latreille, 1819)

Synonyms
- Heriaeus savignyi Simon, 1875; Misumena savignyi (Simon, 1875); Thomisus hirtus Latreille, 1819; Thomisus pilosus Risso, 1826; Thomisus villosus Walckenaer, 1837; Thomisus hirsutus; Thomisus smaragdinus Bremi-Wolff in Pavesi, 1884

= Heriaeus hirtus =

Species of spider

Heriaeus hirtus is a species of crab spiders belonging to the family Thomisidae.

== Distribution ==
This species is present in most of Southern Europe.

== Habitat ==
These spiders can be found in sunny environments, in bushes and in stony woodlands, especially on hairy plants, on evergreen trees and shrubs.

== Description ==
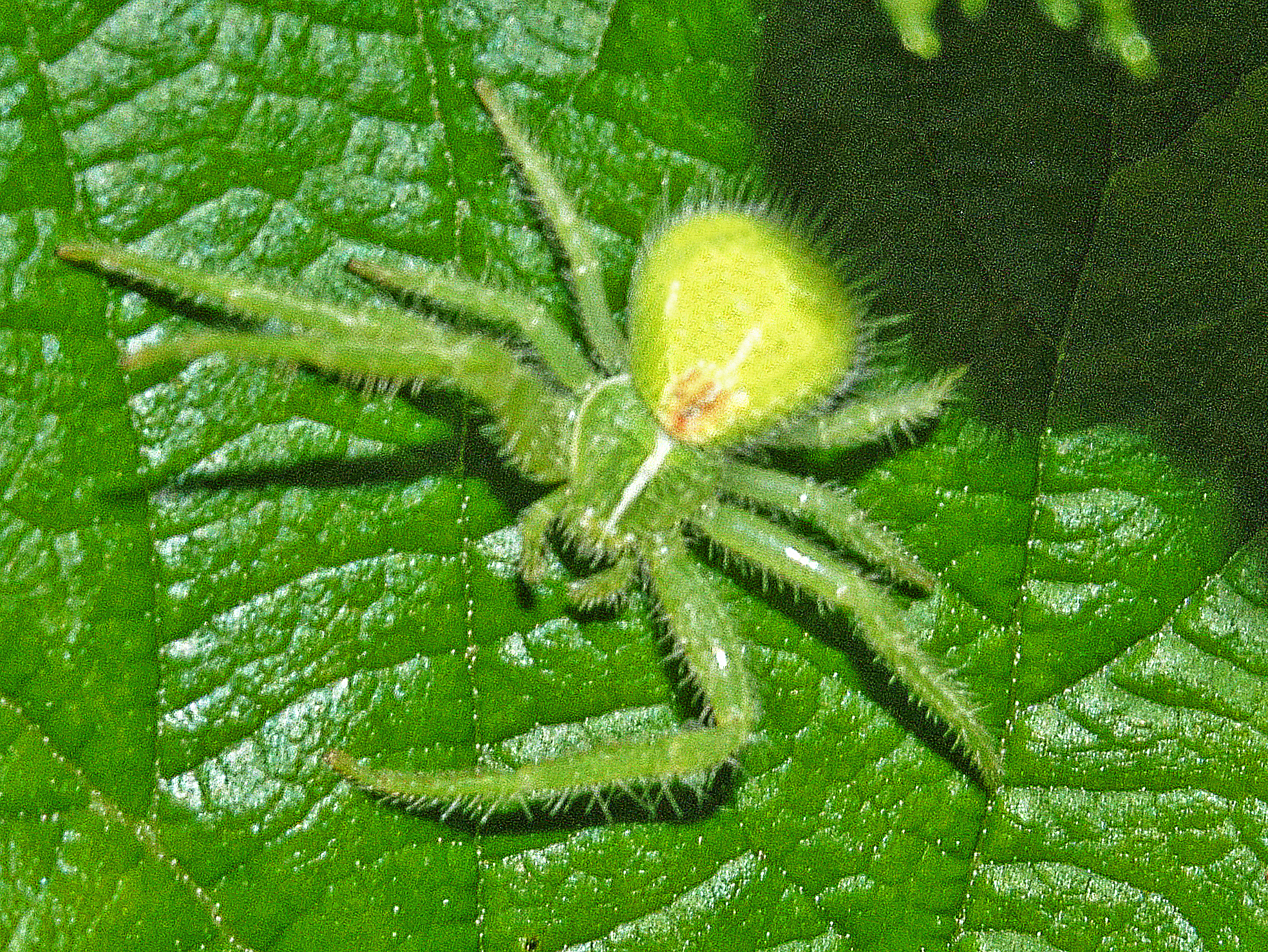
Male

Heriaeus hirtus can reach a body length of 3.5–5.5 millimetres (0.14–0.22 in) in males, of 8–11 millimetres (0.31–0.43 in) in females. These spiders are usually pale green, with a lighter green or pale yellow abdomen, vaguely triangular and longer than wide. The ventral side of the abdomen is green and has rows of black dots. Also legs are green. The body and legs are covered with long white bristles. The cephalothorax is divided longitudinally by a clear median line and usually shows three longitudinal and three transversal clear lines. Males have a slimmer abdomen, usually with a reddish marking. Females are pale green, with long hairs and spines. The external genital structure of female (Epigyne) is quite pale green, with an almost circular tongue. Three teeth are present on the anterior claws. This species is quite similar to Heriaeus melloteei and to Heriaeus graminicola.

== Biology ==
Adults can be found from March to October. They hunt insects, especially bees, wasps, flies and butterflies.

== Bibliography ==
- Latreille, 1819 : Articles sur les araignées. Nouveau Dictionnaire d'Histoire naturelle, Seconde édition, vol. 22, Deterville, Paris.
