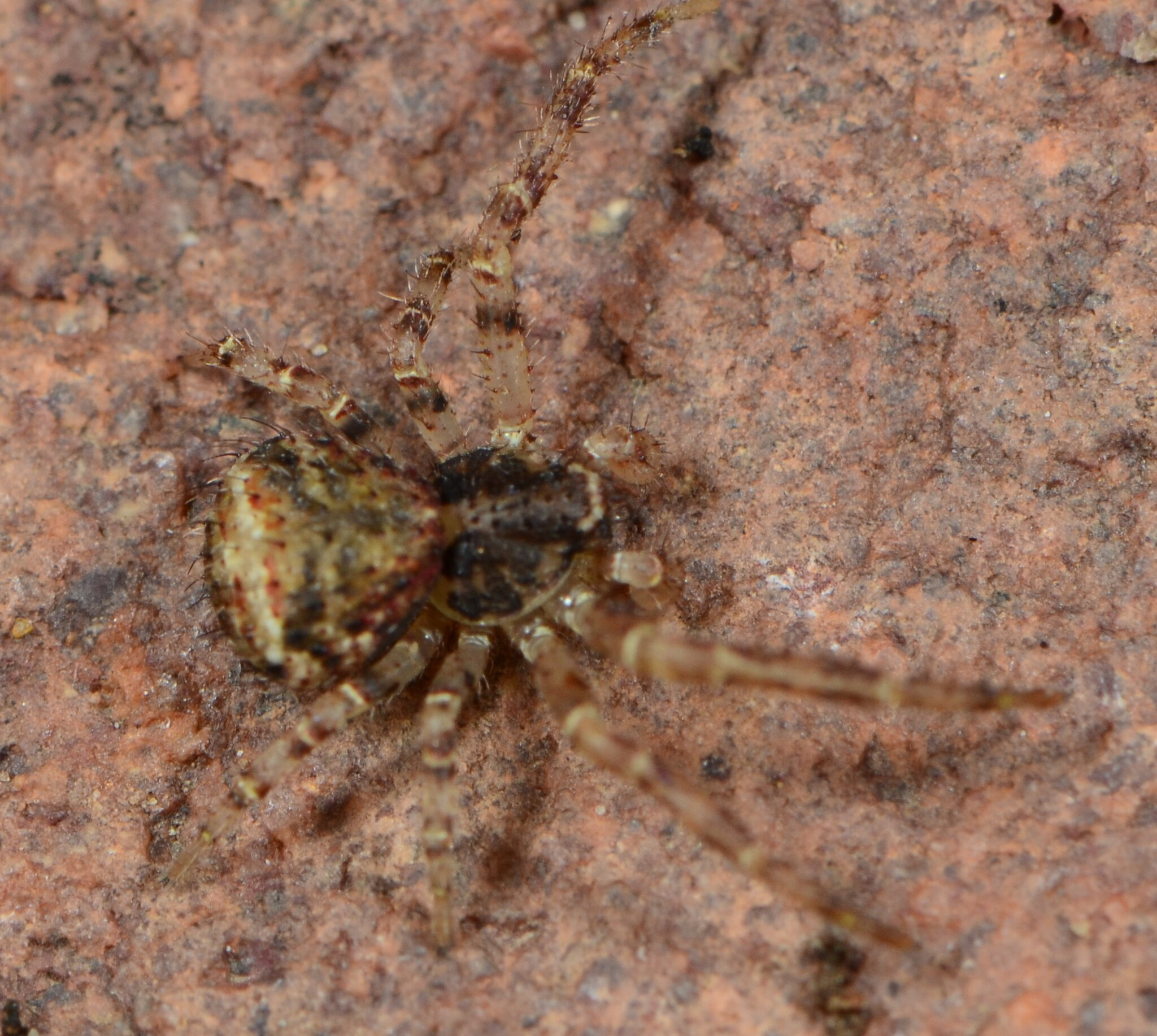
- male

Scientific classification
- Kingdom: Animalia
- Phylum: Arthropoda
- Subphylum: Chelicerata
- Class: Arachnida
- Order: Araneae
- Infraorder: Araneomorphae
- Family: Thomisidae
- Genus: Heriaeus
- Species: H. foordi

Binomial name
- Heriaeus foordi van Niekerk & Dippenaar-Schoeman, 2013

= Heriaeus foordi =

Foord's Hairy Crab Spider

Species of spider

Heriaeus foordi is a species of spider in the family Thomisidae. It is endemic to South Africa and is commonly known as Foord's hairy crab spider.

== Distribution ==
Heriaeus foordi is found only in South Africa, where it is known from the provinces Limpopo, KwaZulu-Natal, and Mpumalanga.

== Habitat and ecology ==
The species found in low vegetation, collected from yellow pan traps and pitfall traps as well as sweeping of vegetation in the Savanna biome at altitudes ranging from 47 to 1331 m.

== Conservation ==
Heriaeus foordi is protected in four protected areas including Atherstone Nature Reserve, Mkuze Game Reserve, Ndumo Game Reserve, and Kruger National Park. Due to its large range, the species is listed as Least Concern by the South African National Biodiversity Institute.

== Etymology ==
The species is named for arachnologist Stefan Foord of the University of Venda, who collected the holotype.

== Taxonomy ==
Heriaeus foordi was described in 2013 from Atherstone Nature Reserve in Limpopo by van Niekerk and Dippenaar-Schoeman.
