= Heriaeus sossusvlei =

Sossusvlei Hairy Crab Spider

Scientific classification
- Kingdom: Animalia
- Phylum: Arthropoda
- Subphylum: Chelicerata
- Class: Arachnida
- Order: Araneae
- Infraorder: Araneomorphae
- Family: Thomisidae
- Genus: Heriaeus
- Species: H. sossusvlei

Binomial name
- Heriaeus sossusvlei van Niekerk & Dippenaar-Schoeman, 2013

Species of spider

Heriaeus sossusvlei is a species of spider in the family Thomisidae. It is commonly known as the Sossusvlei hairy crab spider.

== Distribution ==
Heriaeus sossusvlei is found in Namibia and South Africa.

In South Africa, it is known only from the Western Cape. This species is under-collected and suspected to occur in more localities in South Africa.

== Habitat and ecology ==
Sampled from arid regions from plants and from pitfall traps in the Nama Karoo biome at an altitude of 778 m.

== Conservation ==
The species is not recorded in any protected area. Due to its large range in southern Africa, the species is listed as Least Concern by the South African National Biodiversity Institute. More sampling is needed.

== Etymology ==
The species is named after Sossusvlei in Namibia, where it was first discovered.

== Taxonomy ==
Heriaeus sossusvlei was described in 2013 from Sossusvlei in Namibia and is known only from the female.
