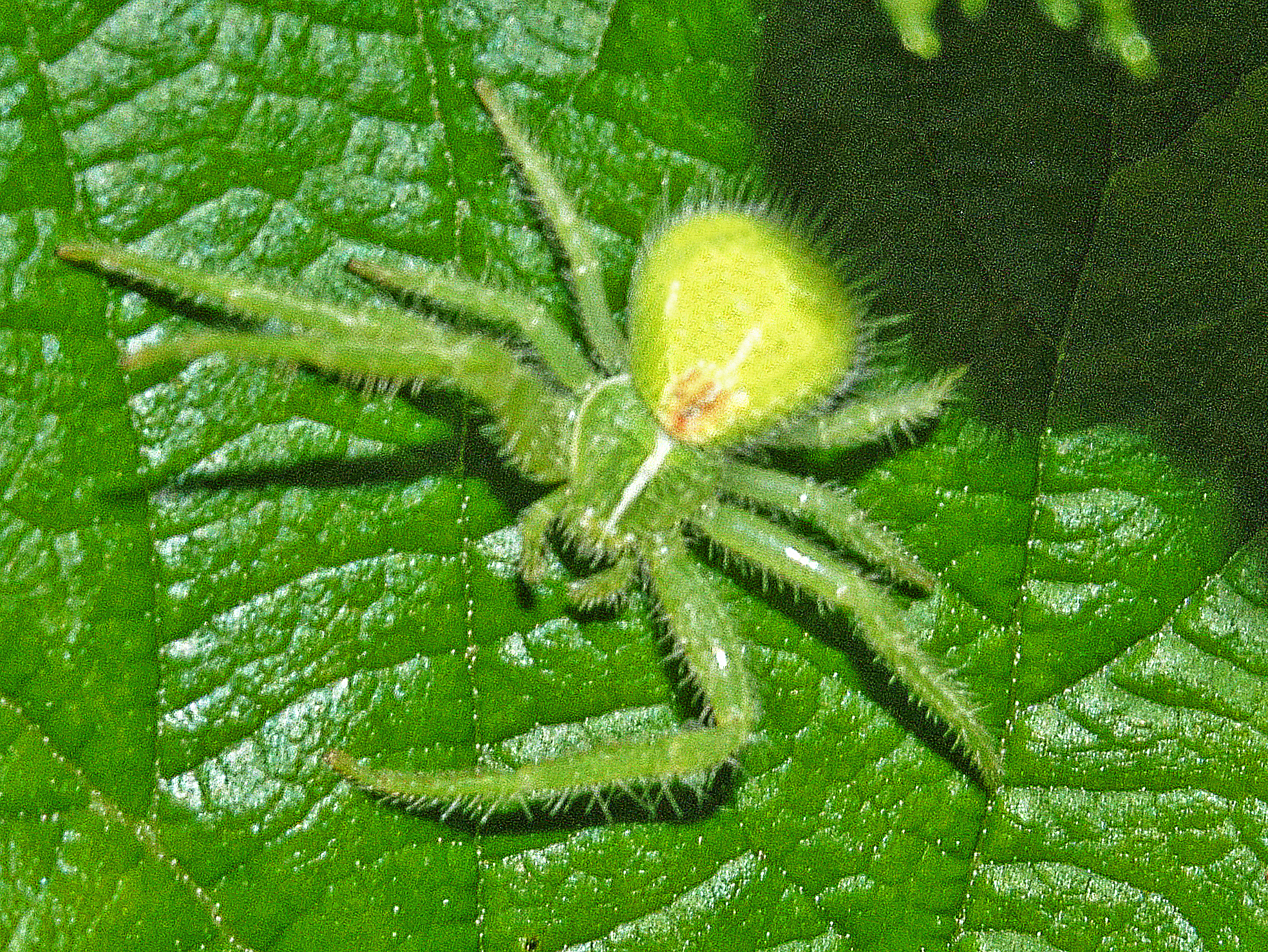
- Heriaeus hirtus
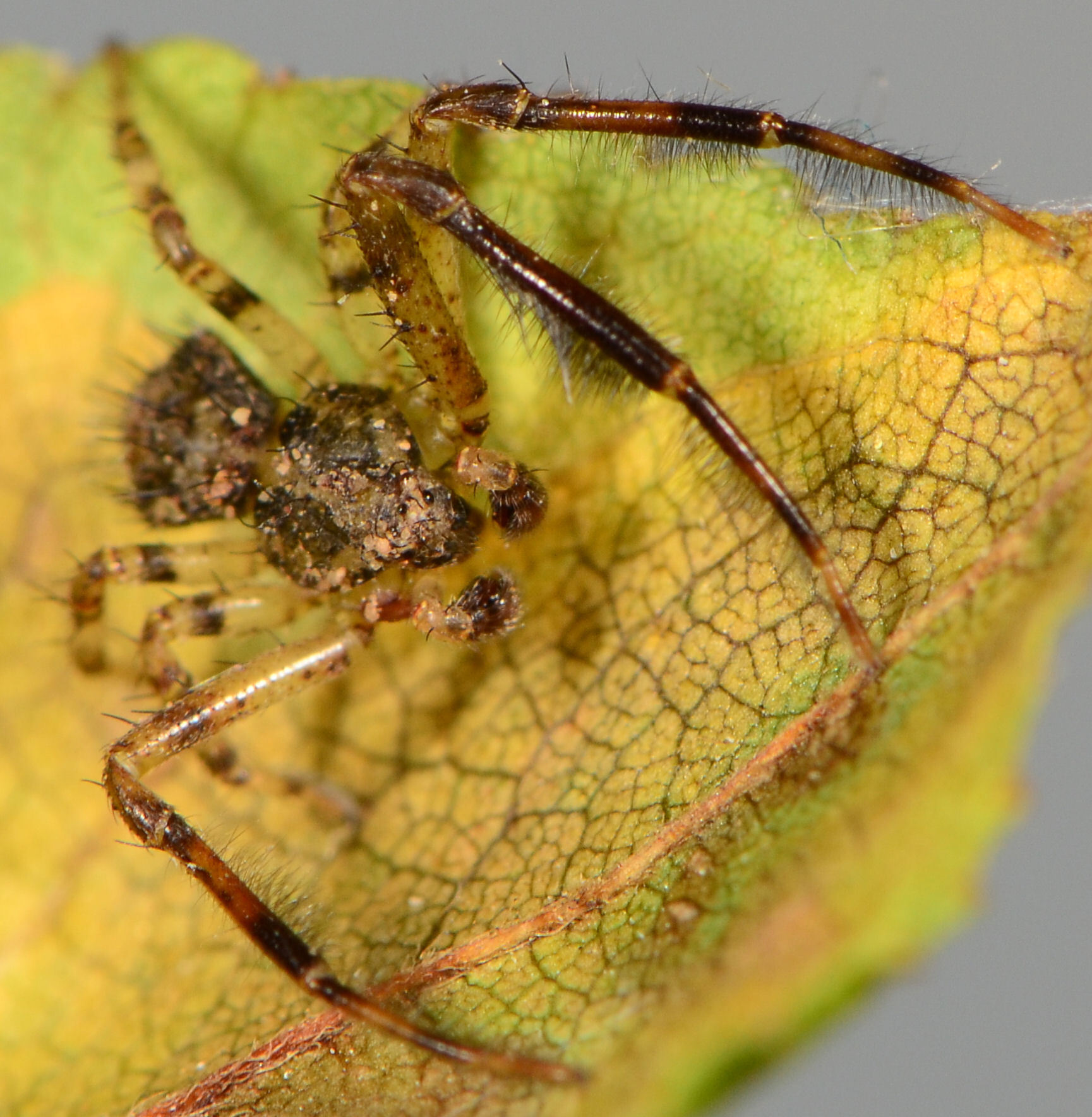
- male H. crassispinus

Scientific classification
- Kingdom: Animalia
- Phylum: Arthropoda
- Subphylum: Chelicerata
- Class: Arachnida
- Order: Araneae
- Infraorder: Araneomorphae
- Family: Thomisidae
- Genus: Heriaeus; Simon, 1875

Type species
- H. hirtus (Latreille, 1819)

Species
- 37, see text
- blue: reported countries (WSC)

= Heriaeus =

Genus of spiders

Heriaeus is a genus of crab spiders that was first described by Eugène Louis Simon in 1875.

== Distribution ==
Most species in this genus are found from Turkey to China, though less than half are African species.

== Life style ==
Heriaeus are free-living plant and ground dwellers.

== Description ==
The genus Heriaeus can be recognized by the integument bearing different types of setae that vary from long white erect setae to a combination of numerous short, club-shaped or blunt-tipped abdominal setae.

Females and males measure 4 to 5 mm in total length, with males slightly smaller. Their colour varies from grey-white to pale green with a pinkish tint.

The carapace is as wide as long and narrower in the eye region, both eye rows are recurved, and eyes are on tubercles with the lateral tubercles larger than the median ones. The abdomen is round to oval with indistinct markings. Legs are the same colour as the carapace.

== Taxonomy ==
The genus was revised by van Niekerk and Dippenaar-Schoeman in 2013.

== Species ==
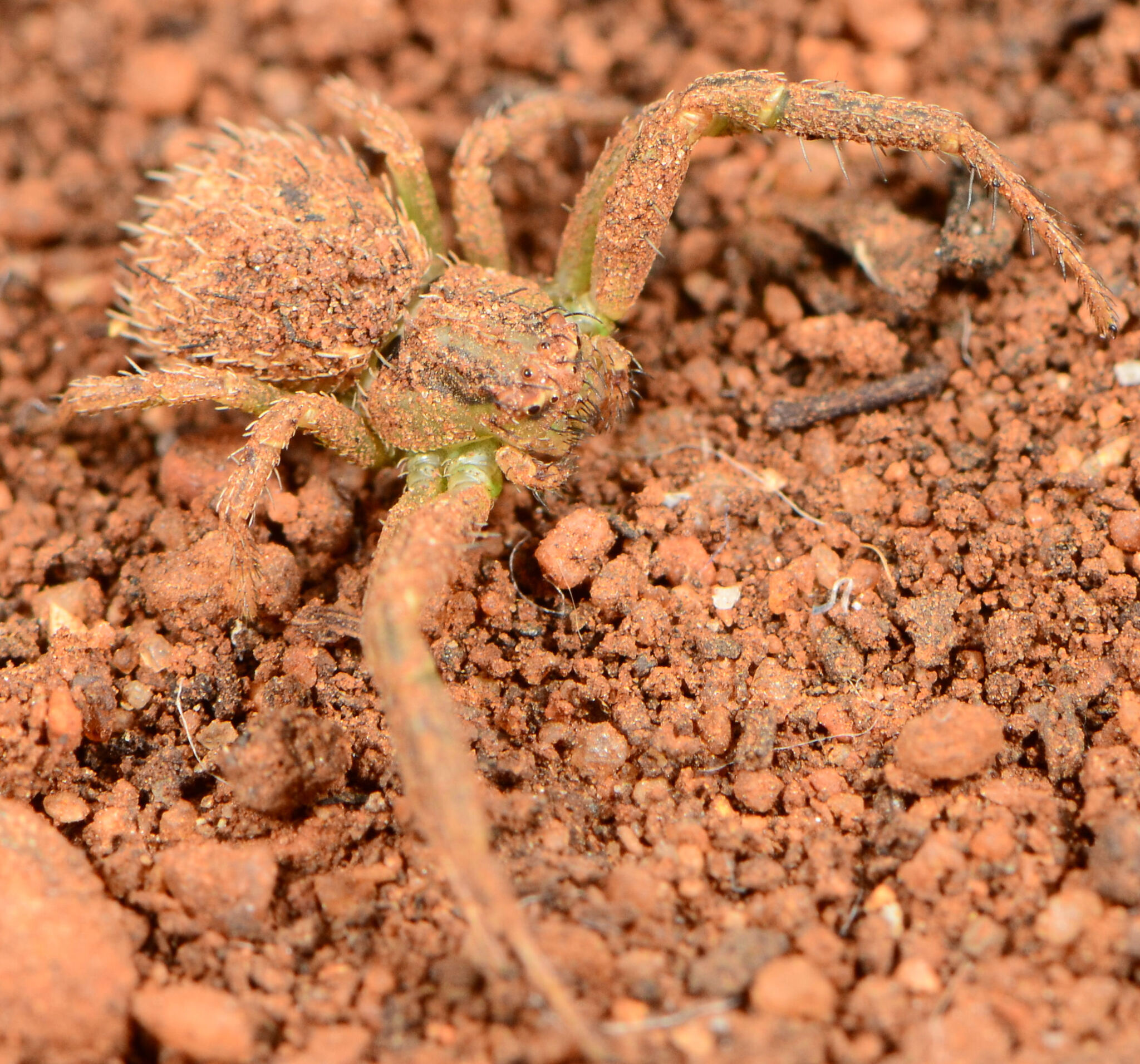
H. copricola

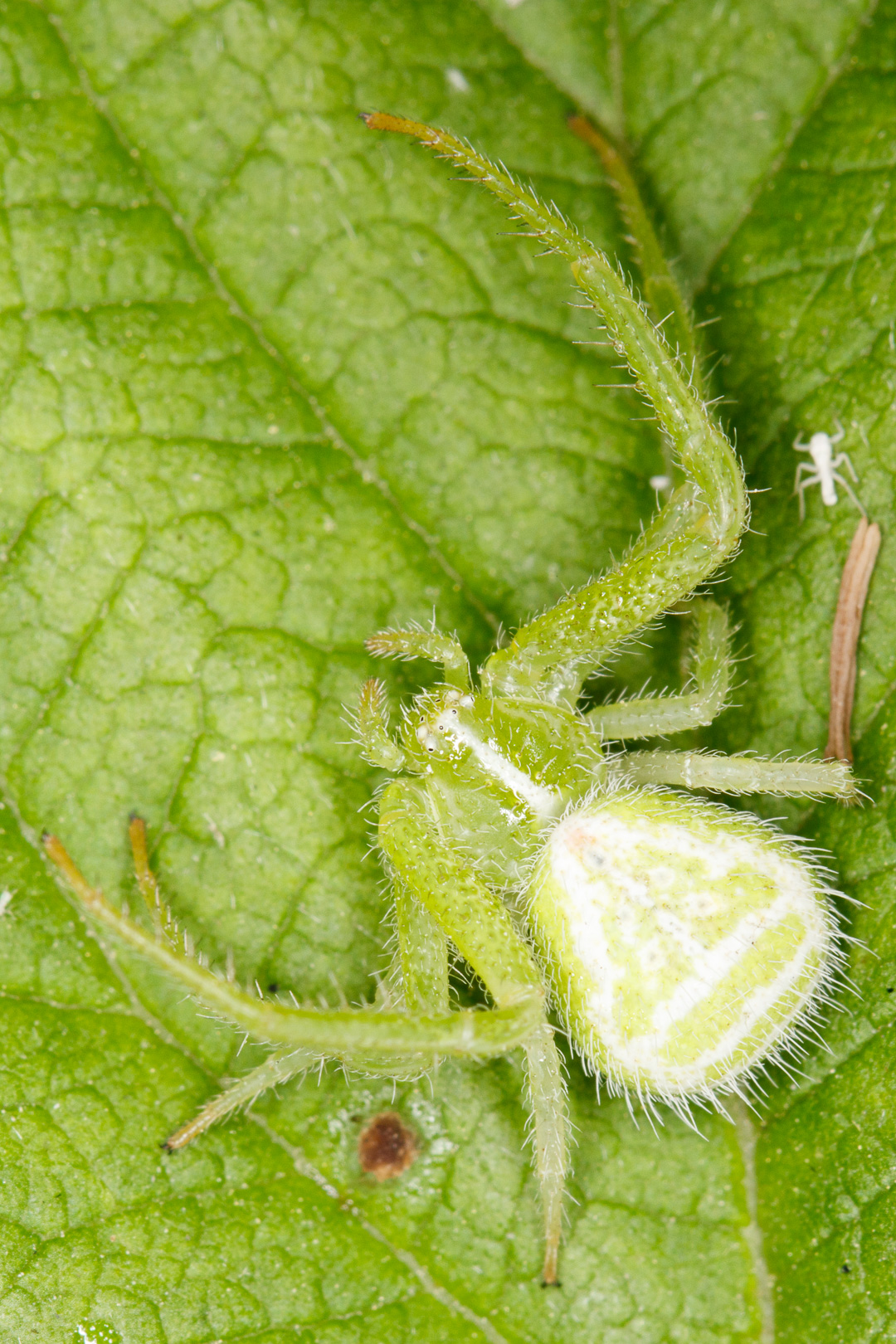
H. graminicola

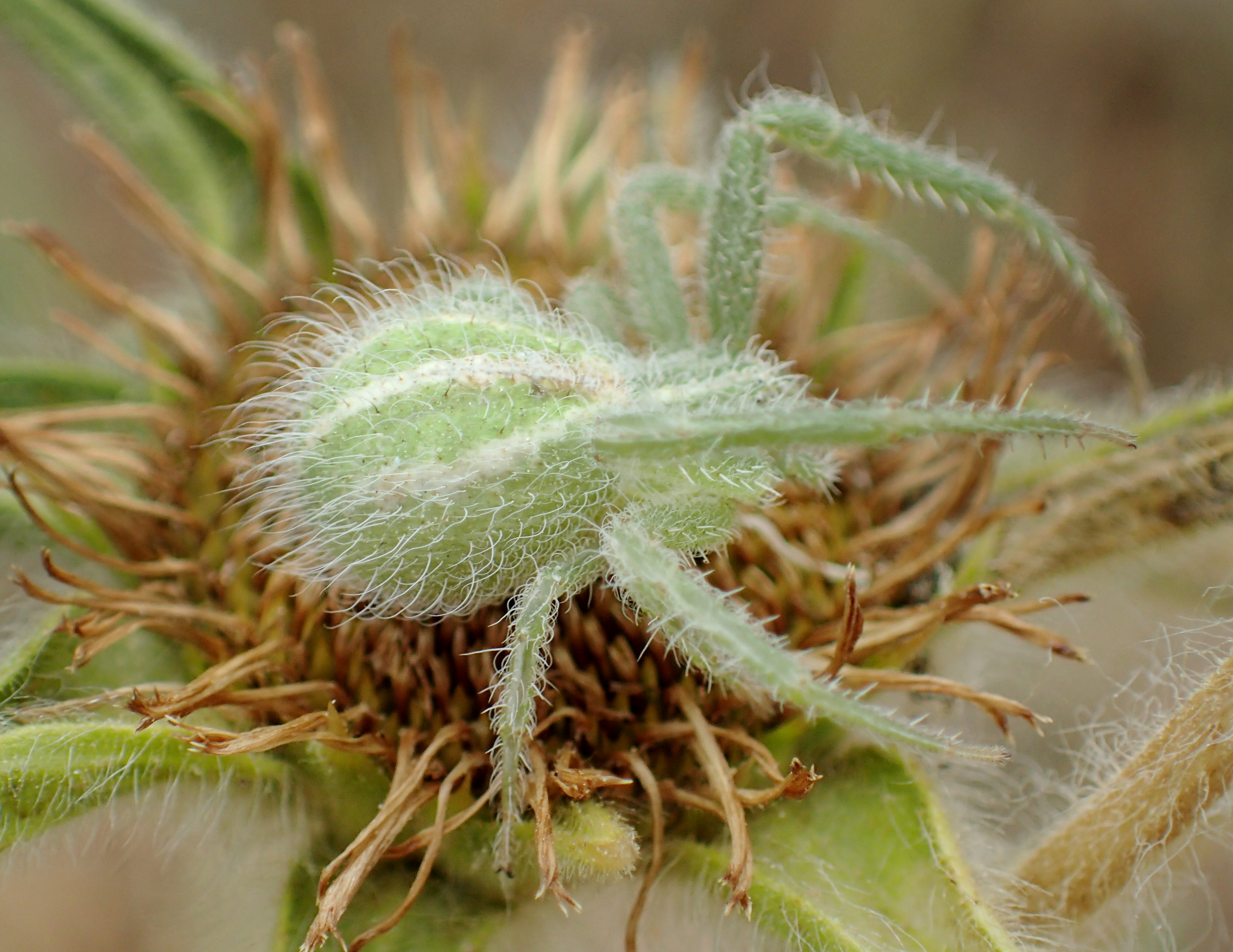
H. melloteei

As of September 2025, this genus includes 37 species:

- Heriaeus algericus Loerbroks, 1983 – Algeria
- Heriaeus allenjonesi van Niekerk & Dippenaar-Schoeman, 2013 – South Africa
- Heriaeus antoni van Niekerk & Dippenaar-Schoeman, 2013 – Senegal, Yemen
- Heriaeus buffoni (Audouin, 1826) – Algeria, Egypt, Morocco, Western Asia, Canary Islands
- Heriaeus buffonopsis Loerbroks, 1983 – Kazakhstan, Turkmenistan, Uzbekistan
- Heriaeus capillatus Utochkin, 1985 – Kazakhstan
- Heriaeus chareshi Sen & Sureshan, 2022 – India
- Heriaeus charitonovi Utochkin, 1985 – Tajikistan, Uzbekistan
- Heriaeus concavus Tang & Li, 2010 – China
- Heriaeus convexus Tang & Li, 2010 – China
- Heriaeus copricola van Niekerk & Dippenaar-Schoeman, 2013 – Lesotho, South Africa
- Heriaeus crassispinus Lawrence, 1942 – Africa
- Heriaeus delticus Utochkin, 1985 – Russia
- Heriaeus fedotovi Charitonov, 1946 – Tajikistan, Uzbekistan
- Heriaeus foordi van Niekerk & Dippenaar-Schoeman, 2013 – South Africa
- Heriaeus graminicola (Doleschall, 1852) – Caucasus, Iran
- Heriaeus hirtus (Latreille, 1819) – Caucasus, Turkey (type species)
- Heriaeus horridus Tystshenko, 1965 – Kazakhstan, Kyrgyzstan, India, Ukraine, Russia
- Heriaeus latifrons Lessert, 1919 – Tanzania
- Heriaeus madagascar van Niekerk & Dippenaar-Schoeman, 2013 – Madagascar
- Heriaeus maurusius Loerbroks, 1983 – Morocco
- Heriaeus mellotteei Simon, 1886 – China, Japan, Korea
- Heriaeus muizenberg van Niekerk & Dippenaar-Schoeman, 2013 – South Africa
- Heriaeus numidicus Loerbroks, 1983 – Algeria, Libya, Morocco, Spain
- Heriaeus oblongus Simon, 1918 – Kazakhstan, Caucasus, Russia
- Heriaeus orientalis Simon, 1918 – Turkey, Ukraine, Greece
- Heriaeus peterwebbi van Niekerk & Dippenaar-Schoeman, 2013 – Namibia, South Africa
- Heriaeus pilosus Nosek, 1905 – Turkey
- Heriaeus setiger (O. Pickard-Cambridge, 1872) – Caucasus, Turkey, Middle East, South-eastern Europe
- Heriaeus simoni Kulczyński, 1903 – Turkey, Bulgaria, Southern Europe
- Heriaeus sossusvlei van Niekerk & Dippenaar-Schoeman, 2013 – Namibia, South Africa
- Heriaeus spinipalpus Loerbroks, 1983 – Turkmenistan, Western Asia
- Heriaeus transvaalicus Simon, 1895 – South Africa
- Heriaeus xanderi van Niekerk & Dippenaar-Schoeman, 2013 – Tanzania, South Africa
- Heriaeus xinjiangensis Liang, Zhu & Wang, 1991 – China
- Heriaeus zanii van Niekerk & Dippenaar-Schoeman, 2013 – South Africa
- Heriaeus zhalosni Komnenov, 2017 – Bulgaria, Greece, North Macedonia

In synonymy:

- H. claveatus (Walckenaer, 1837) = Heriaeus hirtus (Latreille, 1819)
- H. fimbriatus Lawrence, 1942 = Heriaeus crassispinus Lawrence, 1942
- H. kumaonensis (Tikader, 1980) = Heriaeus horridus Tyschchenko, 1965
- H. propinquus Kulczyński, 1903 = Heriaeus simoni Kulczyński, 1903
- H. sareptanus Loerbroks, 1983 = Heriaeus horridus Tyschchenko, 1965

Nomina dubia

- H. difficilis Strand, 1906
- H. melanotrichus Simon, 1903

== See also ==
- List of Thomisidae species
