= Heriaeus muizenberg =

Muizenberg Hairy Crab Spider

Scientific classification
- Kingdom: Animalia
- Phylum: Arthropoda
- Subphylum: Chelicerata
- Class: Arachnida
- Order: Araneae
- Infraorder: Araneomorphae
- Family: Thomisidae
- Genus: Heriaeus
- Species: H. muizenberg

Binomial name
- Heriaeus muizenberg van Niekerk & Dippenaar-Schoeman, 2013

Species of spider

Heriaeus muizenberg is a species of spider in the family Thomisidae. It is endemic to the Western Cape and is commonly known as the Muizenberg hairy crab spider.

== Distribution ==
Heriaeus muizenberg is known only from Muizenberg on the Cape Peninsula in the Western Cape, South Africa.

== Habitat and ecology ==
The male was collected on coastal dunes in the Fynbos biome during September and October.

== Conservation ==
The species is known only from the male, sampled in 1991 from the type locality. The only known site is under threat of development and ongoing loss of coastal dune habitat, therefore the species is listed as Critically Endangered by the South African National Biodiversity Institute. More sampling is needed.

== Etymology ==
The species is named after its type locality, Muizenberg.

== Taxonomy ==
Heriaeus muizenberg was described in 2013 and is known only from the male.
