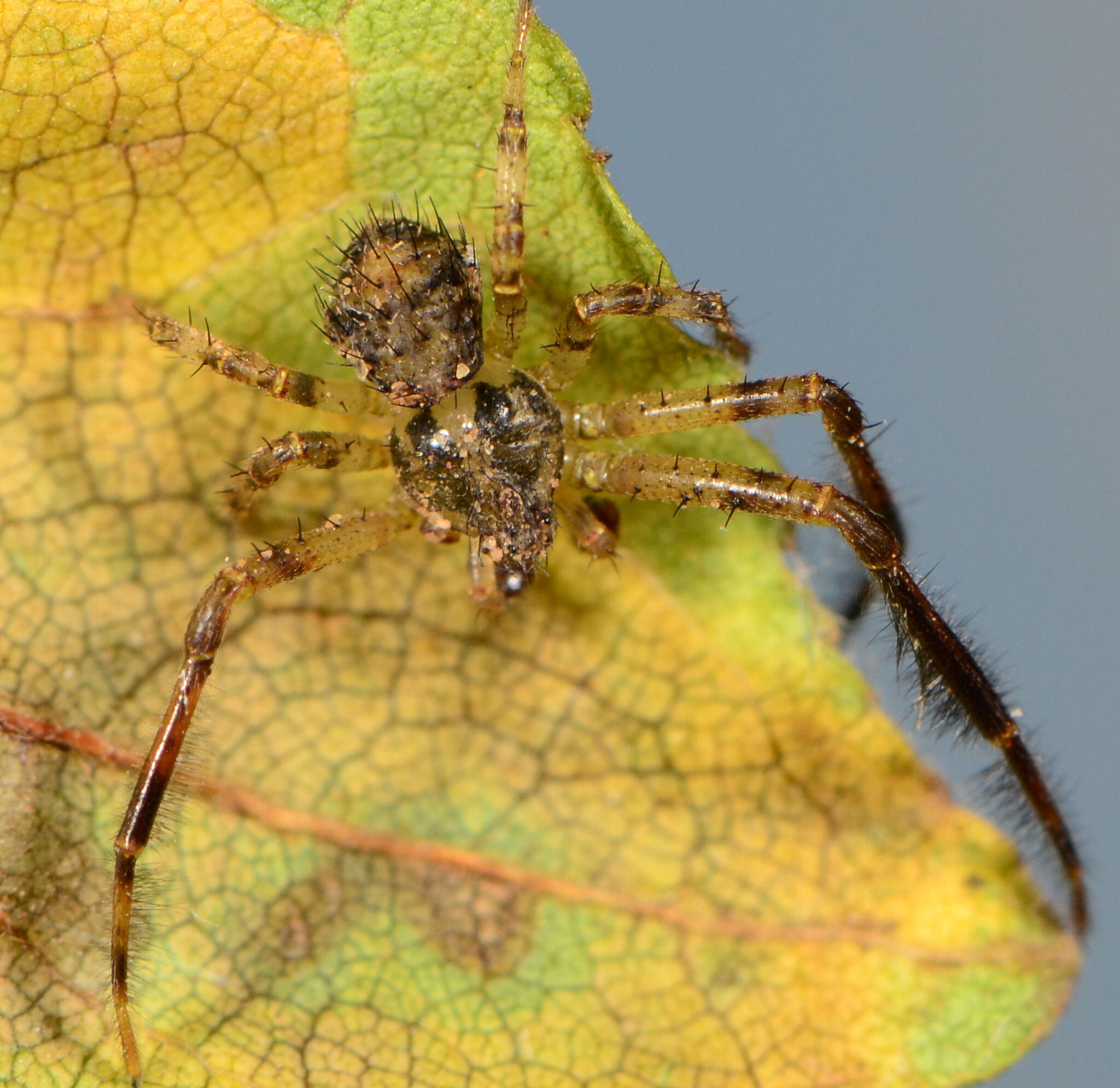
- male
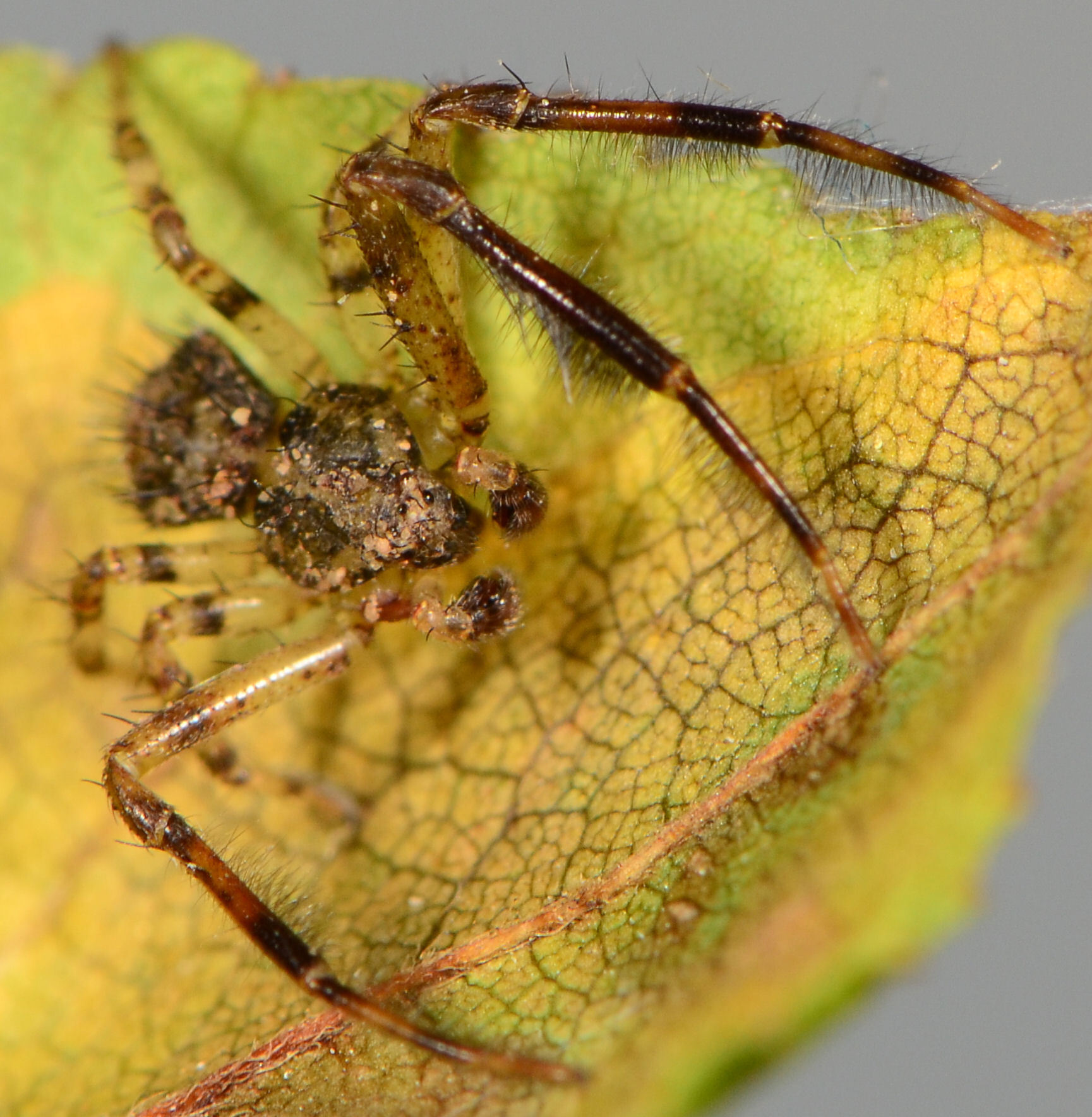
- male

Scientific classification
- Kingdom: Animalia
- Phylum: Arthropoda
- Subphylum: Chelicerata
- Class: Arachnida
- Order: Araneae
- Infraorder: Araneomorphae
- Family: Thomisidae
- Genus: Heriaeus
- Species: H. crassispinus

Binomial name
- Heriaeus crassispinus Lawrence, 1942

Synonyms
- Heriaeus fimbriatus Lawrence, 1942

= Heriaeus crassispinus =

Bushy Leg Hairy Crab Spider

Species of spider

Heriaeus crassispinus is a species of spider in the family Thomisidae. It is commonly known as the bushy leg hairy crab spider.

== Distribution ==
Heriaeus crassispinus is found in Burundi, Ethiopia, Democratic Republic of the Congo, Malawi, Rwanda, Zimbabwe, Eswatini, and South Africa.

In South Africa, it has a wide distribution found in six provinces including Eastern Cape, KwaZulu-Natal, Limpopo, Mpumalanga, North West, and Northern Cape.

== Habitat and ecology ==
This species was sampled from a variety of habitats ranging from coastal dunes, orchards, forests, palm tree forest, grassland, riverine sweet thorn and woodland at altitudes ranging from 7 to 1698 m.

It occurs in the Forest, Grassland, Indian Ocean Coastal Belt, Savanna and Thicket biomes.

== Conservation ==
Heriaeus crassispinus is protected in more than ten protected areas including Nylsvley Nature Reserve and Kruger National Park. Due to its large range, the species is listed as Least Concern by the South African National Biodiversity Institute.

== Etymology ==
The specific name is Latin for "thick-spined".

== Taxonomy ==
Heriaeus crassispinus was described by Lawrence in 1942 from Pietermaritzburg in KwaZulu-Natal. Van Niekerk and Dippenaar-Schoeman synonymized Heriaeus fimbriatus Lawrence, 1942 with this species in 2013.
