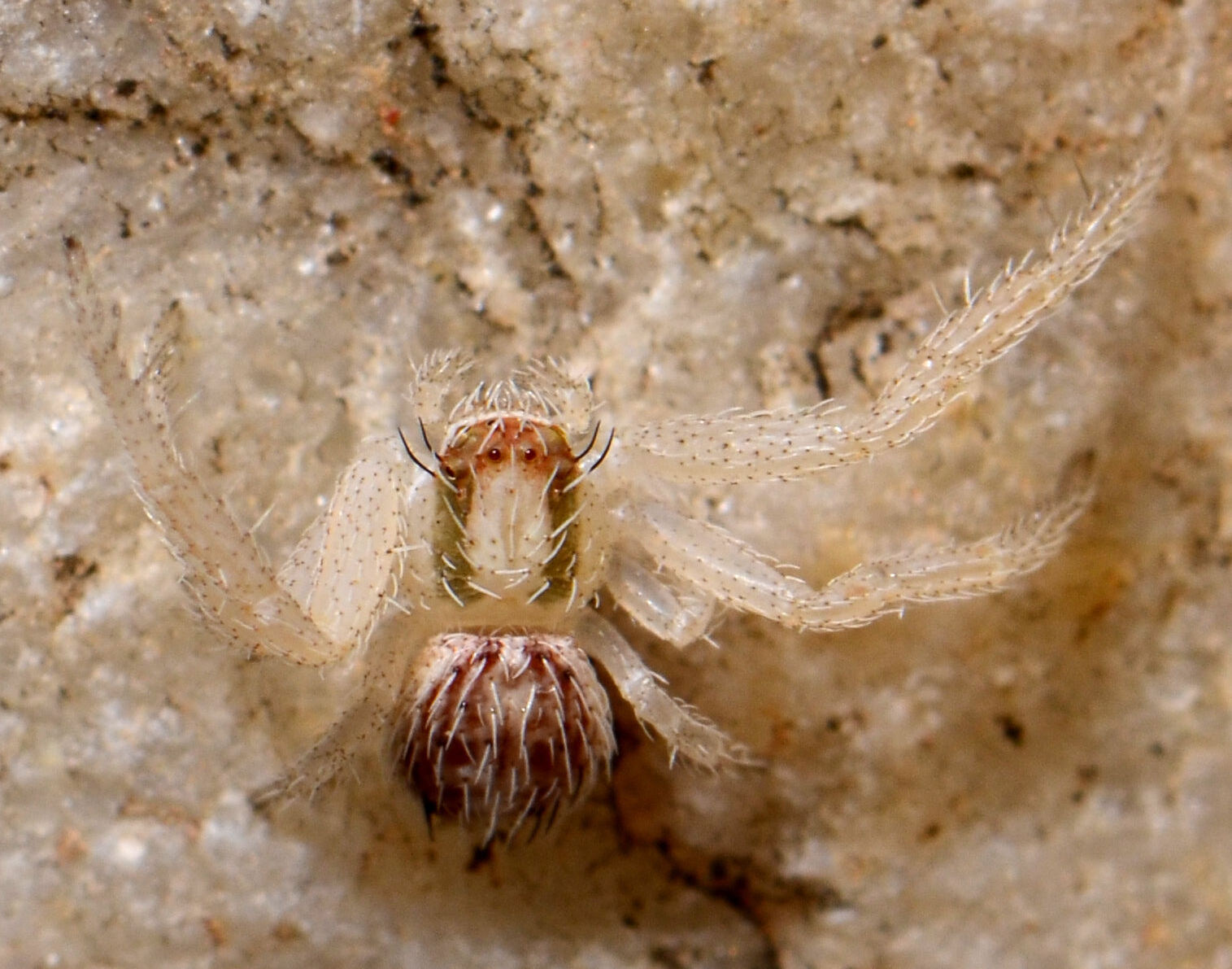
- female
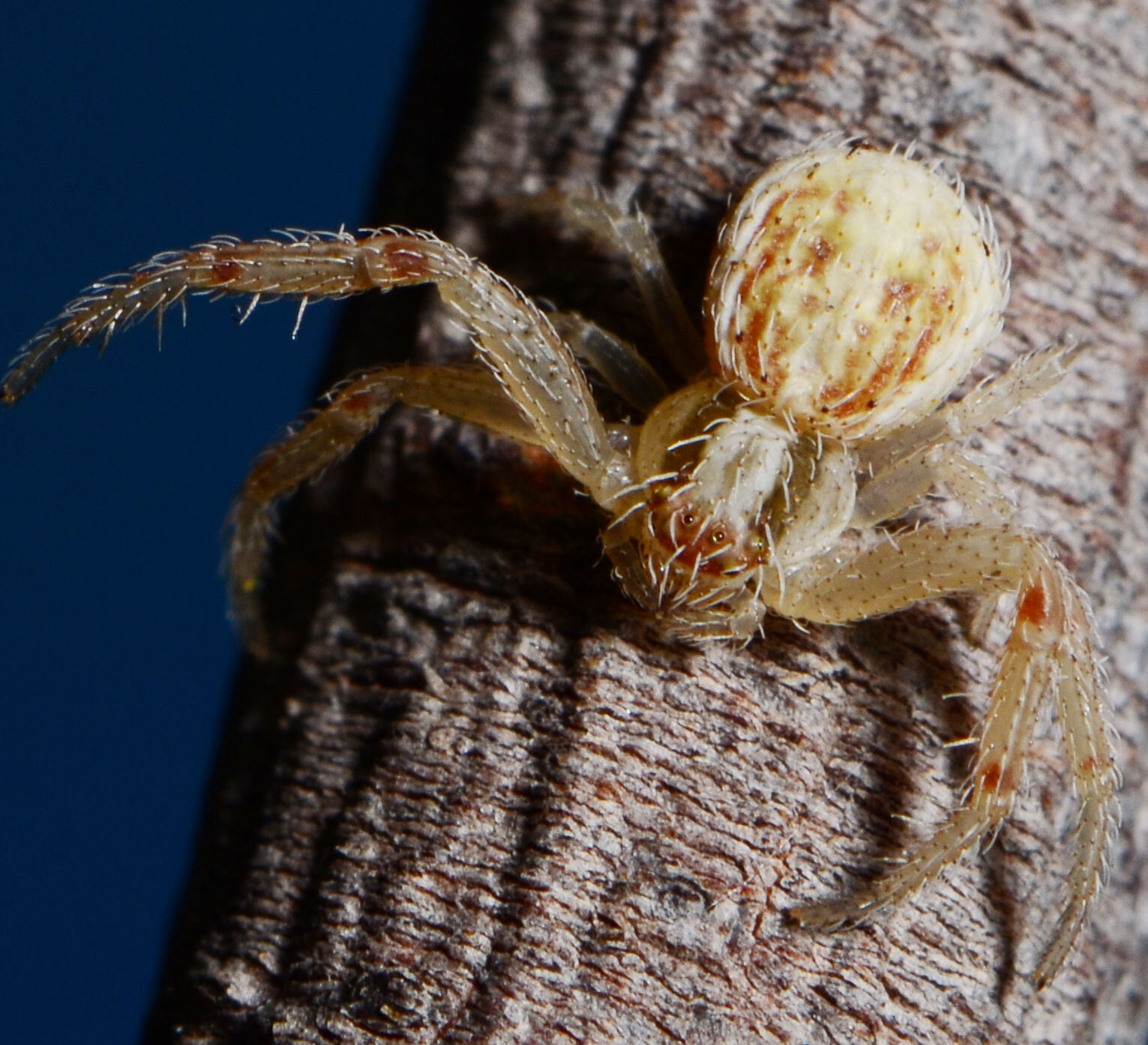
- female

Scientific classification
- Kingdom: Animalia
- Phylum: Arthropoda
- Subphylum: Chelicerata
- Class: Arachnida
- Order: Araneae
- Infraorder: Araneomorphae
- Family: Thomisidae
- Genus: Heriaeus
- Species: H. zanii

Binomial name
- Heriaeus zanii van Niekerk & Dippenaar-Schoeman, 2013

= Heriaeus zanii =

Zani's Hairy Crab Spider

Species of spider

Heriaeus zanii is a species of spider in the family Thomisidae. It is found only in South Africa, where it is known from the provinces Free State, Northern Cape, and Western Cape. It is commonly known as Zani's hairy crab spider.

== Habitat and ecology ==
This species has been collected on the ground, leaf litter and plants at altitudes ranging from 26 to 1389 m. Females were collected from August to October and males during March, September to December.

== Conservation ==
Heriaeus zanii is protected in two reserves including Tswalu Nature Reserve and Rooipoort Nature Reserve, as well as the Cederberg Wilderness Area. Due to its large range, the species is listed as Least Concern by the South African National Biodiversity Institute.

== Etymology ==
The species is named for Zani van der Walt of Oudtshoorn "for his contribution to spider research in the Western Cape".

== Taxonomy ==
Heriaeus zanii was described in 2013 from Vanrhynsdorp in the Western Cape by van Niekerk and Dippenaar-Schoeman.
