= Heriaeus peterwebbi =

Peter's Hairy Crab Spider

Scientific classification
- Kingdom: Animalia
- Phylum: Arthropoda
- Subphylum: Chelicerata
- Class: Arachnida
- Order: Araneae
- Infraorder: Araneomorphae
- Family: Thomisidae
- Genus: Heriaeus
- Species: H. peterwebbi

Binomial name
- Heriaeus peterwebbi van Niekerk & Dippenaar-Schoeman, 2013

Species of spider

Heriaeus peterwebbi is a species of spider in the family Thomisidae. It is commonly known as Peter's hairy crab spider.

== Distribution ==
Heriaeus peterwebbi is found in Namibia and South Africa.

In South Africa, it has a wide distribution throughout five provinces including Free State, Gauteng, Limpopo, North West, and Mpumalanga.

== Habitat and ecology ==
This species was collected from the ground as well as plants, such as grasses, thorn trees and crops such as cotton and strawberries, at altitudes ranging from 816 to 1457 m. Sampled from the Savanna and Grassland biomes.

== Conservation ==
Heriaeus peterwebbi is protected in four protected areas including Roodeplaat Dam Nature Reserve, Blouberg Nature Reserve, Polokwane Nature Reserve, and Lhuvhondo Nature Reserve. Due to its large range, the species is listed as Least Concern by the South African National Biodiversity Institute.

== Etymology ==
The species is named after photographer Peter Webb "for his contributions photographing South African spiders for the SANSA Virtual Museum".

== Taxonomy ==
Heriaeus peterwebbi was described in 2013 from Blouberg Nature Reserve in Limpopo by van Niekerk and Dippenaar-Schoeman.
