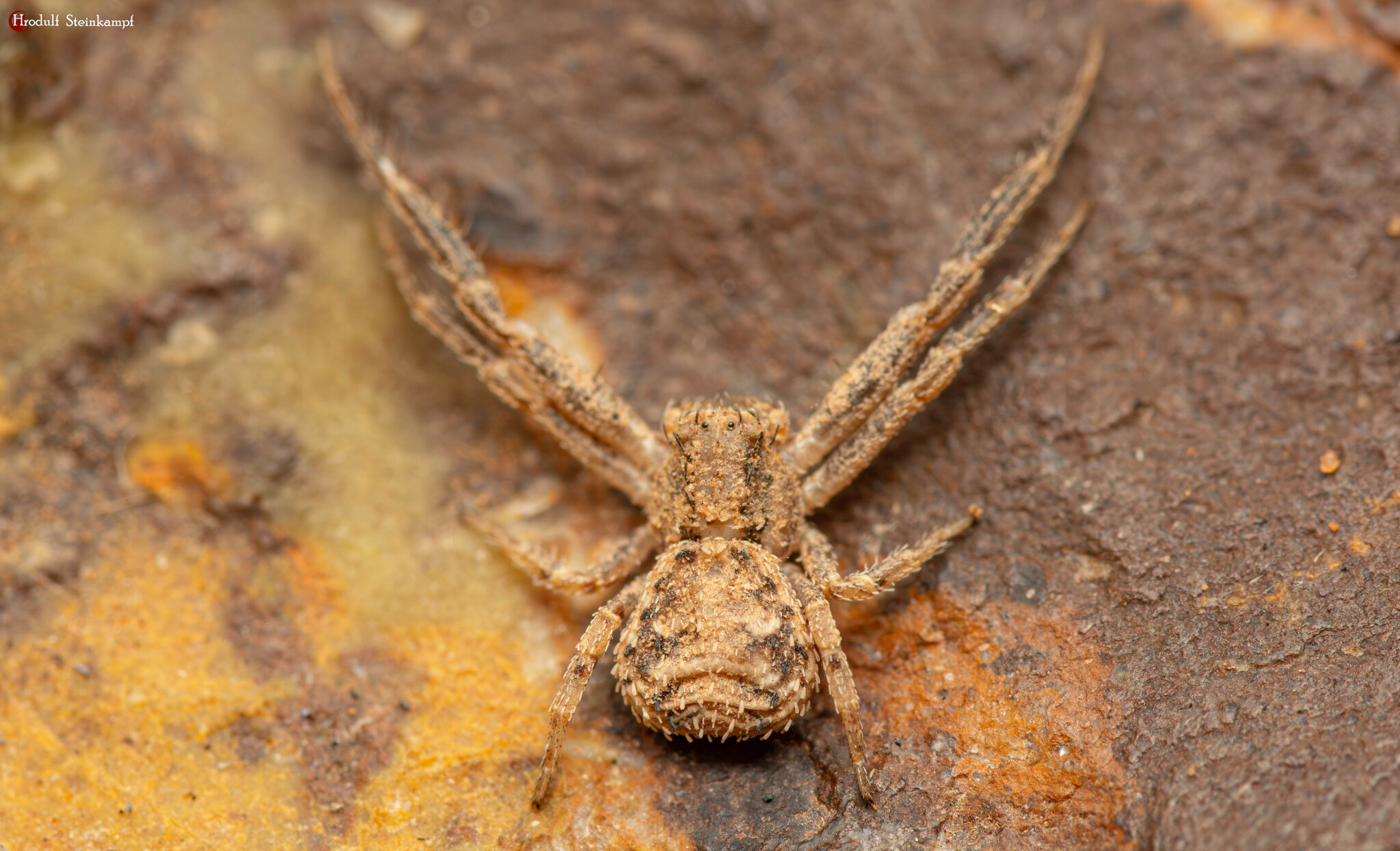
- female
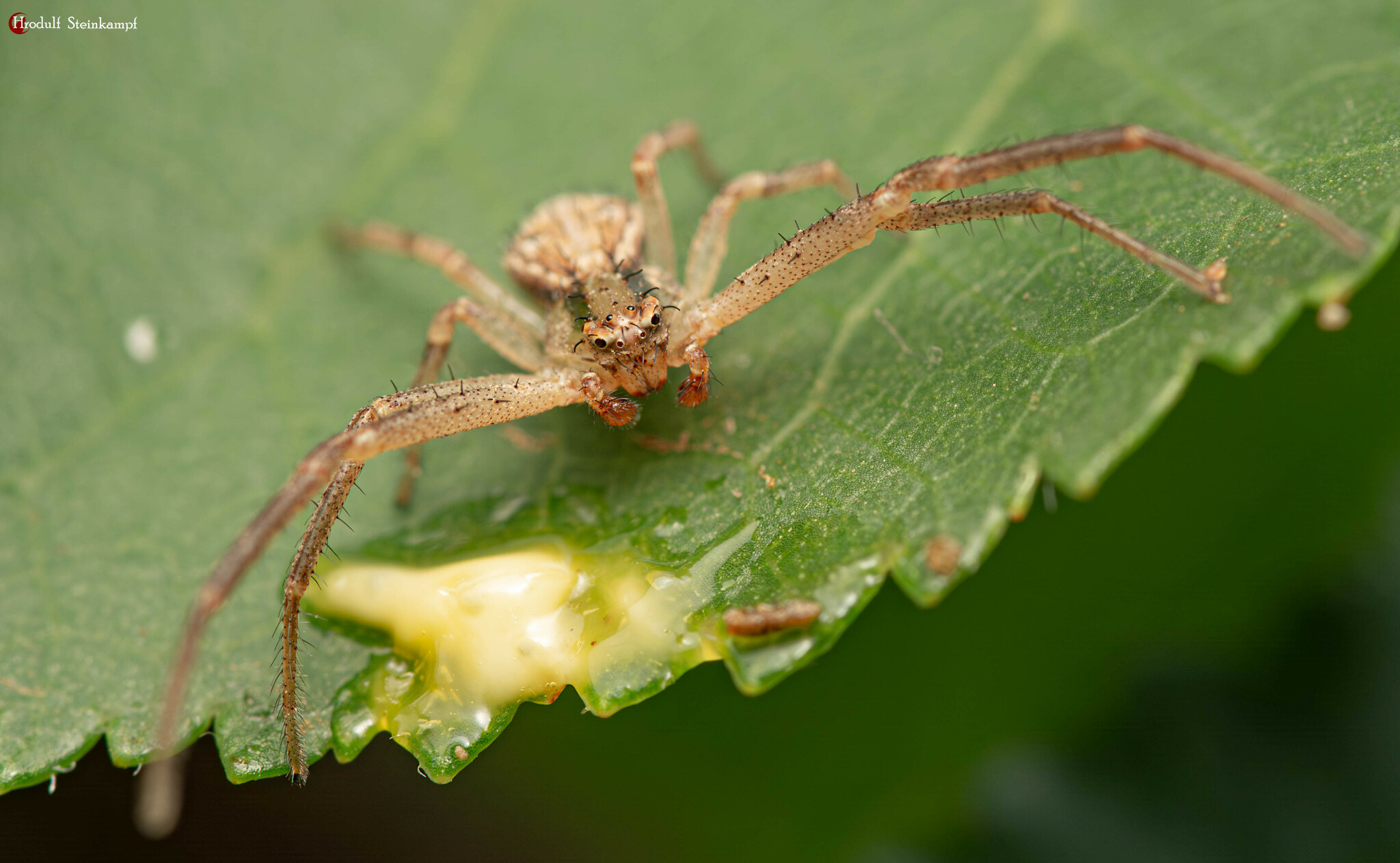
- male

Scientific classification
- Kingdom: Animalia
- Phylum: Arthropoda
- Subphylum: Chelicerata
- Class: Arachnida
- Order: Araneae
- Infraorder: Araneomorphae
- Family: Thomisidae
- Genus: Heriaeus
- Species: H. allenjonesi

Binomial name
- Heriaeus allenjonesi van Niekerk & Dippenaar-Schoeman, 2013

= Heriaeus allenjonesi =

Allen's Hairy Crab Spider

Species of spider

Heriaeus allenjonesi is a species of spider in the family Thomisidae. It is endemic to South Africa and is commonly known as Allen's hairy crab spider.

== Distribution ==
Heriaeus allenjonesi is found only in South Africa.

In South Africa, it is known from the provinces Free State, Northern Cape, and Western Cape.

== Habitat and ecology ==
Most specimens have been sampled from the Grassland and Fynbos biomes with pitfall traps from the soil surface at altitudes ranging from 582 to 1399 m. The species has been collected from a variety of habitats ranging from rocky hillsides and gravel plains to the shore of a dam, while some were sampled by sweeping grassland.

== Description ==
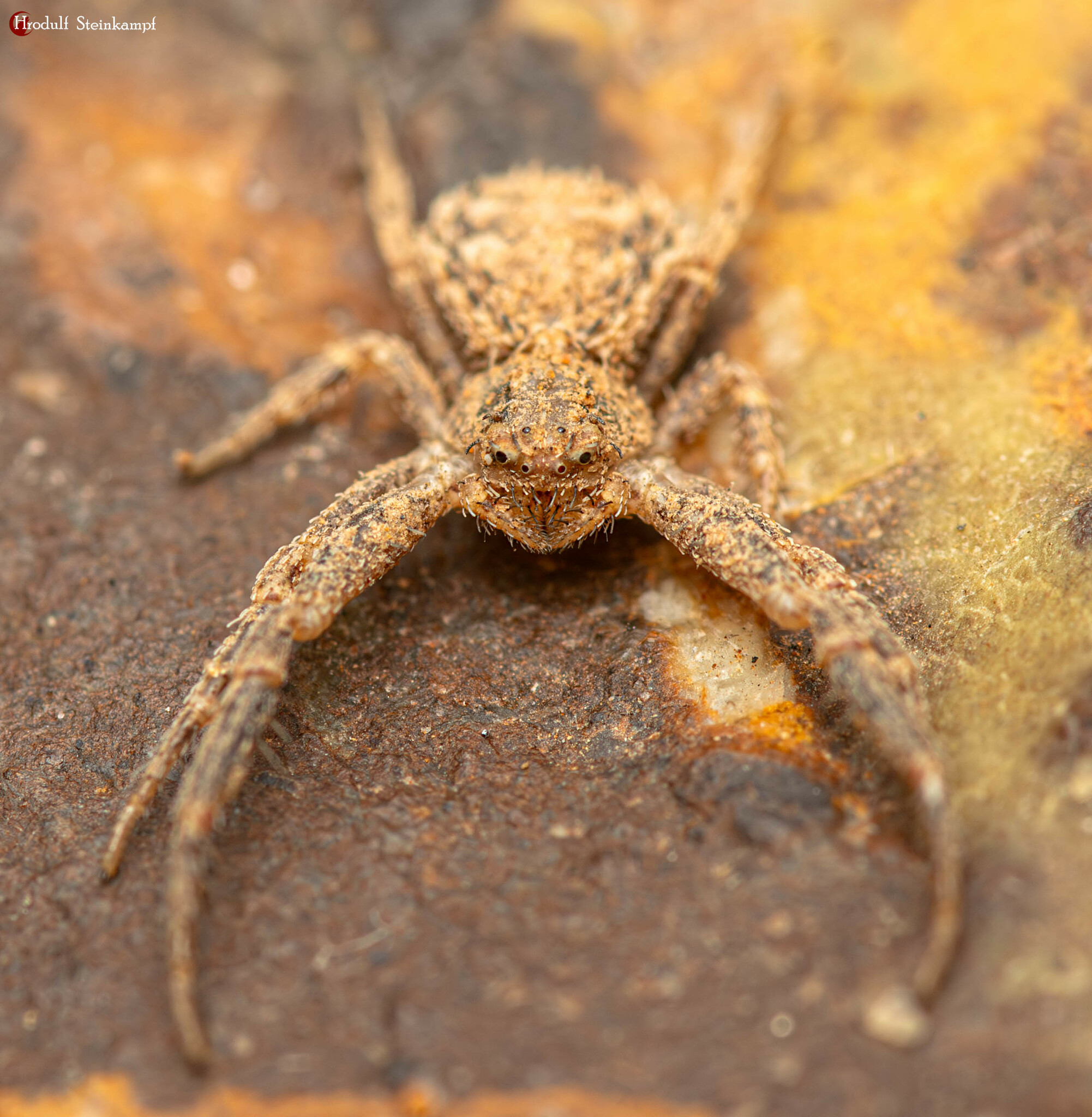
female

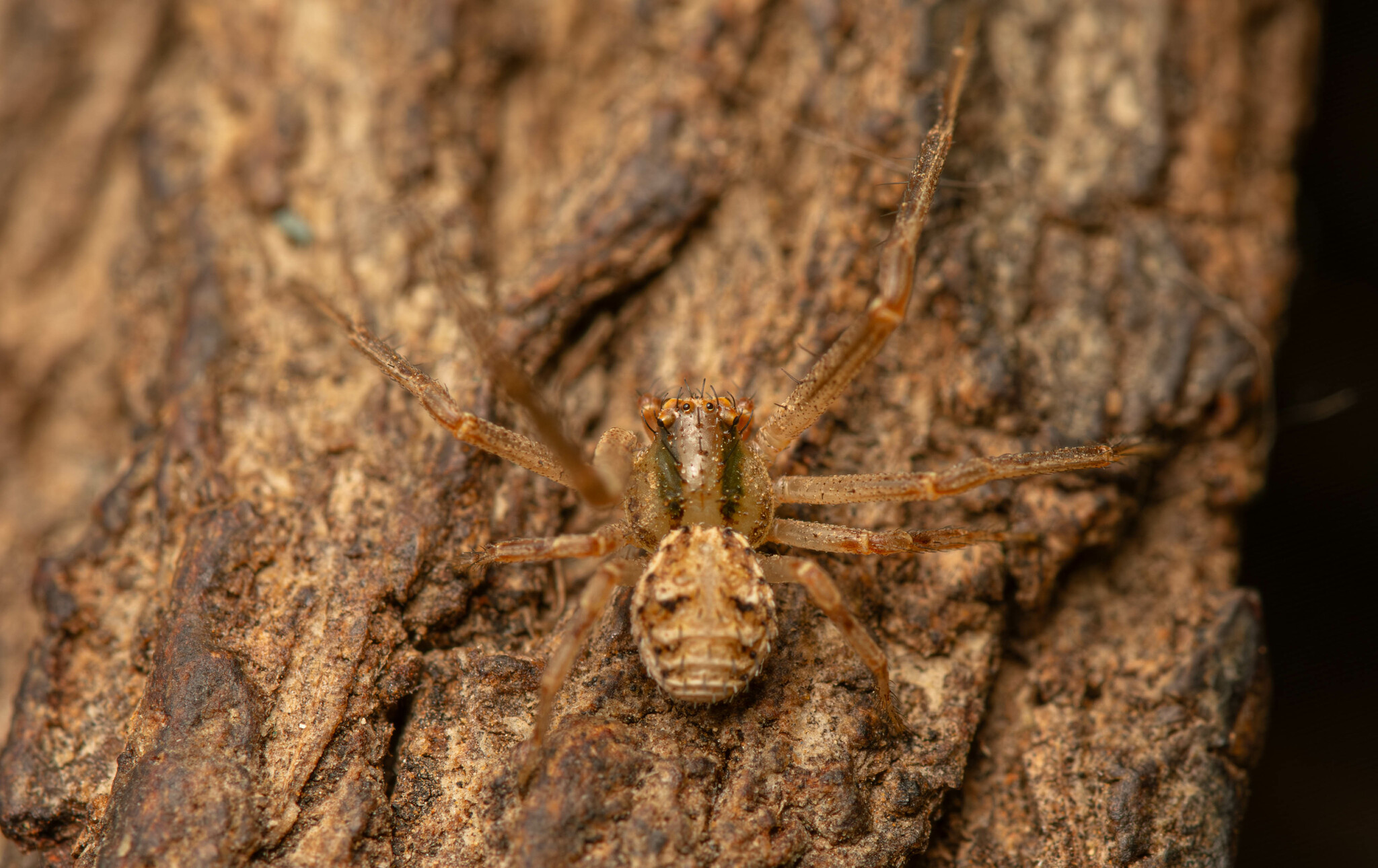
male

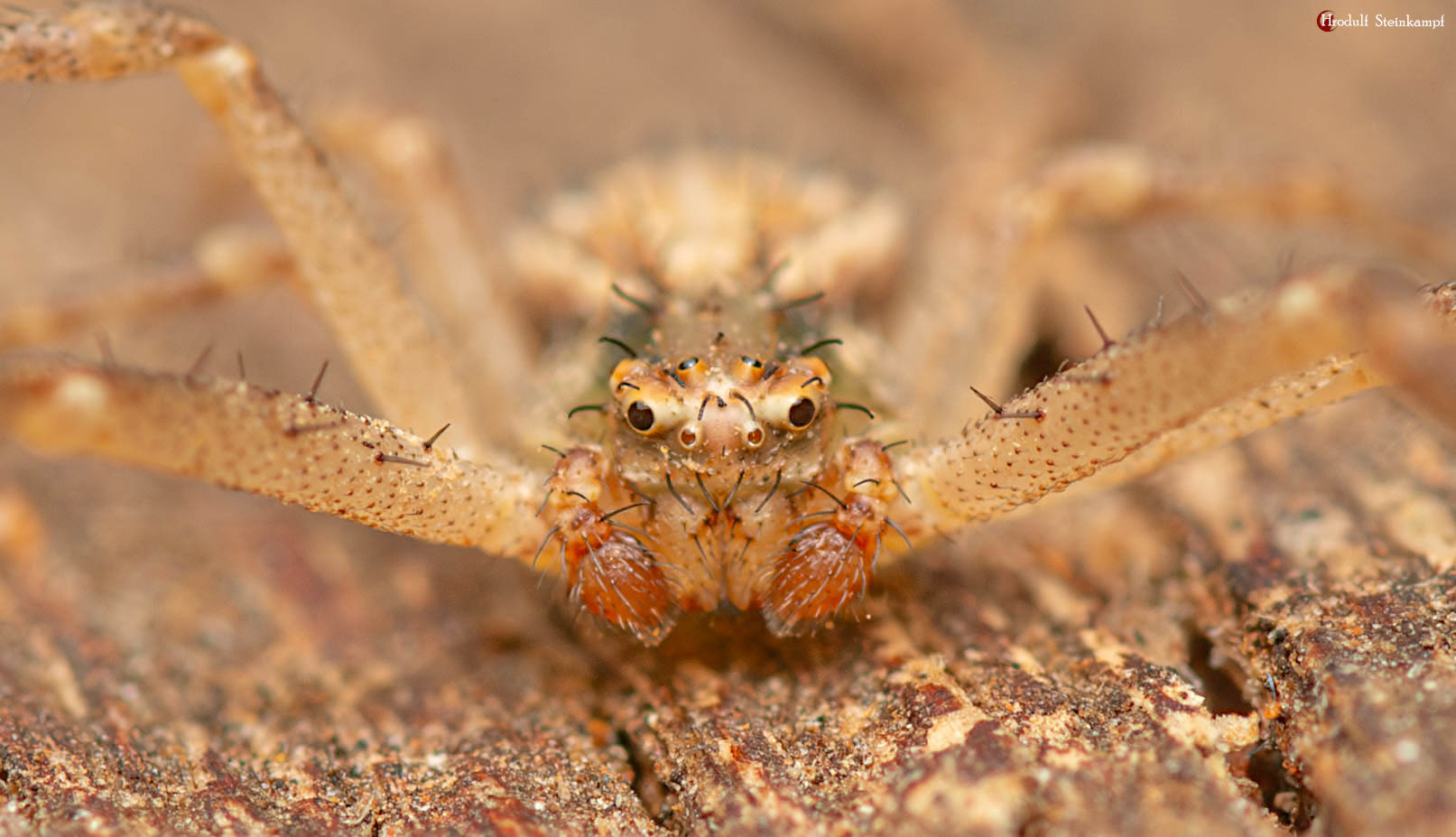
male

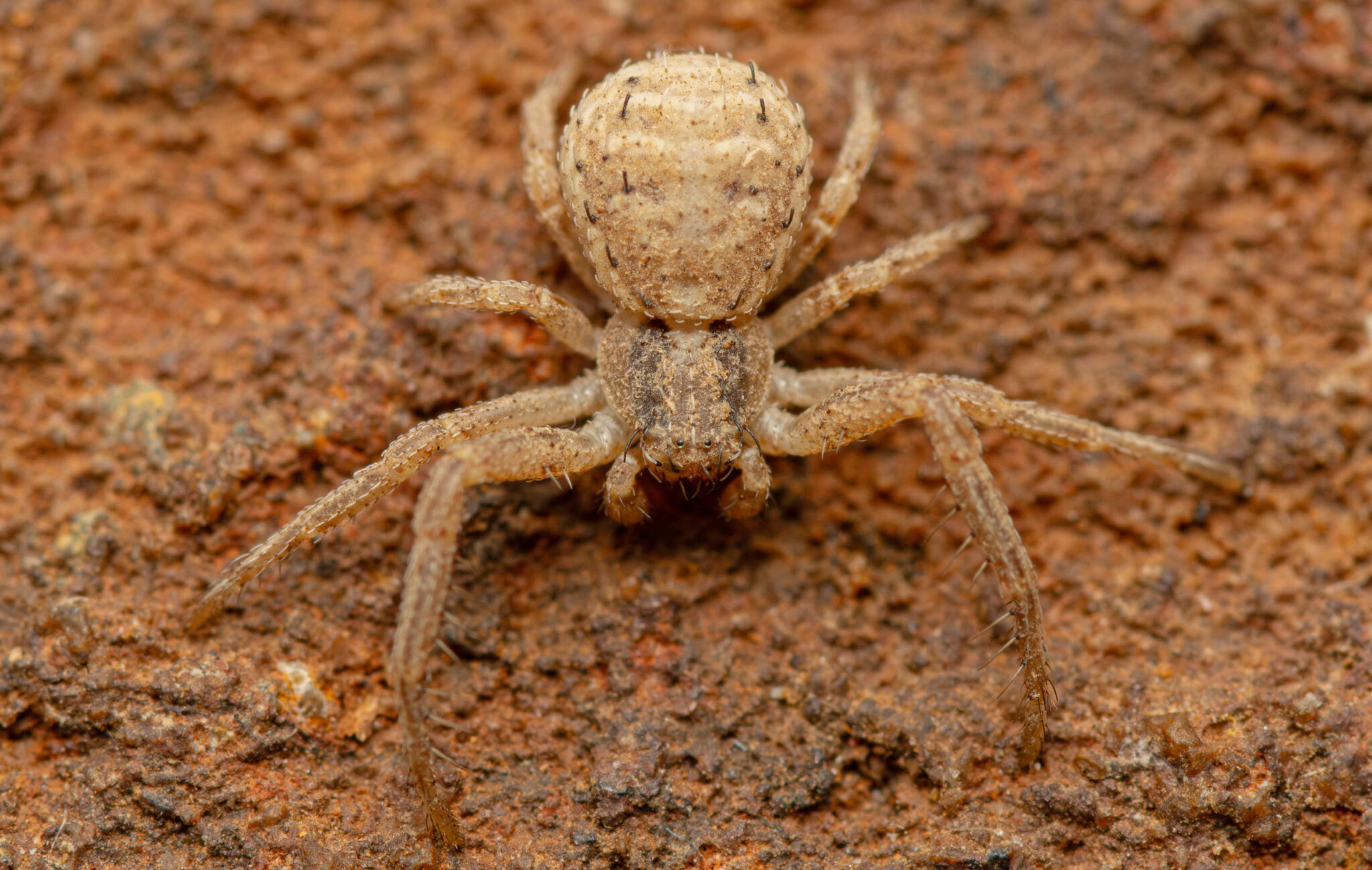
juvenile male

== Conservation ==
Heriaeus allenjonesi is protected in two reserves: Benfontein Nature Reserve and Erfenis Dam Nature Reserve. Due to its large range, the species is listed as Least Concern by the South African National Biodiversity Institute.

== Etymology ==
The species is "named for Allen Jones of Mpetsane Conservation Estate in the Free State, in recognition of his contribution of spider photos to the South African National Survey of Arachnida Virtual Museum".

== Taxonomy ==
Heriaeus allenjonesi was described in 2013 from Bloemfontein by van Niekerk and Dippenaar-Schoeman.
