= Heriaeus xanderi =

Xander's Hairy Crab Spider

Scientific classification
- Kingdom: Animalia
- Phylum: Arthropoda
- Subphylum: Chelicerata
- Class: Arachnida
- Order: Araneae
- Infraorder: Araneomorphae
- Family: Thomisidae
- Genus: Heriaeus
- Species: H. xanderi

Binomial name
- Heriaeus xanderi van Niekerk & Dippenaar-Schoeman, 2013

Species of spider

Heriaeus xanderi is a species of spider in the family Thomisidae. It is commonly known as Xander's hairy crab spider.

== Distribution ==
Heriaeus xanderi is found in Tanzania and South Africa.

In South Africa, it is known from two provinces including KwaZulu-Natal and Mpumalanga. This species is undercollected and is suspected to occur in more African countries.

== Habitat and ecology ==
Heriaeus xanderi has been collected on grass and trees in the Savanna biome at altitudes ranging from 83 to 469 m. Females were collected in April, July, November and December and males in September and November.

== Conservation ==
Heriaeus xanderi is protected in two reserves including Mkhuze Game Reserve and Hluhluwe Nature Reserve. Due to its large range, the species is listed as Least Concern by the South African National Biodiversity Institute.

== Etymology ==
The species is named for Xander Combrink, "who has made an important contribution in sampling spiders in KwaZulu-Natal".

== Taxonomy ==
Heriaeus xanderi was described in 2013 from Tanzania by van Niekerk and Dippenaar-Schoeman.
