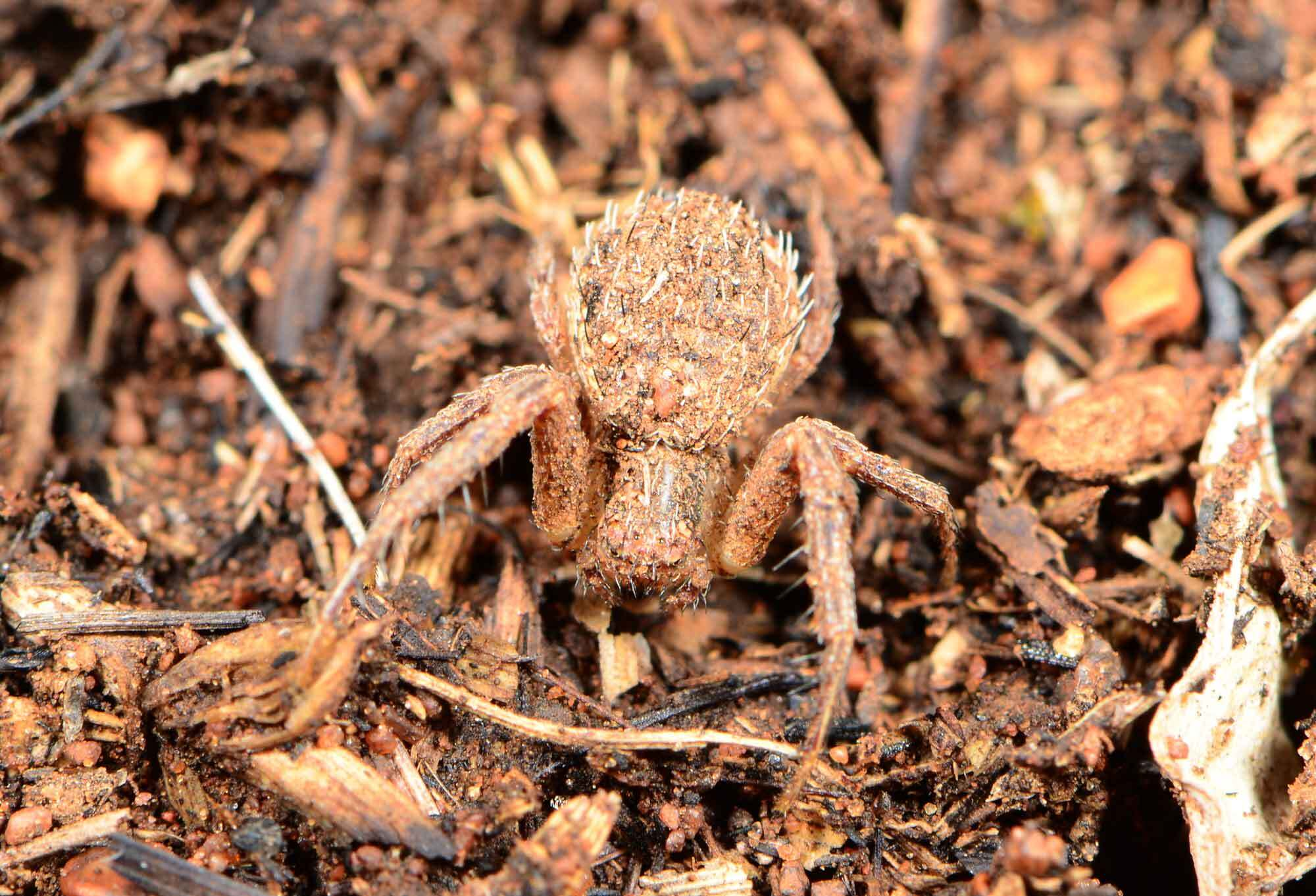
- female
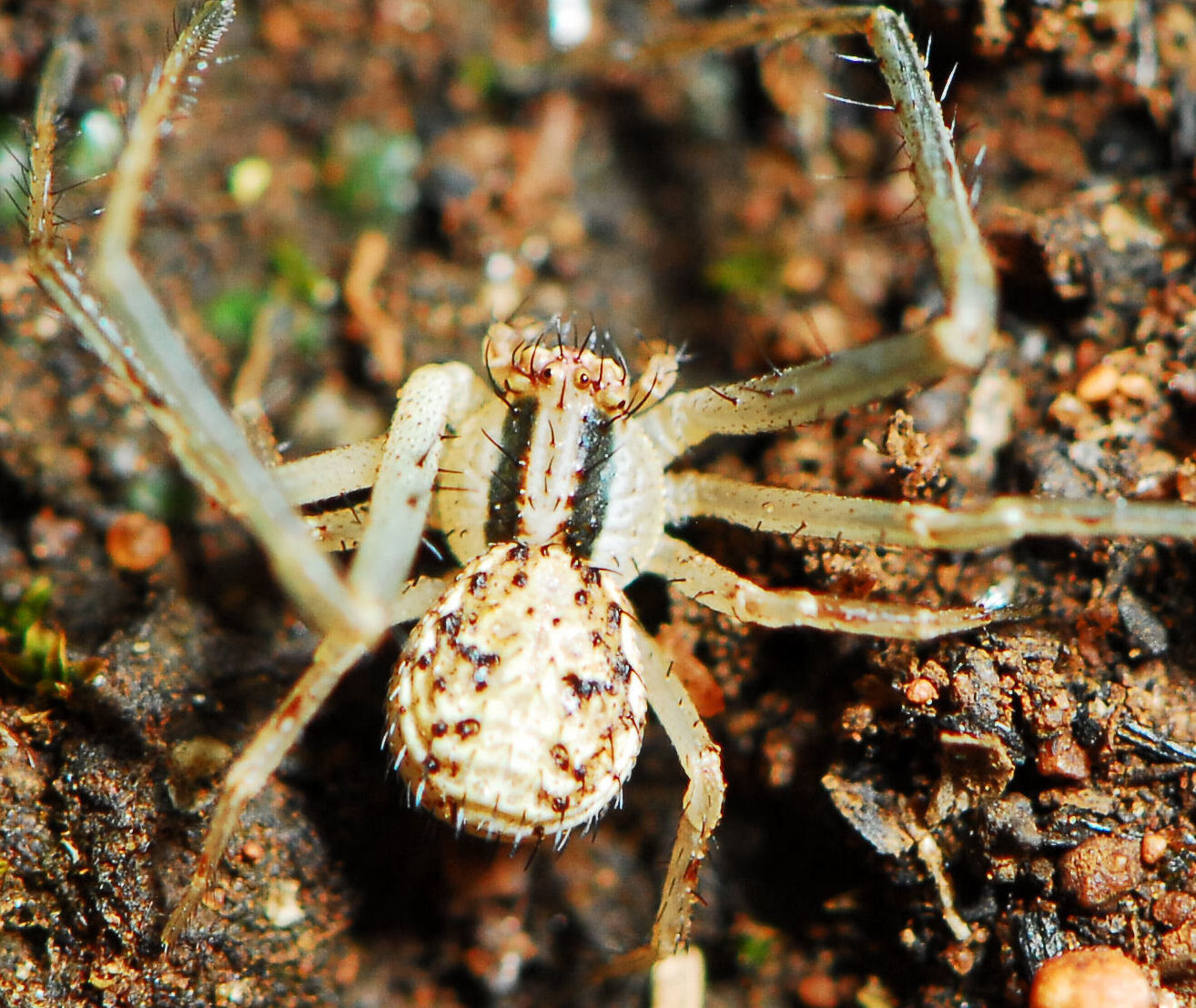
- female

Scientific classification
- Kingdom: Animalia
- Phylum: Arthropoda
- Subphylum: Chelicerata
- Class: Arachnida
- Order: Araneae
- Infraorder: Araneomorphae
- Family: Thomisidae
- Genus: Heriaeus
- Species: H. copricola

Binomial name
- Heriaeus copricola van Niekerk & Dippenaar-Schoeman, 2013

= Heriaeus copricola =

Ground Hairy Crab Spider

Species of spider

Heriaeus copricola is a species of spider in the family Thomisidae. It is commonly known as the ground hairy crab spider.

== Distribution ==
Heriaeus copricola is found in Lesotho and South Africa.

In South Africa, it is known from the provinces Gauteng, KwaZulu-Natal, Limpopo, and Mpumalanga.

== Habitat and ecology ==
Most specimens were collected with pitfall traps in the Grassland and Savanna biomes at altitudes ranging from 418 to 2066 m. Heriaeus copricola was commonly sampled in Irene on the ground surface in grassland.

== Description ==
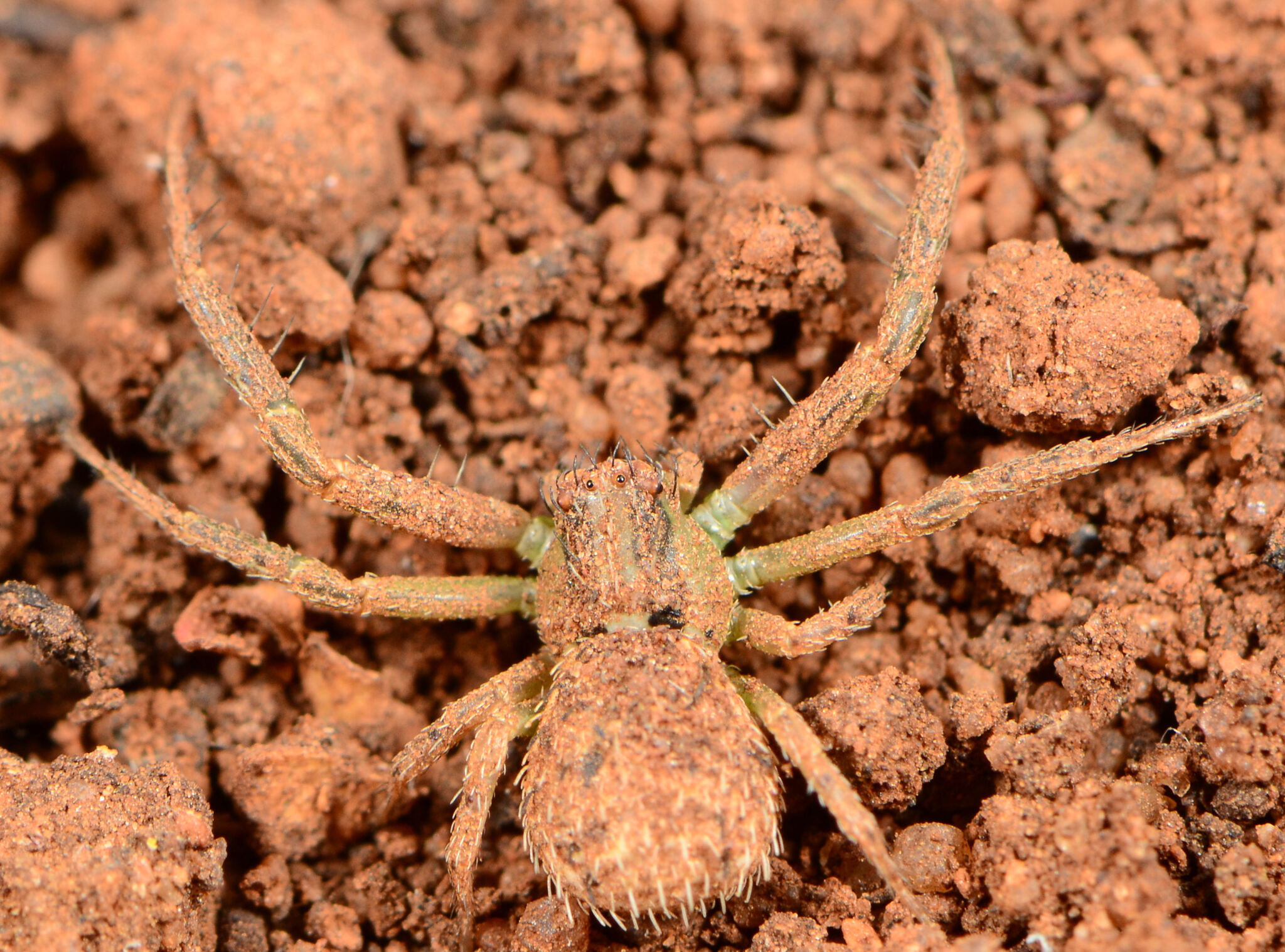
female

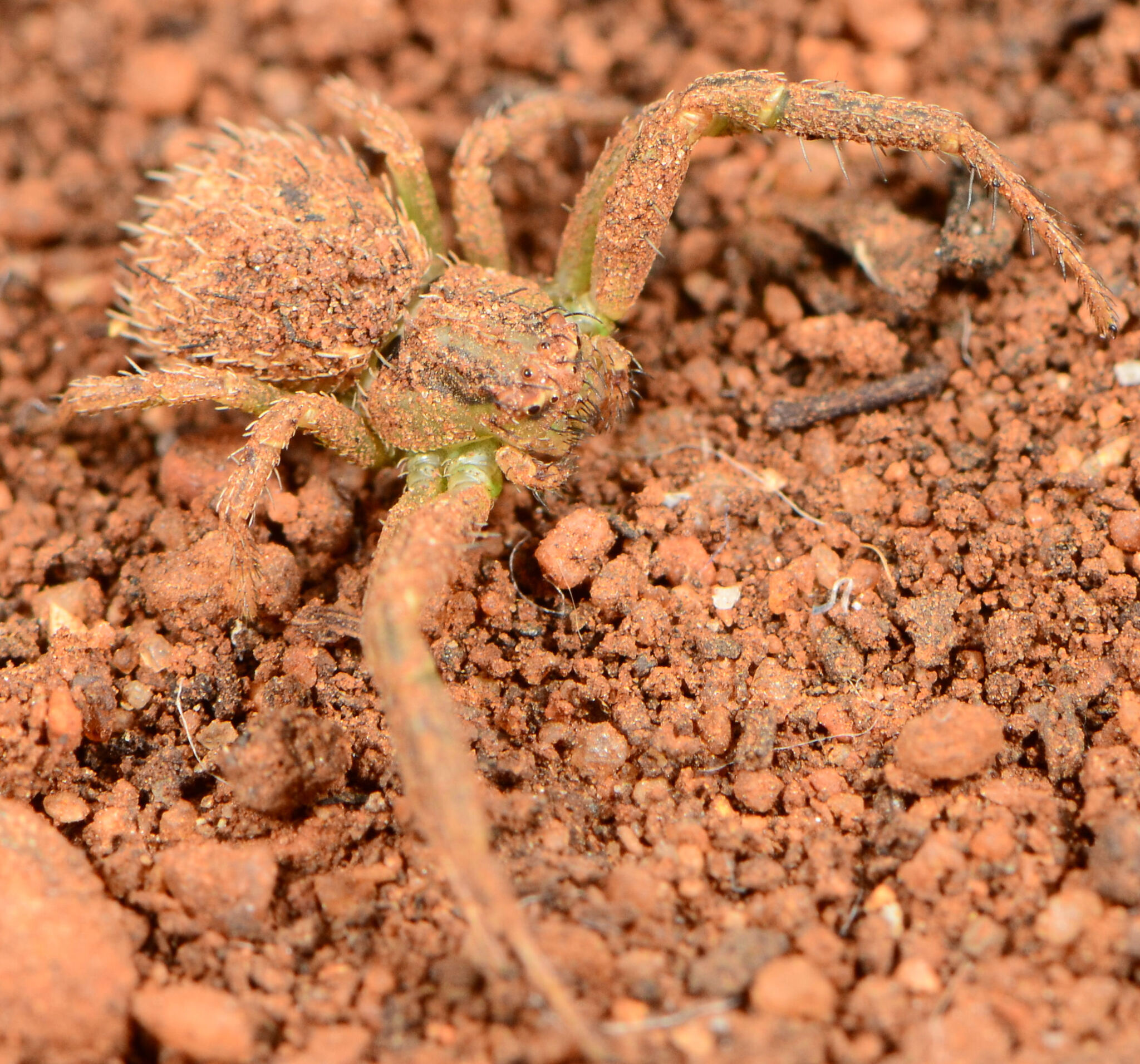
female

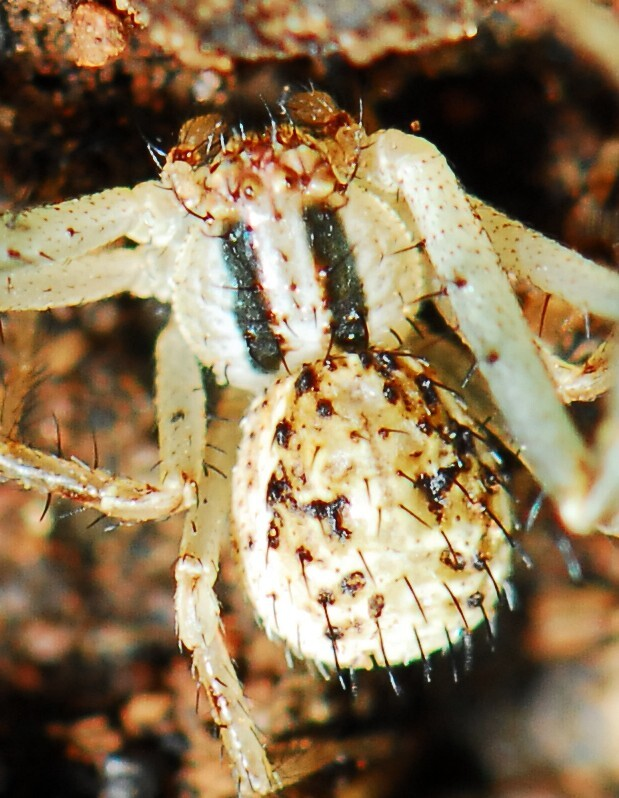
female

== Conservation ==
Heriaeus copricola is protected in four reserves including Isandlwane Nature Reserve, Polokwane Nature Reserve, Mogalakwena Nature Reserve and Kruger National Park. Due to its large range, the species is listed as Least Concern by the South African National Biodiversity Institute.

== Etymology ==
The specific name is derived from Latin copros (dung) and colere (to dwell in).

== Taxonomy ==
Heriaeus copricola was described in 2013 from Pietermaritzburg in KwaZulu-Natal by van Niekerk and Dippenaar-Schoeman.
