= Heriaeus transvaalicus =

Transvaal Hairy Crab Spider

Scientific classification
- Kingdom: Animalia
- Phylum: Arthropoda
- Subphylum: Chelicerata
- Class: Arachnida
- Order: Araneae
- Infraorder: Araneomorphae
- Family: Thomisidae
- Genus: Heriaeus
- Species: H. transvaalicus

Binomial name
- Heriaeus transvaalicus Simon, 1895

Species of spider

Heriaeus transvaalicus is a species of spider in the family Thomisidae. It is endemic to South Africa and is commonly known as the Transvaal hairy crab spider.

== Distribution ==
Heriaeus transvaalicus is found only in South Africa, where it is known from Limpopo and North West.

== Habitat and ecology ==
All specimens were collected by sweeping grassland, false grassland, woodland and open savanna at altitudes ranging from 894 to 1556 m. Females were collected from January to May and adult males in March.

== Conservation ==
Heriaeus transvaalicus is protected in three reserves including Polokwane Nature Reserve, Blouberg Nature Reserve, and Rustenburg Nature Reserve. Due to its large range, the species is listed as Least Concern by the South African National Biodiversity Institute.

== Taxonomy ==
Heriaeus transvaalicus was described by Simon in 1895 from Makapan in Limpopo. It was revised in 2013.
