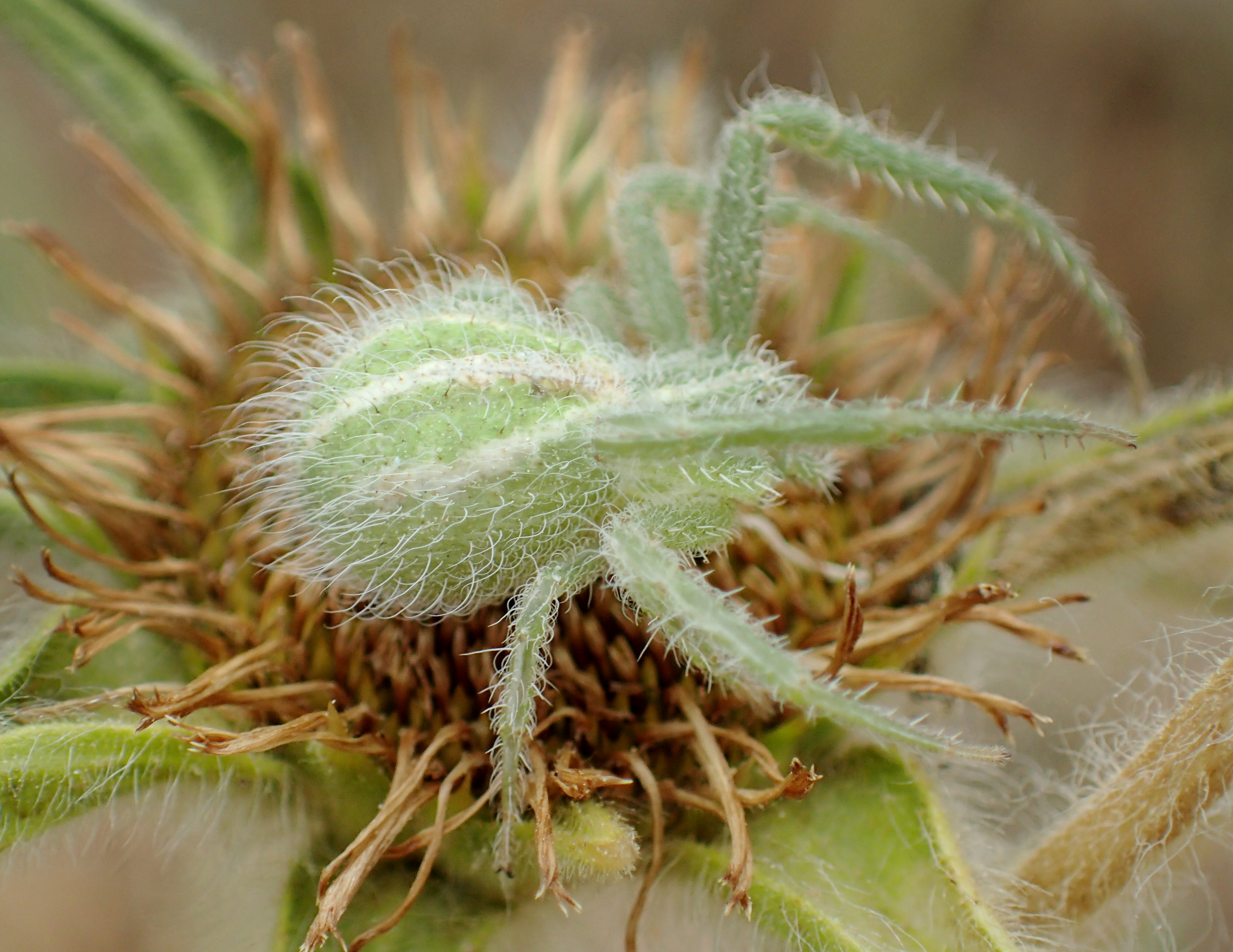
- Heriaeus melloteei in Greece

Scientific classification
- Kingdom: Animalia
- Phylum: Arthropoda
- Subphylum: Chelicerata
- Class: Arachnida
- Order: Araneae
- Infraorder: Araneomorphae
- Family: Thomisidae
- Genus: Heriaeus
- Species: H. melloteei

Binomial name
- Heriaeus melloteei Simon, 1886

Synonyms
- Heriaeus oblongus

= Heriaeus melloteei =

Species of spider

Heriaeus melloteei (also known as Heriaeus oblongus) is a species of crab spider.

Some peptide toxin isolates from the venom of H. melloteei, including those coined Hm-1, Hm-2, and Hm-3, have been shown to inhibit voltage-gated sodium channels in humans. The action of Hm-3 in particular, which principally targets the Na_{v}1.4 channel, has led some researchers to propose investigating its applicability in hypokalemic periodic paralysis treatments.
