= Sparassus argelasius =

Sparassus argelasius is a synonym of:

- Eusparassus dufouri, a huntsman spider found in the Western Mediterranean Basin
- Olios argelasius, a huntsman spider found in the Mediterranean Basin
