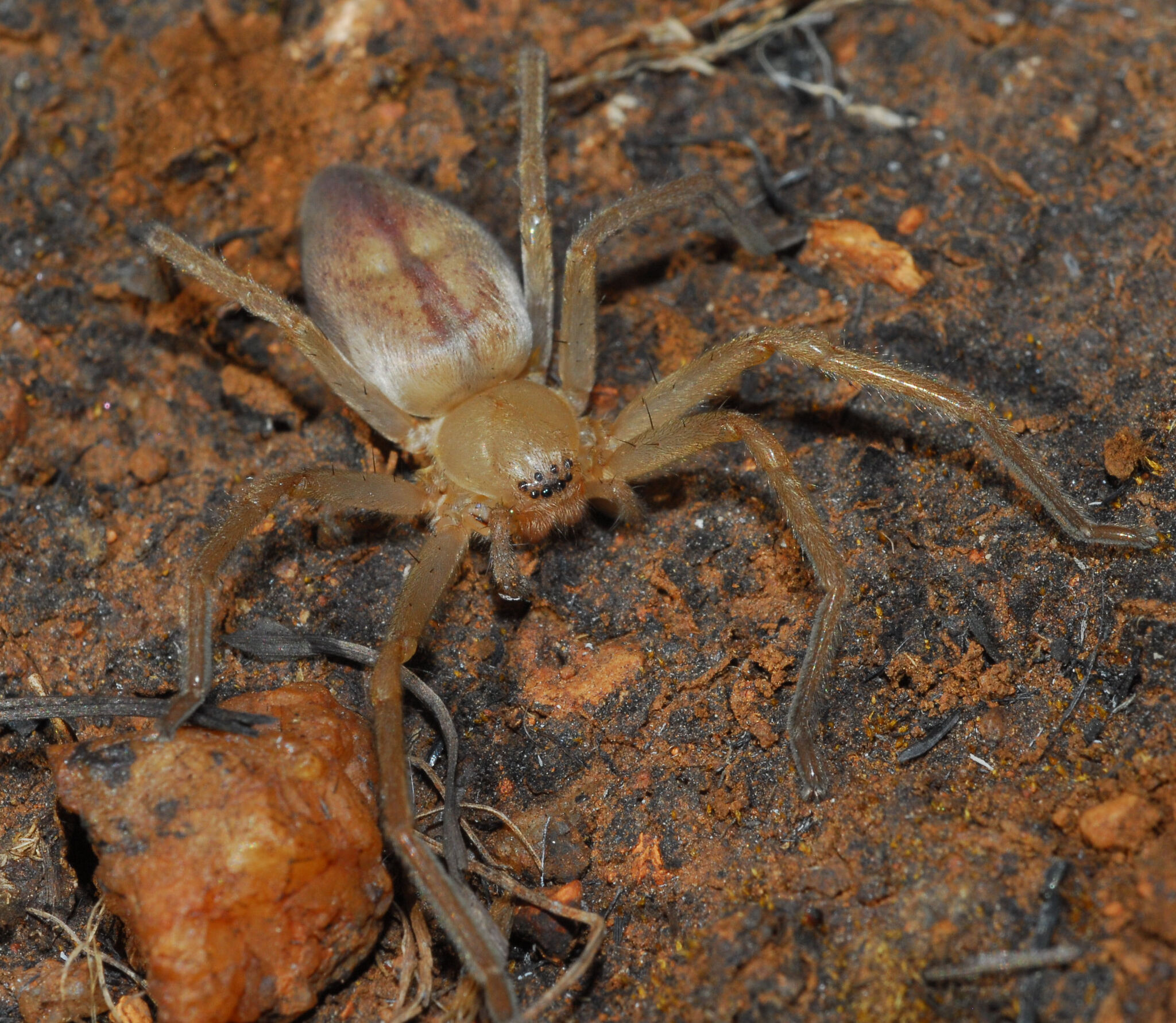
- Female

Scientific classification
- Kingdom: Animalia
- Phylum: Arthropoda
- Subphylum: Chelicerata
- Class: Arachnida
- Order: Araneae
- Infraorder: Araneomorphae
- Family: Sparassidae
- Genus: Eusparassus
- Species: E. jaegeri

Binomial name
- Eusparassus jaegeri Moradmand, 2013

= Eusparassus jaegeri =

Pretoria Stone Huntsman Spider

Species of spider

Eusparassus jaegeri is a species of spider in the family Sparassidae. It is found in Botswana and South Africa and is commonly known as the Pretoria stone huntsman spider.

== Distribution ==
Eusparassus jaegeri is distributed across five South African provinces, Gauteng, KwaZulu-Natal, Limpopo, Mpumalanga, North West, and Northern Cape. The species is also known from Botswana. Notable locations include areas around Pretoria, Kruger National Park, Ndumo Game Reserve, and various nature reserves.

== Habitat and ecology ==
The species inhabits Grassland and Savanna biomes at elevations ranging from 47 to 1,444 m above sea level. These are free-living nocturnal spiders that during the day hide in silk retreats made on the underside of stones or in crevices of rocks.

== Description ==
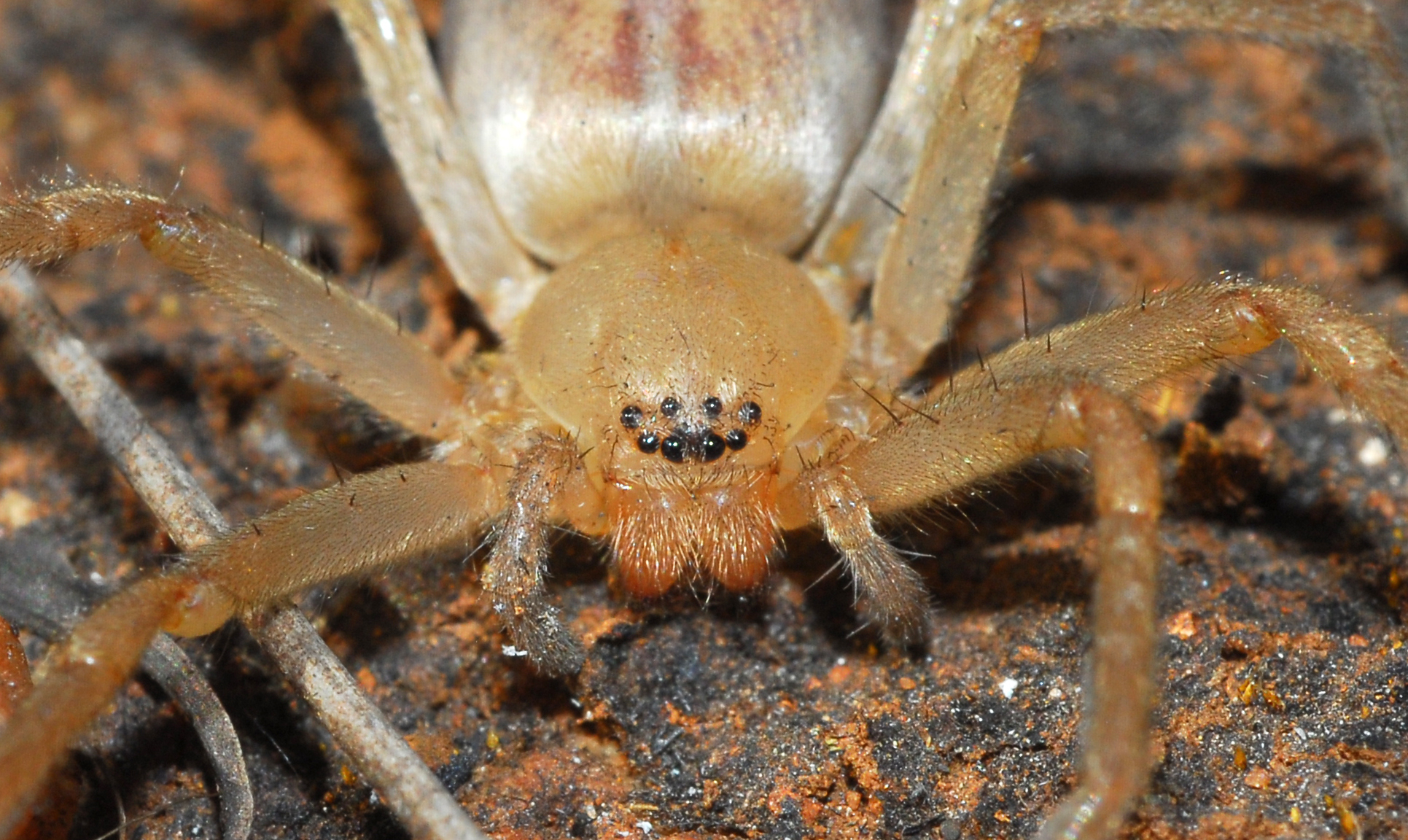
female

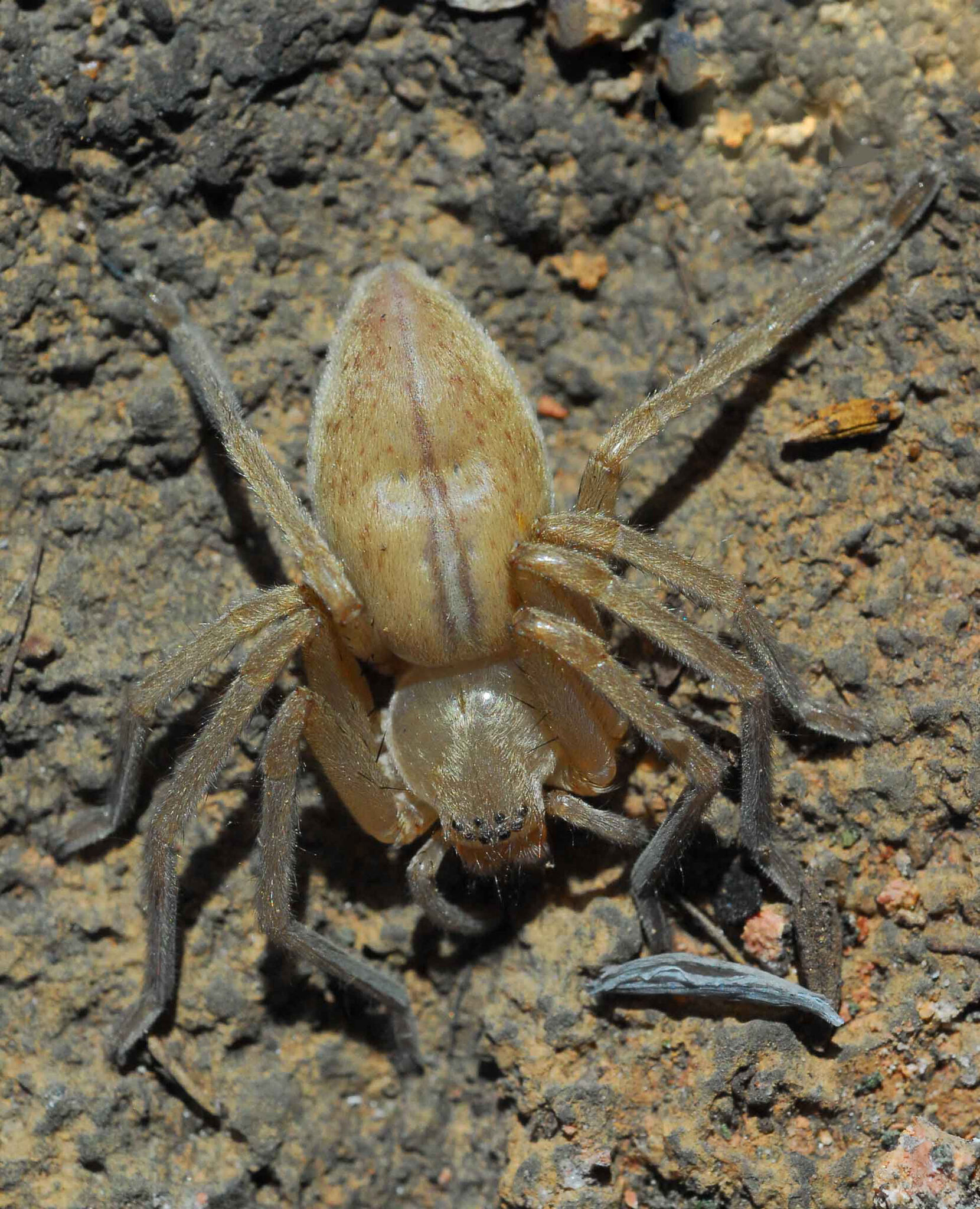
female

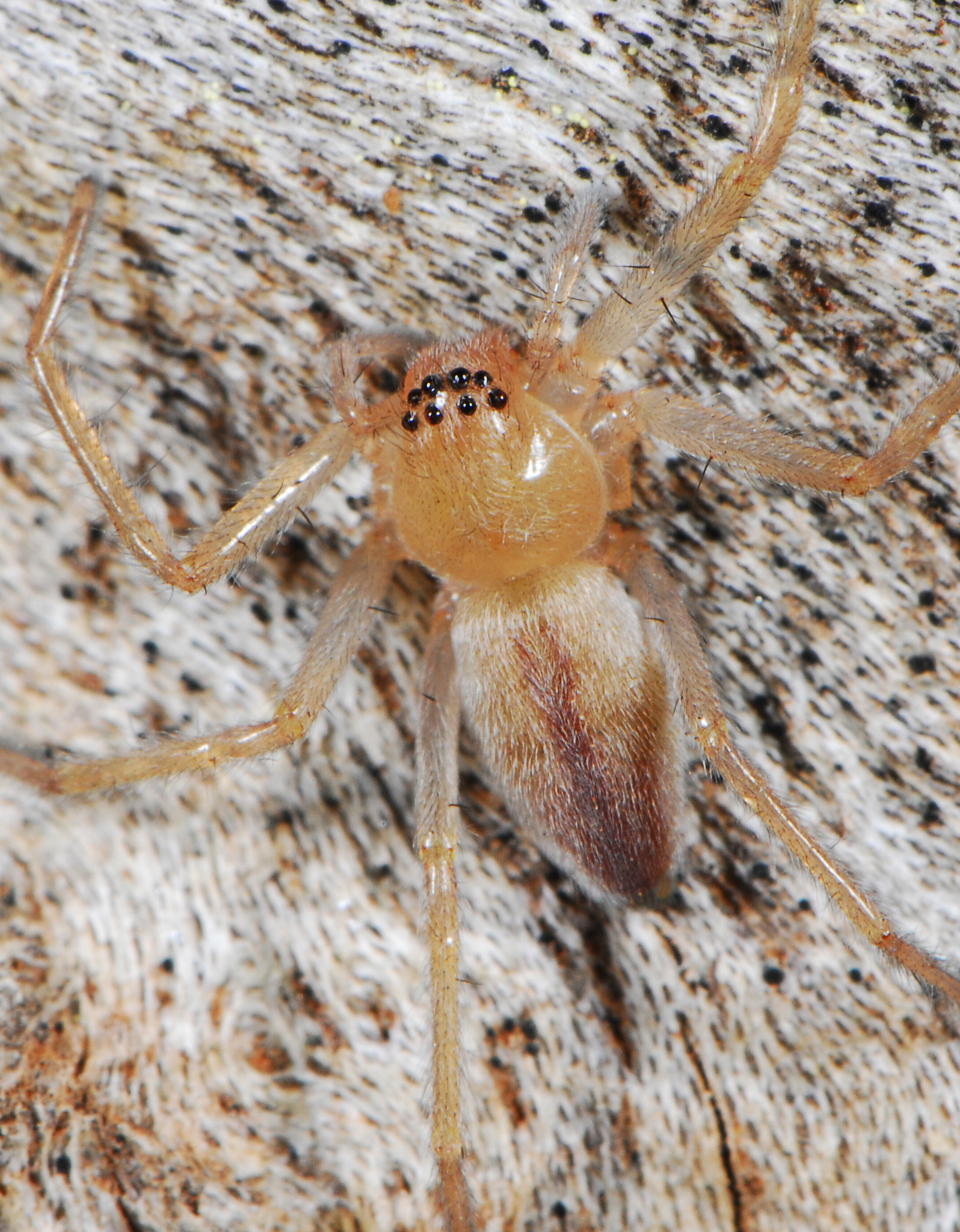
juvenile female

The species belongs to the genus Eusparassus, which are characterised by the presence of two pairs of ventral tibial spines on legs I to IV. The male palp is characterised by the embolus and tegulum nearly of the same length arranged as a U-shaped structure. The female epigyne shows two large lateral lobes typical of the genus.

== Conservation ==
Eusparassus jaegeri is listed as least concern by the South African National Biodiversity Institute due to its wide geographical range. The species is protected in several protected areas including Blouberg Nature Reserve, Kruger National Park, and Ndumo Game Reserve. There are no significant threats to the species.

== Taxonomy ==
The species was described by Moradmand in 2013 and is known from both sexes. The species shows a wide distribution across southern Africa.
