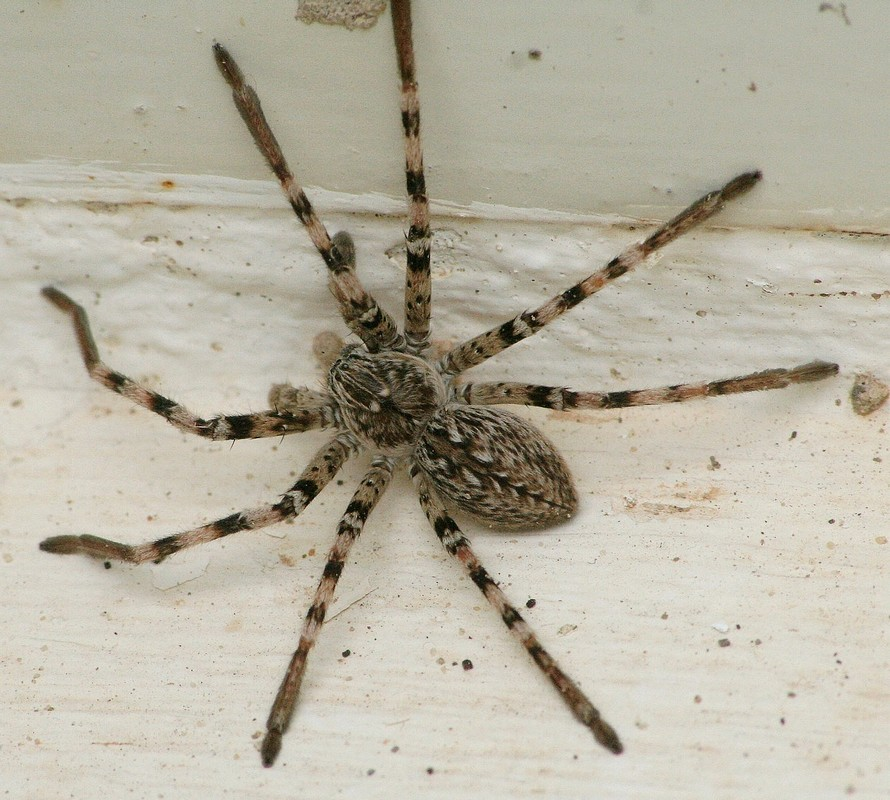
- Eusparassus dufouri
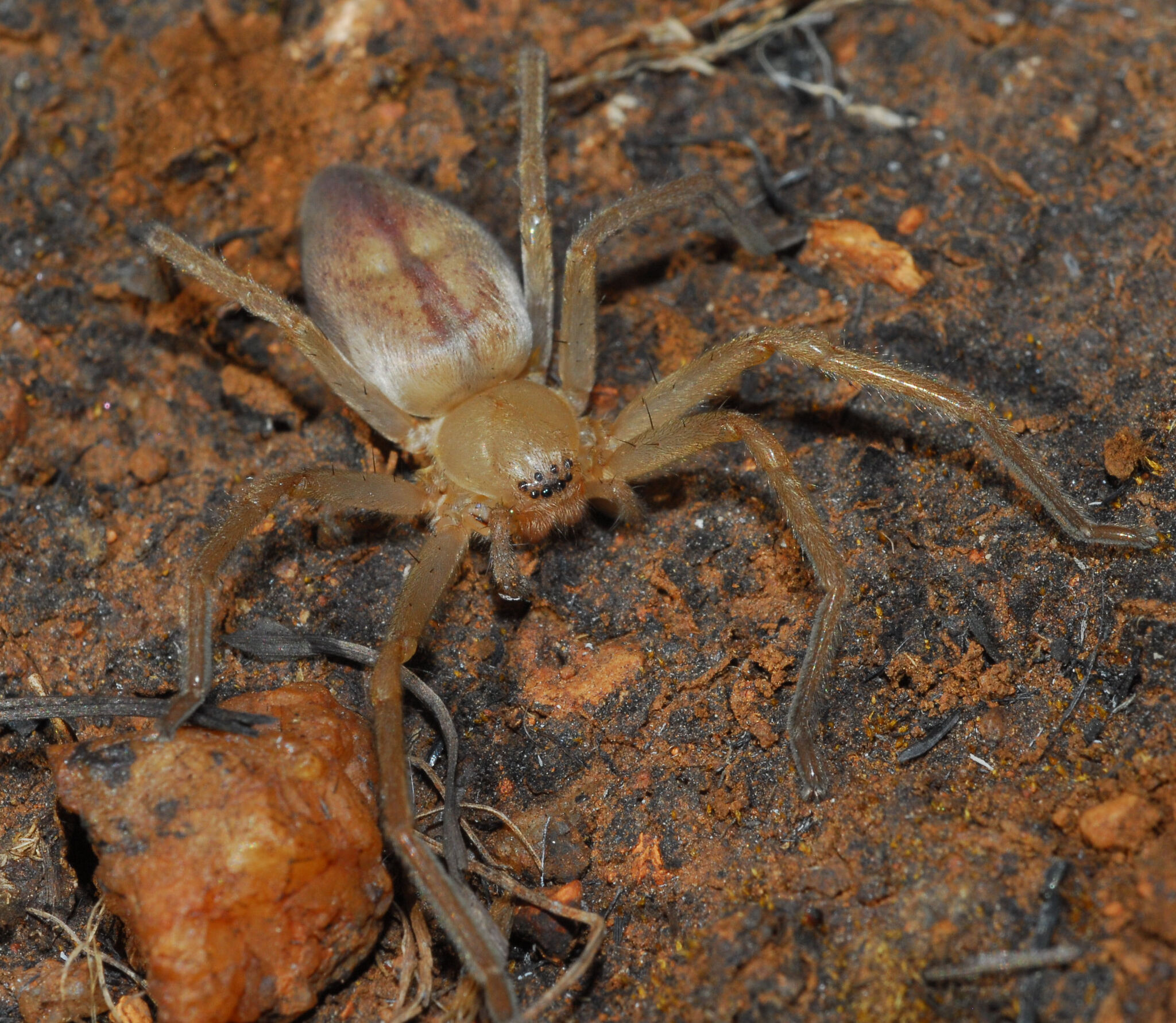
- female E. jaegeri

Scientific classification
- Kingdom: Animalia
- Phylum: Arthropoda
- Subphylum: Chelicerata
- Class: Arachnida
- Order: Araneae
- Infraorder: Araneomorphae
- Family: Sparassidae
- Genus: Eusparassus; Simon, 1903

Type species
- E. dufouri Simon, 1932

Species
- 33, see text

= Eusparassus =

Eusparassus Temporal range: Palaeogene– Present

Genus of spiders

Eusparassus is a genus of huntsman spiders, known as the stone huntsman spiders, it was first described by Eugène Louis Simon in 1903.

== Description ==
They are medium to large huntsman spiders, their bodies measuring from 10mm to 30mm. Their eyes are arranged in two rows, the anterior one being slightly recurved, while the posterior ones are relatively straight. They are pale gray to dark brown spiders, with a uniform coloration in their body. Some may have a clearly patterned body with banded legs.

== Identification ==
They can be identified by the presence of two pairs of tibial spines on the legs and distinguished from the Olios genus by the palpal bulb morphology.

== Habitat ==
They are commonly found in arid and semiarid deserts of Africa and most parts of Eurasia where they inhabit stony habitats and build retreats in crevices. They are one of the most visible arachnid predators in their habitats. They can be found in very high elevations from 3,000 to 4,000m above sea level.

== Webs ==
They make silken papery webs, which are usually found in crevices or the underside of flat stones. This webs are used as protection during molts, or as a retreat during the day. Females of this species lay their egg sacs inside the retreats.

== Species ==
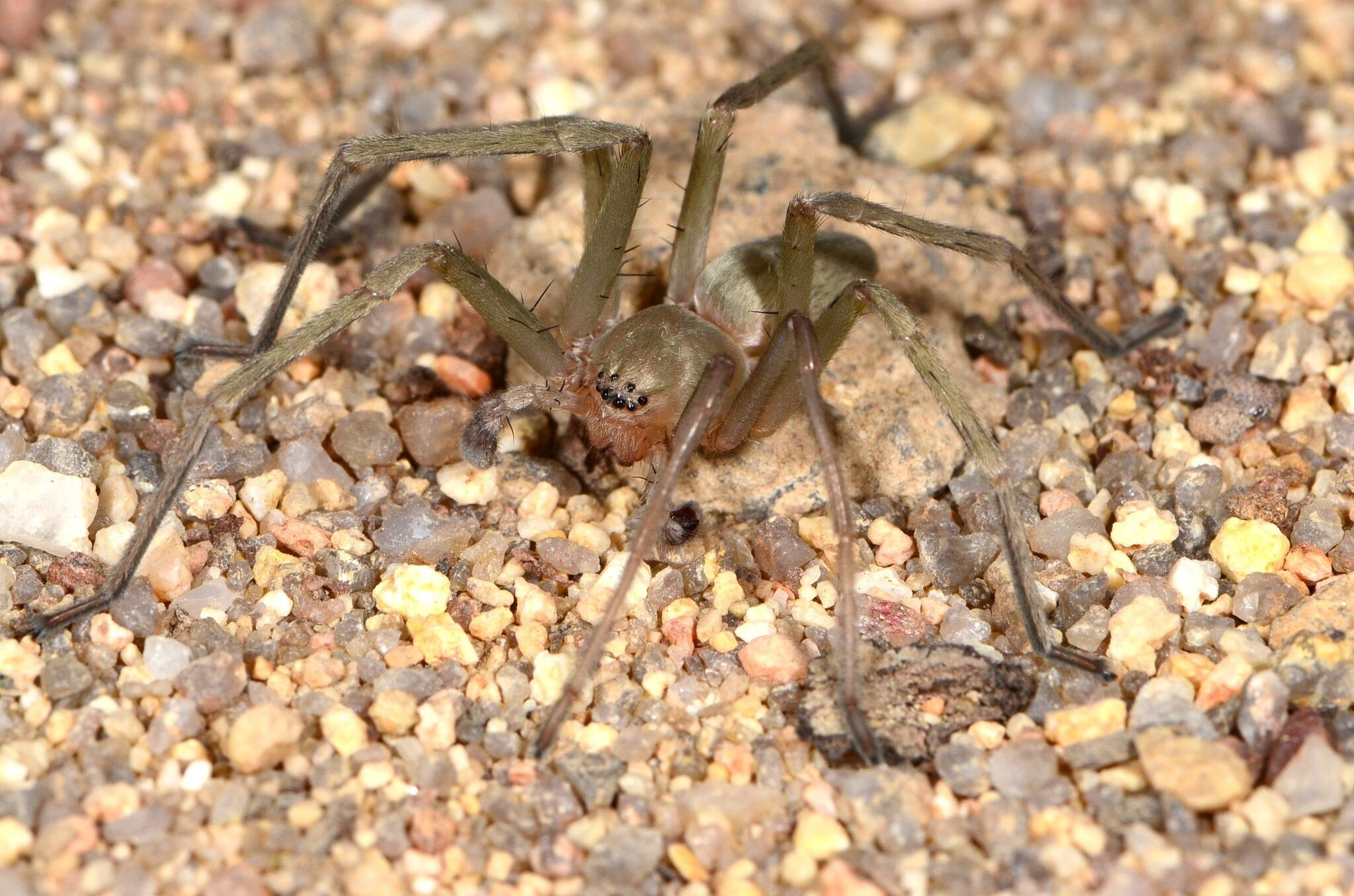
male E. schoemanae

As of September 2025, this genus includes 33 species, found in Africa, Asia, Europe, and Peru:

- Eusparassus arabicus Moradmand, 2013 – Saudi Arabia, United Arab Emirates
- Eusparassus atlanticus Simon, 1909 – Morocco
- Eusparassus barbarus (Lucas, 1846) – Algeria, Tunisia
- Eusparassus bicorniger (Pocock, 1898) – Egypt, Ethiopia, East Africa
- Eusparassus borakalalo Moradmand, 2013 – South Africa
- Eusparassus doriae (Simon, 1874) – Iran
- Eusparassus dufouri Simon, 1932 – Portugal, Spain. Introduced to the Netherlands (type species)
- Eusparassus educatus Moradmand, 2013 – Namibia
- Eusparassus flavidus (O. Pickard-Cambridge, 1885) – China (Yarkand)
- Eusparassus fritschi (C. Koch, 1873) – Morocco
- Eusparassus fuscimanus Denis, 1958 – Afghanistan
- Eusparassus jaegeri Moradmand, 2013 – Botswana, South Africa
- Eusparassus jocquei Moradmand, 2013 – Zimbabwe
- Eusparassus kronebergi Denis, 1958 – Iran, Afghanistan, India
- Eusparassus laevatus (Simon, 1897) – Ethiopia, Djibouti, Somalia, Arabian Peninsula
- Eusparassus letourneuxi (Simon, 1874) – Algeria, Tunisia
- Eusparassus levantinus Urones, 2006 – Spain
- Eusparassus maynardi (Pocock, 1901) – Pakistan
- Eusparassus mesopotamicus Moradmand & Jäger, 2012 – Iraq, Iran, Turkey?
- Eusparassus oculatus (Kroneberg, 1875) – Iran, Central Asia, China
- Eusparassus oraniensis (Lucas, 1846) – North Africa
- Eusparassus pearsoni (Pocock, 1901) – India
- Eusparassus perezi (Simon, 1902) – Somalia, Djibouti, Arabian Peninsula
- Eusparassus pontii Caporiacco, 1935 – India, Pakistan
- Eusparassus potanini (Simon, 1895) – China
- Eusparassus reverentia Moradmand, 2013 – Burkina Faso, Nigeria
- Eusparassus schoemanae Moradmand, 2013 – Namibia, South Africa
- Eusparassus shefteli Chamberlin, 1916 – Peru
- Eusparassus syrticus Simon, 1909 – Tunisia
- Eusparassus tuckeri (Lawrence, 1927) – Angola, Namibia
- Eusparassus vestigator (Simon, 1897) – Ethiopia, Somalia, Kenya, Tanzania
- Eusparassus walckenaeri (Audouin, 1826) – Greece, Turkey, Algeria, Iraq, Sudan
- Eusparassus xerxes (Pocock, 1901) – United Arab Emirates, Iran, Pakistan
