= Eusparassus levantinus =

Scientific classification
- Kingdom: Animalia
- Phylum: Arthropoda
- Subphylum: Chelicerata
- Class: Arachnida
- Order: Araneae
- Infraorder: Araneomorphae
- Family: Sparassidae
- Genus: Eusparassus
- Species: E. levantinus

Binomial name
- Eusparassus levantinus Urones, 2006

Species of spider

Eusparassus levantinus is a spider species found in coastal areas of Spain.
