= Eusparassus borakalalo =

Borakalalo Stone Huntsman Spider

Scientific classification
- Kingdom: Animalia
- Phylum: Arthropoda
- Subphylum: Chelicerata
- Class: Arachnida
- Order: Araneae
- Infraorder: Araneomorphae
- Family: Sparassidae
- Genus: Eusparassus
- Species: E. borakalalo

Binomial name
- Eusparassus borakalalo Moradmand, 2013

Species of spider

Eusparassus borakalalo is a species of spider in the family Sparassidae. It is endemic to South Africa and is commonly known as the Borakalalo stone huntsman spider.

== Distribution ==
Eusparassus borakalalo is found in two South African provinces: Gauteng and Limpopo. Notable locations include Johannesburg, Magaliesburg, Lhuvhondo Nature Reserve, and Rust de Winter.

== Habitat and ecology ==
The species inhabits Grassland and Savanna biomes at elevations ranging from 982 to 1,752 m above sea level. These are free-living nocturnal spiders that during the day hide in silk retreats made on the underside of stones or in crevices of rocks. These retreats are also used when they moult.

== Conservation ==
Eusparassus borakalalo is listed as least concern by the South African National Biodiversity Institute. Much natural habitat remains within its range and it is likely to be under-collected. There are no significant threats to the species.

== Taxonomy ==
The species was described by Moradmand in 2013 and is known only from the female. The holotype was collected from Rust de Winter in Limpopo.
