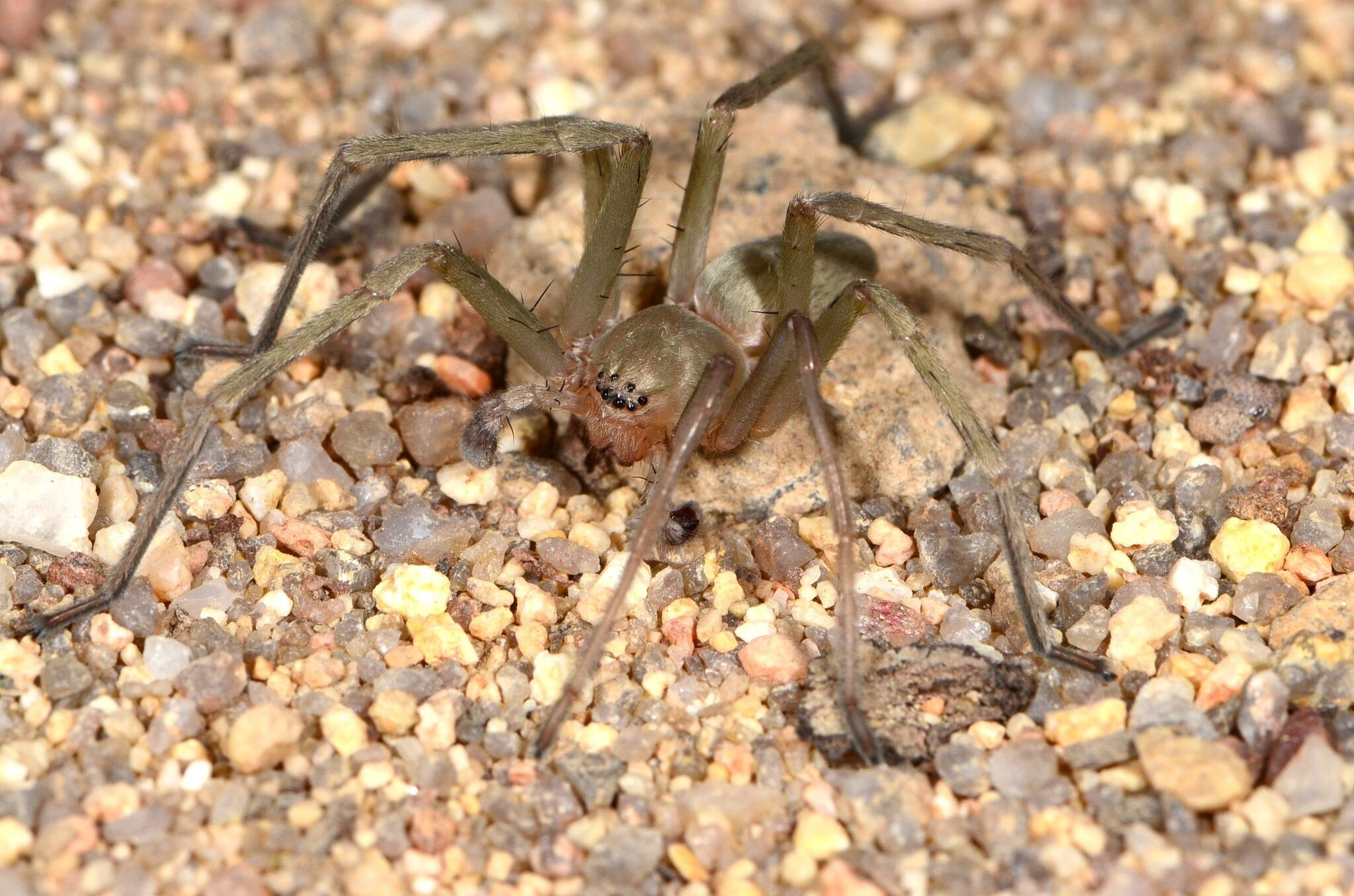
- Male
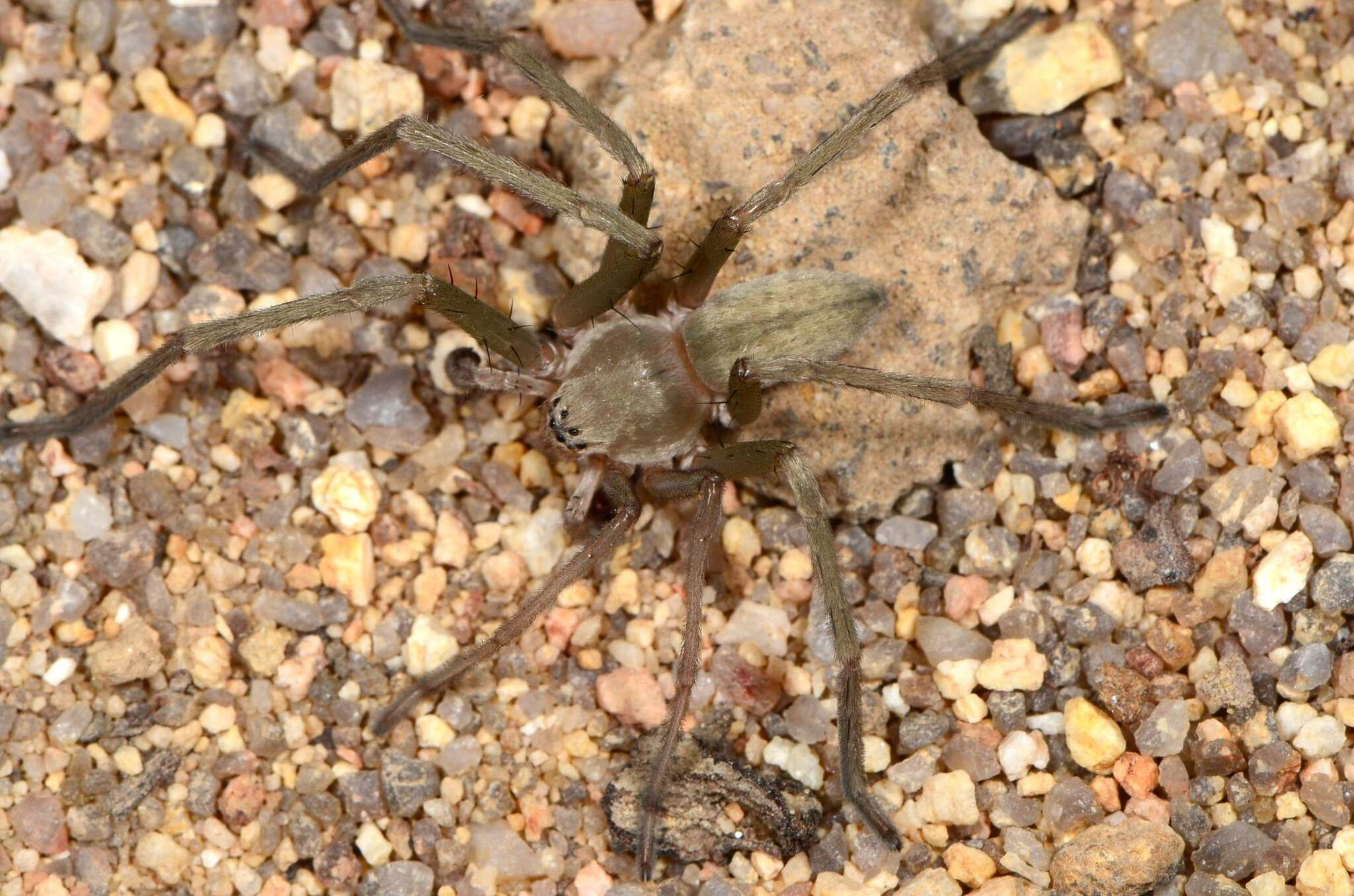
- Male

Scientific classification
- Kingdom: Animalia
- Phylum: Arthropoda
- Subphylum: Chelicerata
- Class: Arachnida
- Order: Araneae
- Infraorder: Araneomorphae
- Family: Sparassidae
- Genus: Eusparassus
- Species: E. schoemanae

Binomial name
- Eusparassus schoemanae Moradmand, 2013

= Eusparassus schoemanae =

Northern Cape Stone Huntsman Spider

Species of spider

Eusparassus schoemanae is a species of spider in the family Sparassidae. It is found in Namibia and South Africa and is commonly known as the Northern Cape stone huntsman spider.

== Distribution ==
Eusparassus schoemanae is found in the Northern Cape and Western Cape provinces of South Africa, and is also known from Namibia. Notable locations include Lieliefontein, Richtersveld Transfrontier National Park, Kgalagadi Transfrontier Park, Tswalu Kalahari Reserve, and various locations around Clanwilliam.

== Habitat and ecology ==
The species inhabits Desert, Succulent Karoo, and Grassland biomes at elevations ranging from 120 to 1,349 m above sea level. These are free-living nocturnal spiders that during the day hide in silk retreats made on the underside of stones or in crevices of rocks.

== Description ==
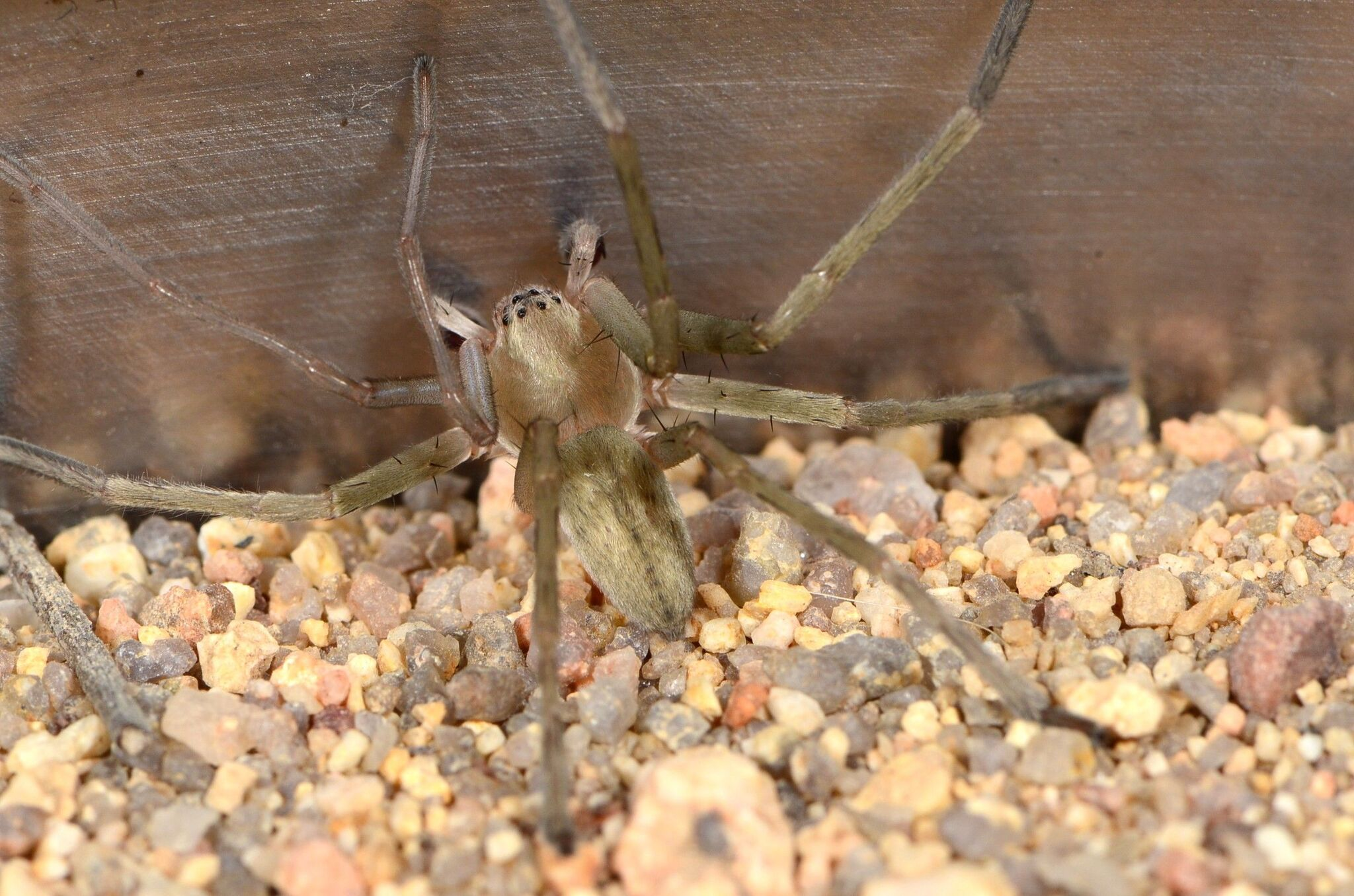
male

The species belongs to the genus Eusparassus, which are characterised by the presence of two pairs of ventral tibial spines on legs I to IV. The male palp is characterised by the embolus and tegulum nearly of the same length arranged as a U-shaped structure. The female epigyne shows two large lateral lobes typical of the genus. The size of this species is largely undocumented but closely related species in the Eusparassus genus generally range from 10-30 mm in body size and a leg span of around 10-15 cm or 4-6 inches.

Like other members of the family Sparassidae, Eusparassus schoemanae is not considered medically significant to humans. While it is capable of biting if handled or threatened, bites are rare and typically result in only mild, localized symptoms such as pain or swelling.

== Conservation ==
Eusparassus schoemanae is listed as least concern by the South African National Biodiversity Institute due to its wide geographical range. The species is protected in the Richtersveld Transfrontier National Park, Kgalagadi Transfrontier Park, Benfontein Nature Reserve, and Tswalu Kalahari Reserve. There are no significant threats to the species.

== Etymology ==
The species is named after South African arachnologist Ansie Dippenaar-Schoeman.

== Taxonomy ==
The species was described by Moradmand in 2013 from Lieliefontein in the Northern Cape and is known from both sexes.
