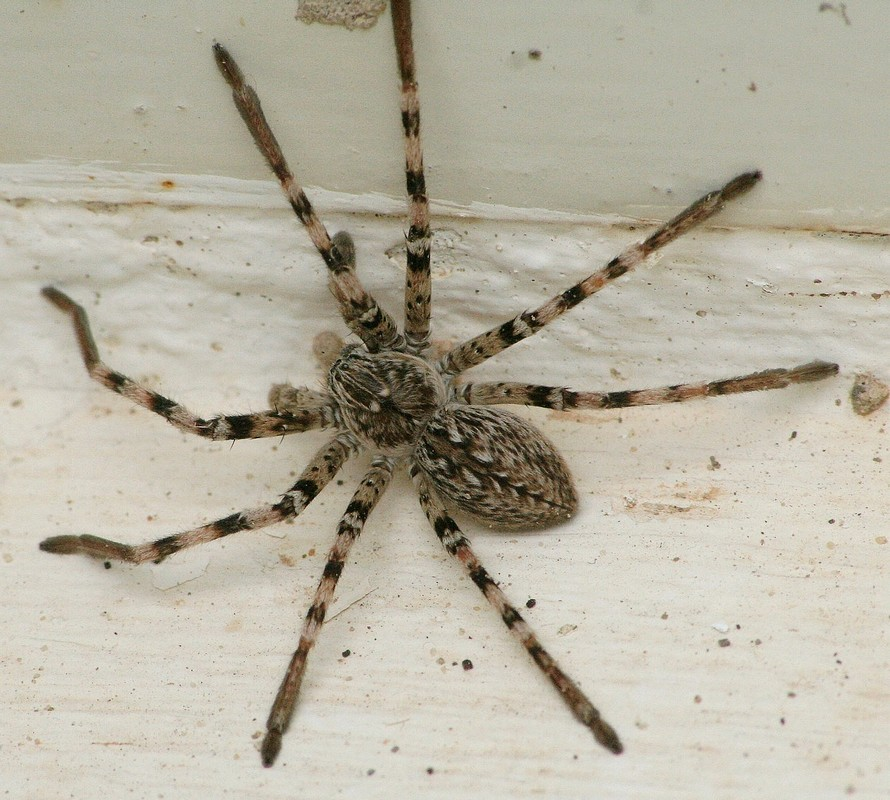

Scientific classification
- Domain: Eukaryota
- Kingdom: Animalia
- Phylum: Arthropoda
- Subphylum: Chelicerata
- Class: Arachnida
- Order: Araneae
- Infraorder: Araneomorphae
- Family: Sparassidae
- Genus: Eusparassus
- Species: E. dufouri

Binomial name
- Eusparassus dufouri Simon, 1932

Synonyms
- Eusparassus argelasius; Micromata argelasia; Sparassus argelasius; Sparassus dufouri

= Eusparassus dufouri =

Species of spider

Eusparassus dufouri is a species of huntsman spider found in Portugal and Spain. It has been introduced to the Netherlands. It is the type species for the genus Eusparassus, and was first described by Eugène Simon in 1932.
