= List of Hersiliidae species =

This page lists all described species of the spider family Hersiliidae accepted by the World Spider Catalog as of January 2021:

== B ==
=== Bastanius ===
Bastanius Mirshamsi, Zamani & Marusik, 2016

- B. foordi (Marusik & Fet, 2009) — Iran
- B. kermanensis Mirshamsi, Zamani & Marusik, 2016 (type) — Iran

=== † Burmesiola ===
† Burmesiola Wunderlich, 2011

- † B. cretacea Wunderlich, 2011
- † B. daviesi Wunderlich, 2015

== D ==
=== Deltshevia ===
Deltshevia Marusik & Fet, 2009

- D. danovi Marusik & Fet, 2009 (type) — Turkmenistan, Kazakhstan
- D. gromovi Marusik & Fet, 2009 — Uzbekistan, Kazakhstan
- D. taftanensis Zamani & Marusik, 2021 — Iran

=== Duninia ===
Duninia Marusik & Fet, 2009

- D. baehrae Marusik & Fet, 2009 (type) — Turkmenistan, Iran
- D. darvishi Mirshamsi & Marusik, 2013 — Iran
- D. grodnitskyi Zamani & Marusik, 2018 — Iran
- D. rheimsae Marusik & Fet, 2009 — Iran

== G ==
=== † Gerdia ===
† Gerdia Menge, 1869

- † G. myura Menge, 1869

=== † Gerdiopsis ===
† Gerdiopsis Wunderlich, 2004

- † G. infringens Wunderlich, 2004

=== † Gerdiorum ===
† Gerdiorum Wunderlich, 2004

- † G. inflexum Wunderlich, 2004

== H ==
=== Hersilia ===
Hersilia

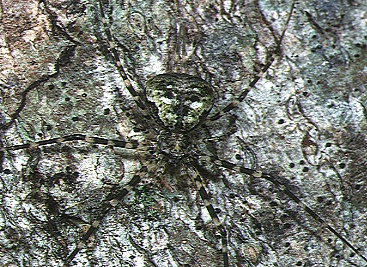
Hersilia okinawaensis, female

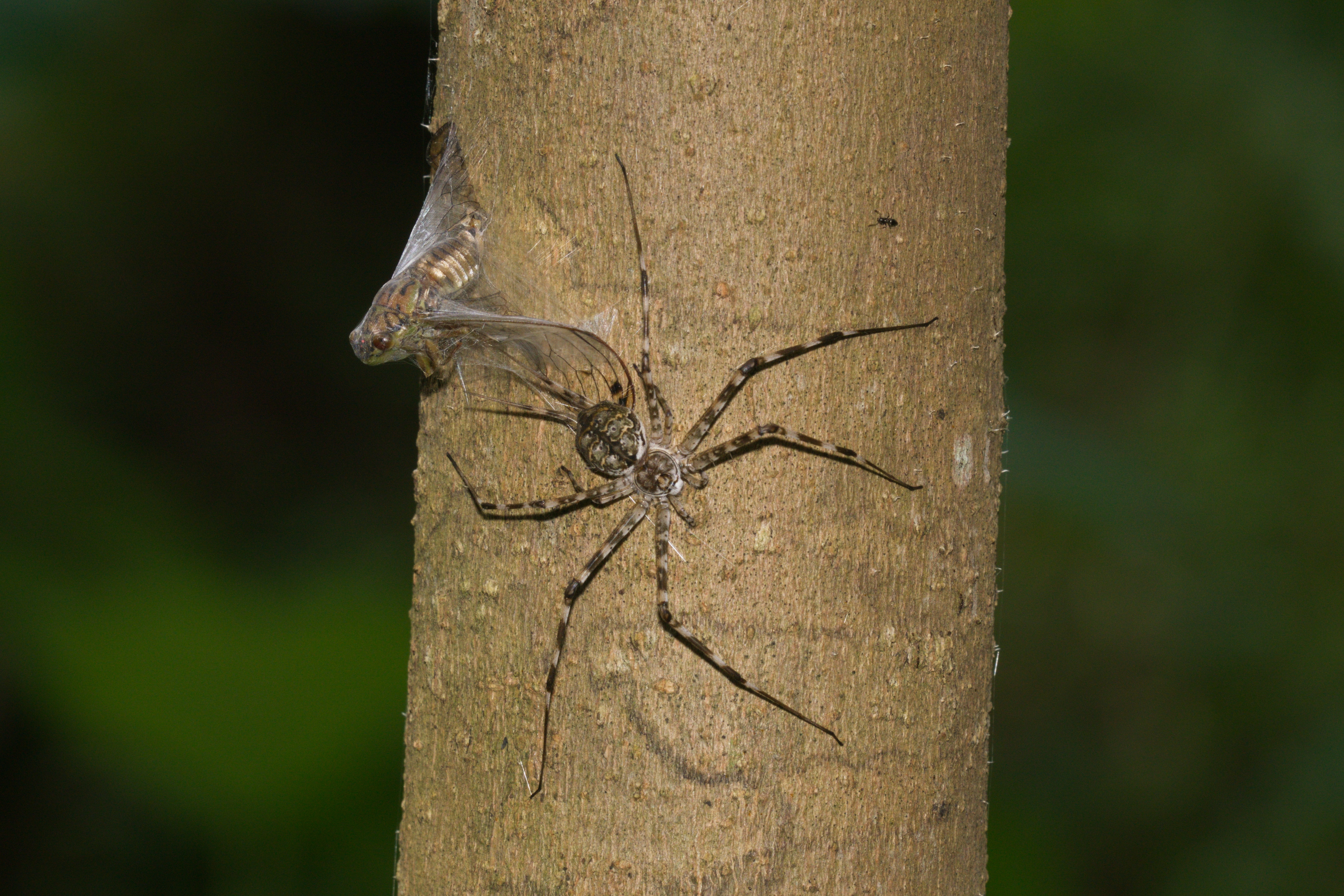
Hersilia savignyi

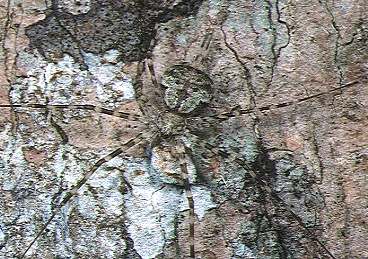
Hersilia yaeyamaensis, female

Hersilia Audouin, 1826

- H. albicomis Simon, 1887 — Ghana, Ivory Coast, Equatorial Guinea, Nigeria
- H. albinota Baehr & Baehr, 1993 — China
- H. albomaculata Wang & Yin, 1985 — China
- H. aldabrensis Foord & Dippenaar-Schoeman, 2006 — Seychelles (Aldabra), Comoros
- H. alluaudi Berland, 1920 — Congo, Tanzania
- H. arborea Lawrence, 1928 — Namibia, Zimbabwe, South Africa
- H. asiatica Song & Zheng, 1982 — China, Taiwan, Thailand, Laos
- H. australiensis Baehr & Baehr, 1987 — Australia (Northern Territory)
- H. baforti Benoit, 1967 — Congo, Uganda
- H. baliensis Baehr & Baehr, 1993 — Laos, Bali
- H. bifurcata Baehr & Baehr, 1998 — Australia (Northern Territory)
- H. bubi Foord & Dippenaar-Schoeman, 2006 — Equatorial Guinea, Uganda
- H. carobi Foord & Dippenaar-Schoeman, 2006 — Ivory Coast
- H. caudata Audouin, 1826 (type) — Cape Verde Is., West Africa to China
- H. clarki Benoit, 1967 — Zimbabwe
- H. clypealis Baehr & Baehr, 1993 — Thailand
- H. deelemanae Baehr & Baehr, 1993 — Indonesia (Sumatra)
- H. eloetsensis Foord & Dippenaar-Schoeman, 2006 — Madagascar
- H. facialis Baehr & Baehr, 1993 — Indonesia (Sumatra)
- H. feai Baehr & Baehr, 1993 — Myanmar
- H. flagellifera Baehr & Baehr, 1993 — Laos, Indonesia (Sumatra)
- H. furcata Foord & Dippenaar-Schoeman, 2006 — Congo
- H. hildebrandti Karsch, 1878 — Tanzania
- H. igiti Foord & Dippenaar-Schoeman, 2006 — Rwanda
- H. impressifrons Baehr & Baehr, 1993 — Borneo
- H. incompta Benoit, 1971 — Ivory Coast
- H. insulana Strand, 1907 — Madagascar
- H. jajat Rheims & Brescovit, 2004 — Borneo
- H. kerekot Rheims & Brescovit, 2004 — Borneo
- H. kinabaluensis Baehr & Baehr, 1993 — Borneo
- H. lelabah Rheims & Brescovit, 2004 — Borneo
- H. longbottomi Baehr & Baehr, 1998 — Australia (Western Australia)
- H. longivulva Sen, Saha & Raychaudhuri, 2010 — India
- H. madagascariensis (Wunderlich, 2004) — Madagascar, Comoros
- H. madang Baehr & Baehr, 1993 — New Guinea
- H. mainae Baehr & Baehr, 1995 — Australia (Western Australia)
- H. martensi Baehr & Baehr, 1993 — Nepal, Thailand
- H. mboszi Foord & Dippenaar-Schoeman, 2006 — Cameroon, Ivory Coast
- H. mimbi Baehr & Baehr, 1993 — Australia (Western Australia)
- H. mjoebergi Baehr & Baehr, 1993 — Indonesia (Sumatra)
- H. moheliensis Foord & Dippenaar-Schoeman, 2006 — Comoros
- H. montana Chen, 2007 — Taiwan
- H. mowomogbe Foord & Dippenaar-Schoeman, 2006 — Cameroon, Congo
- H. nentwigi Baehr & Baehr, 1993 — Indonesia (Java, Sumatra, Krakatau)
- H. nepalensis Baehr & Baehr, 1993 — Nepal
- H. novaeguineae Baehr & Baehr, 1993 — New Guinea
- H. occidentalis Simon, 1907 — West, Central, East Africa
- H. okinawaensis Tanikawa, 1999 — Japan
- H. orvakalensis Javed, Foord & Tampal, 2010 — India
- H. pectinata Thorell, 1895 — Myanmar, Indonesia (Borneo), Philippines
- H. pungwensis Tucker, 1920 — Zimbabwe
- H. sagitta Foord & Dippenaar-Schoeman, 2006 — Kenya, Tanzania, Malawi, South Africa
- H. savignyi Lucas, 1836 — Sri Lanka, India to Philippines
- H. scrupulosa Foord & Dippenaar-Schoeman, 2006 — Kenya, India
- H. selempoi Foord & Dippenaar-Schoeman, 2006 — Kenya
- H. sericea Pocock, 1898 — Kenya, Tanzania, Botswana, Zimbabwe, Mozambique, South Africa, Eswatini
- H. serrata Dankittipakul & Singtripop, 2011 — Thailand
- H. setifrons Lawrence, 1928 — Angola, Namibia, Zimbabwe, South Africa
- H. sigillata Benoit, 1967 — Gabon, Ivory Coast, Congo, Uganda
- H. simplicipalpis Baehr & Baehr, 1993 — Thailand
- H. striata Wang & Yin, 1985 — India, China, Myanmar, Thailand, Taiwan, Indonesia (Java, Sumatra)
- H. sumatrana (Thorell, 1890) — India, Malaysia, Indonesia (Sumatra, Borneo)
- H. sundaica Baehr & Baehr, 1993 — Thailand, Indonesia (Lombok, Sumbawa)
- H. taita Foord & Dippenaar-Schoeman, 2006 — Kenya
- H. taiwanensis Chen, 2007 — Taiwan
- H. talebii Mirshamsi, Zamani & Marusik, 2016 — Iran
- H. tamatavensis Foord & Dippenaar-Schoeman, 2006 — Madagascar
- H. tenuifurcata Baehr & Baehr, 1998 — Australia (Western Australia)
- H. thailandica Dankittipakul & Singtripop, 2011 — Thailand
- H. tibialis Baehr & Baehr, 1993 — India, Sri Lanka
- H. vanmoli Benoit, 1971 — Ivory Coast, Togo
- H. vicina Baehr & Baehr, 1993 — Thailand
- H. vinsoni Lucas, 1869 — Madagascar
- H. wellswebberae Baehr & Baehr, 1998 — Australia (Northern Territory)
- H. wraniki Rheims, Brescovit & van Harten, 2004 — Yemen (mainland, Socotra)
- H. xieae Yin, 2012 — China
- H. yaeyamaensis Tanikawa, 1999 — Japan
- H. yunnanensis Wang, Song & Qiu, 1993 — China
- † H. aquisextana Gourret, 1887
- † H. longipes Giebel, 1856
- † H. miranda Koch and Berendt, 1854

=== † Hersiliana ===
† Hersiliana Wunderlich, 2004

- † H. brevipes Wunderlich, 2004

=== Hersiliola ===
Hersiliola

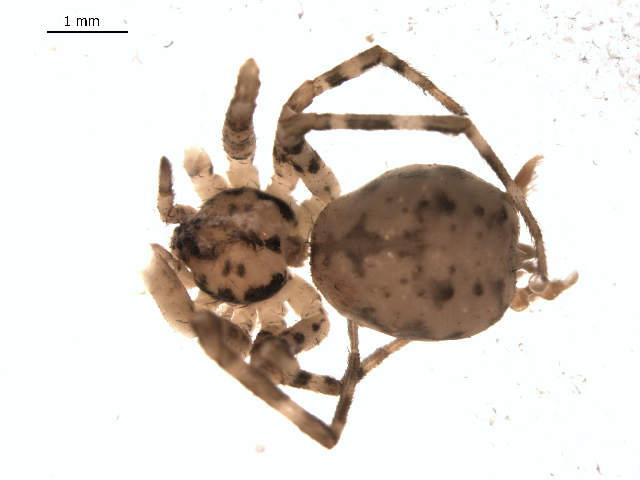
Hersiliola turcica

Hersiliola Thorell, 1870

- H. afghanica Roewer, 1960 — Afghanistan
- H. artemisiae Zamani, Mirshamsi & Marusik, 2017 — Iran
- H. bayrami Danişman, Sancak, Erdek & Coşar, 2012 — Turkey
- H. eltigani El-Hennawy, 2010 — Sudan
- H. esyunini Marusik & Fet, 2009 — Uzbekistan
- H. lindbergi Marusik & Fet, 2009 — Afghanistan
- H. macullulata (Dufour, 1831) (type) — Spain, Algeria, Mali, Israel, Yemen, Iran
- H. simoni (O. Pickard-Cambridge, 1872) — Spain, Northern Africa, Middle East, Iran
- H. sternbergsi Marusik & Fet, 2009 — Turkmenistan, Uzbekistan, Iran
- H. turcica Marusik, Kunt & Yağmur, 2010 — Turkey, Iran
- H. versicolor (Blackwall, 1865) — Cape Verde Is., Canary Is.?
- H. xinjiangensis (Liang & Wang, 1989) — China

== I ==
=== Iviraiva ===
Iviraiva Rheims & Brescovit, 2004

- I. argentina (Mello-Leitão, 1942) — Brazil, Bolivia, Paraguay, Argentina
- I. pachyura (Mello-Leitão, 1935) (type) — Brazil, Paraguay, Argentina, Uruguay

== M ==
=== Murricia ===
Murricia Simon, 1882

- M. cornuta Baehr & Baehr, 1993 — Singapore
- M. crinifera Baehr & Baehr, 1993 — Sri Lanka
- M. hyderabadensis Javed & Tampal, 2010 — India
- M. trapezodica Sen, Saha & Raychaudhuri, 2010 — India
- M. triangularis Baehr & Baehr, 1993 — India
- M. uva Foord, 2008 — Cameroon to Uganda

== N ==
=== Neotama ===
Neotama Baehr & Baehr, 1993

- N. corticola (Lawrence, 1937) — South Africa
- N. cunhabebe Rheims & Brescovit, 2004 — Peru, Brazil
- N. forcipata (F. O. Pickard-Cambridge, 1902) — Mexico to El Salvador
- N. longimana Baehr & Baehr, 1993 — Indonesia (Java, Sumatra)
- N. mexicana (O. Pickard-Cambridge, 1893) — USA to Peru, Guyana
- N. obatala Rheims & Brescovit, 2004 — Peru, Brazil, Guyana
- N. punctigera Baehr & Baehr, 1993 — India
- N. rothorum Baehr & Baehr, 1993 — India
- N. variata (Pocock, 1899) (type) — Sri Lanka

== O ==
=== Ovtsharenkoia ===
Ovtsharenkoia

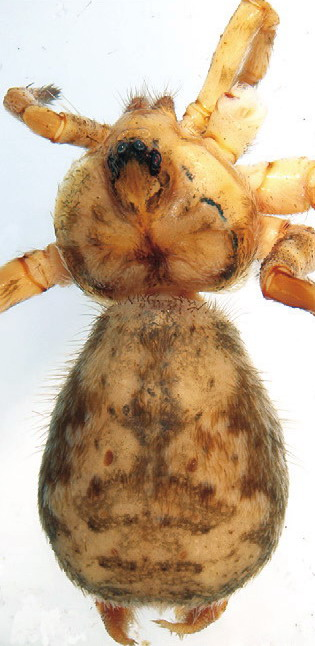
Ovtsharenkoia pallida, female

Ovtsharenkoia Marusik & Fet, 2009

- O. pallida (Kroneberg, 1875) (type) — Central Asia

== P ==
=== Prima ===
Prima Foord, 2008

- P. ansieae Foord, 2008 (type) — Madagascar

=== Promurricia ===
Promurricia Baehr & Baehr, 1993

- P. depressa Baehr & Baehr, 1993 (type) — Sri Lanka

=== † Prototama ===
† Prototama Petrunkevitch, 1971

- † P. antiqua Petrunkevitch, 1971
- † P. maior Wunderlich, 1988
- † P. media Wunderlich, 1988
- † P. minor Wunderlich, 1987
- † P. succinea Petrunkevitch, 1971

== S ==
=== † Spinasilia ===
† Spinasilia Wunderlich, 2015

- † S. dissoluta Wunderlich, 2015

== T ==
=== Tama ===
Tama Simon, 1882

- T. edwardsi (Lucas, 1846) (type) — Spain, Portugal, Algeria

=== Tamopsis ===
Tamopsis

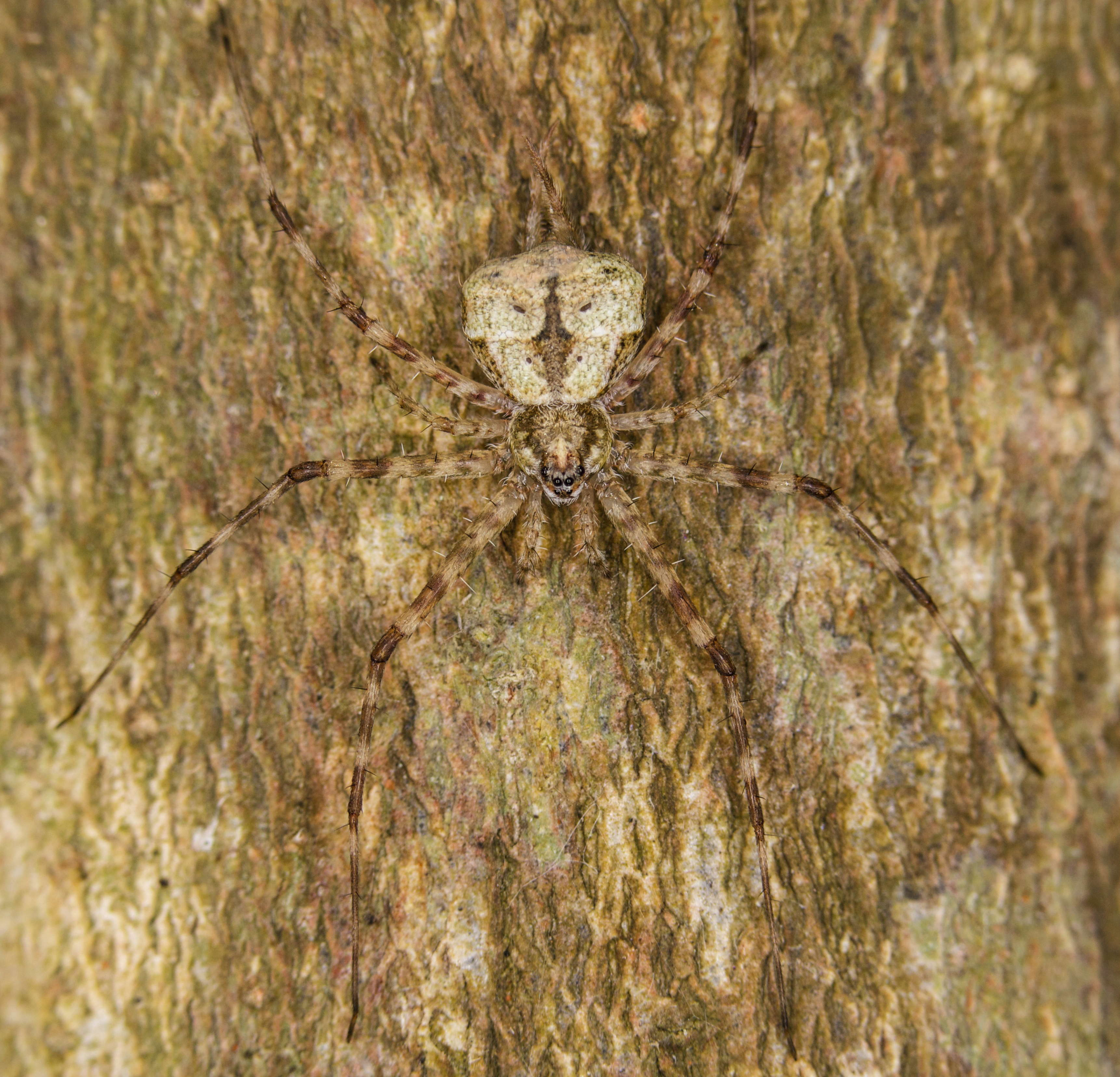
Brisbane two-tailed spider
(Tamopsis brisbanensis)

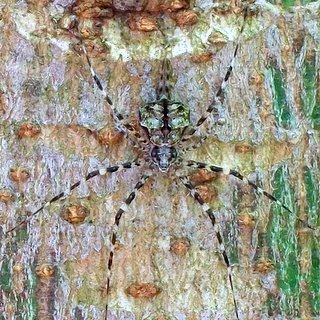
Tamopsis novaehollandiae

Tamopsis Baehr & Baehr, 1987

- T. amplithorax Baehr & Baehr, 1987 — Australia (Western Australia)
- T. arnhemensis Baehr & Baehr, 1987 — Australia (Northern Territory, Queensland)
- T. brachycauda Baehr & Baehr, 1987 — Australia (Queensland, New South Wales)
- T. brevipes Baehr & Baehr, 1987 — Australia (New South Wales)
- T. brisbanensis Baehr & Baehr, 1987 — Australia (Queensland, New South Wales)
- T. centralis Baehr & Baehr, 1987 — Australia (Queensland)
- T. circumvidens Baehr & Baehr, 1987 — Australia (Western Australia, Victoria)
- T. cooloolensis Baehr & Baehr, 1987 — Australia (Queensland)
- T. darlingtoniana Baehr & Baehr, 1987 — Australia (Western Australia)
- T. daviesae Baehr & Baehr, 1987 — Australia (Queensland)
- T. depressa Baehr & Baehr, 1992 — Australia (Western Australia, Northern Territory)
- T. ediacarae Baehr & Baehr, 1988 — Australia (South Australia)
- T. eucalypti (Rainbow, 1900) (type) — Australia (Queensland to South Australia)
- T. facialis Baehr & Baehr, 1993 — Australia (Western Australia, South Australia, New South Wales)
- T. fickerti (L. Koch, 1876) — Australia (Queensland, New South Wales, Victoria)
- T. fitzroyensis Baehr & Baehr, 1987 — Australia (Western Australia, Queensland)
- T. floreni Rheims & Brescovit, 2004 — Borneo
- T. forrestae Baehr & Baehr, 1988 — Australia (Queensland)
- T. gibbosa Baehr & Baehr, 1993 — Australia (Western Australia, South Australia)
- T. gracilis Baehr & Baehr, 1993 — Australia (Western Australia)
- T. grayi Baehr & Baehr, 1987 — Australia (New South Wales)
- T. harveyi Baehr & Baehr, 1993 — Australia (Northern Territory)
- T. hirsti Baehr & Baehr, 1998 — Australia (South Australia)
- T. jongi Baehr & Baehr, 1995 — Australia (Western Australia)
- T. kimberleyana Baehr & Baehr, 1998 — Australia (Western Australia)
- T. kochi Baehr & Baehr, 1987 — Australia (Western Australia, New South Wales)
- T. leichhardtiana Baehr & Baehr, 1987 — Australia (Western Australia, Northern Territory, Queensland)
- T. longbottomi Baehr & Baehr, 1993 — Australia (Northern Territory)
- T. mainae Baehr & Baehr, 1993 — Australia (Western Australia)
- T. mallee Baehr & Baehr, 1989 — Australia (Western, South Australia, New South Wales)
- T. minor Baehr & Baehr, 1998 — Australia (Western Australia)
- T. nanutarrae Baehr & Baehr, 1989 — Australia (Western Australia)
- T. occidentalis Baehr & Baehr, 1987 — Australia (Western Australia)
- T. perthensis Baehr & Baehr, 1987 — Australia (Western Australia)
- T. petricola Baehr & Baehr, 1995 — Australia (Queensland)
- T. piankai Baehr & Baehr, 1993 — Australia (Western Australia)
- T. platycephala Baehr & Baehr, 1987 — Australia (Queensland)
- T. pseudocircumvidens Baehr & Baehr, 1987 — Australia (Western Australia, South Australia, Northern Territory)
- T. queenslandica Baehr & Baehr, 1987 — Australia (Queensland, New South Wales)
- T. raveni Baehr & Baehr, 1987 — Australia (Queensland, South Australia)
- T. reevesbyana Baehr & Baehr, 1987 — Australia (Western Australia, South Australia)
- T. riverinae Baehr & Baehr, 1993 — Australia (New South Wales)
- T. rossi Baehr & Baehr, 1987 — Australia (Western Australia)
- T. transiens Baehr & Baehr, 1992 — Australia (Western Australia, Northern Territory, Victoria)
- T. trionix Baehr & Baehr, 1987 — Australia (Queensland)
- T. tropica Baehr & Baehr, 1987 — Australia (Northern Territory, Queensland)
- T. tweedensis Baehr & Baehr, 1987 — Australia (Queensland, New South Wales)
- T. warialdae Baehr & Baehr, 1998 — Australia (New South Wales)
- T. wau Baehr & Baehr, 1993 — New Guinea
- T. weiri Baehr & Baehr, 1995 — Australia (Western Australia)

=== Tyrotama ===
Tyrotama Foord & Dippenaar-Schoeman, 2005

- T. abyssus Foord & Dippenaar-Schoeman, 2005 — South Africa, Lesotho
- T. arida (Smithers, 1945) (type) — South Africa
- T. australis (Simon, 1893) — Botswana, South Africa, Lesotho
- T. bicava (Smithers, 1945) — Angola, Namibia, South Africa
- T. fragilis (Lawrence, 1928) — Angola, Namibia
- T. incerta (Tucker, 1920) — Namibia, South Africa
- T. soutpansbergensis Foord & Dippenaar-Schoeman, 2005 — South Africa
- T. taris Foord & Dippenaar-Schoeman, 2005 — South Africa

== Y ==
=== Yabisi ===
Yabisi Rheims & Brescovit, 2004

- Y. guaba Rheims & Brescovit, 2004 — Dominican Rep.
- Y. habanensis (Franganillo, 1936) (type) — USA, Cuba

=== Ypypuera ===
Ypypuera Rheims & Brescovit, 2004

- Y. crucifera (Vellard, 1924) (type) — Venezuela to Argentina
- Y. esquisita Rheims & Brescovit, 2004 — Ecuador
- Y. vittata (Simon, 1887) — Venezuela, Peru, Brazil, Suriname
