= Tama novaehollandiae =

Tama novaehollandiae or Tamopsis novaehollandiae are names used for an Australian spider species. However, the original type specimen has been lost, and it is not clear which, if any, of the many species of Tamopsis now recognized the name refers to, so it is treated as a nomen dubium (doubtful name). Tamopsis is placed in the family Hersiliidae.

== Taxonomy ==
The species was first described in 1876 by German entomologist Ludwig Carl Christian Koch, who had studied and described many Australian spiders in the 19th century. Koch placed the species in the genus Chalinura. Its specific name novaehollandiae is a Latin form of "New Holland", an archaic name for Australia. Simon transferred the species to the genus Rhadine in 1882 and then to Tama in 1892.

In 1987, Barbara Baehr and Martin Baehr reviewed the Australian members of the family Hersiliidae and transferred all Australian species of Tama to their new genus Tamopsis. The type specimen of Koch's Chalinura novaehollandiae appears to have been lost in Hamburg during World War II. Baehr and Baehr discovered that many specimens that had been identified as Tama novaehollandiae were actually different species. They concluded that it was a nomen dubium (dubious name), and that the species will "probably remain doubtful for ever".

Species that have been misidentified as T. novaehollandiae include:

- Tamopsis brachycauda
- Tamopsis brevipes
- Tamopsis brisbanensis
- Tamopsis centralis
- Tamopsis daviesi
