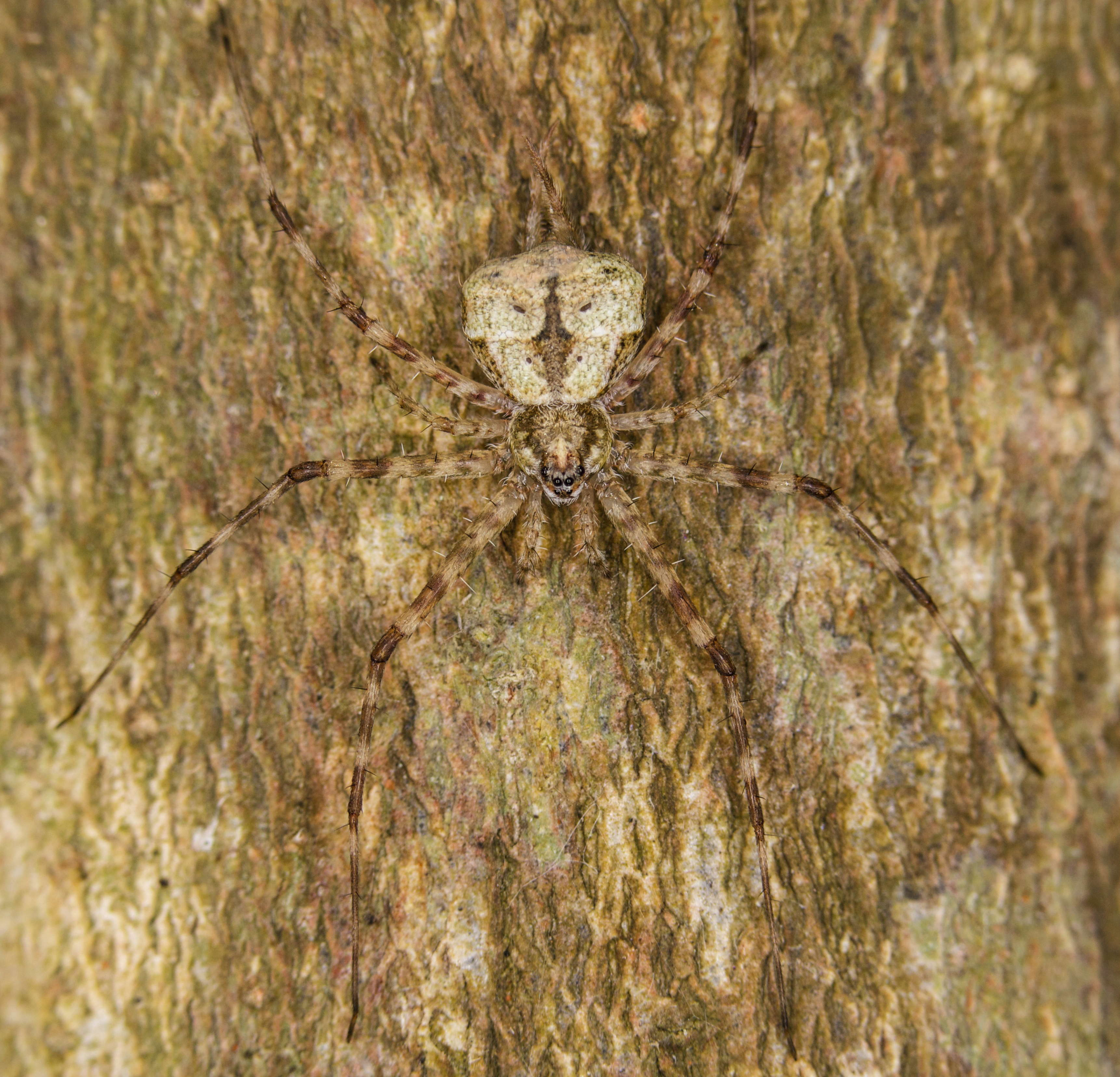
- Tamopsis brisbanensis

Scientific classification
- Kingdom: Animalia
- Phylum: Arthropoda
- Subphylum: Chelicerata
- Class: Arachnida
- Order: Araneae
- Infraorder: Araneomorphae
- Family: Hersiliidae
- Genus: Tamopsis; Baehr & Baehr, 1987

Type species
- T. eucalypti (Rainbow, 1900)

Species
- 50, see text

= Tamopsis =

Genus of spiders

Tamopsis is a genus of tree trunk spiders that was first described by B. Baehr & M. Baehr in 1987. Like other members of the family, they may be called two-tailed spiders, referring to two elongated spinnerets. The name is derived from the genus Tama and the Ancient Greek ὄψις (-opsis), meaning "resembling".

These spiders differ from Tama edwardsi in the more complex palpal bulb and the median apophysis that may either be coiled or have a hook- or spoon-shaped structure at its tip. These species are generally arboreal, where the spiders originally included in Tama in 1987 are mainly terrestrial.

== Distribution ==
Spiders in this genus are mostly endemic to Australia, with one species endemic to New Guinea.

== Description ==
Tamopsis species are small to medium-sized spiders. Females of the type species Tamopsis eucalypti have a body length of about 7 millimetres (0.28 in), and males have a body length of about 5 millimetres (0.20 in). They resemble other members of the family Hersiliidae in having unusually long posterior lateral spinnerets (the outside rear pair), which in some species can be longer than the abdomen. They live in trees rather than on the ground and do not make complex webs. Their legs are relatively long, with an undivided metatarsus. The chelicerae have three teeth at the front edge. The male palpal bulb has a complex median apophysis (projection), sometimes coiled and usually with a hook-shaped structure at the end. The embolus of the palpal bulb can slide out of a lateral apophysis, which otherwise partly or completely hides it. The female has one to three seminal receptacles on each side.

== Species ==
In 1987, Barbara Baehr and Martin Baehr reviewed the Australian members of the family Hersiliidae. They erected a new genus Tamopsis, and described 25 new species within the genus. Two species formerly placed in the genus Tama were transferred to Tamopsis. They described even more species in a series of papers from 1988 to 1998.

Two Australian species, T. novaehollandiae and T. brachyura, are regarded as doubtful because their described types are either juveniles or have been lost and are not identifiable from their descriptions.

As of October 2025, this genus includes fifty species:

- Tamopsis amplithorax B. Baehr & M. Baehr, 1987 – Australia (Western Australia)
- Tamopsis arnhemensis B. Baehr & M. Baehr, 1987 – Australia (Northern Territory, Queensland)
- Tamopsis brachycauda B. Baehr & M. Baehr, 1987 – Australia (Queensland, New South Wales)
- Tamopsis brevipes B. Baehr & M. Baehr, 1987 – Australia (New South Wales)
- Tamopsis brisbanensis B. Baehr & M. Baehr, 1987 – Australia (Queensland, New South Wales)
- Tamopsis centralis B. Baehr & M. Baehr, 1987 – Australia (Queensland)
- Tamopsis circumvidens B. Baehr & M. Baehr, 1987 – Australia (Western Australia, Victoria)
- Tamopsis cooloolensis B. Baehr & M. Baehr, 1987 – Australia (Queensland)
- Tamopsis darlingtoniana B. Baehr & M. Baehr, 1987 – Australia (Western Australia)
- Tamopsis daviesae B. Baehr & M. Baehr, 1987 – Australia (Queensland)
- Tamopsis depressa B. Baehr & M. Baehr, 1992 – Australia (Western Australia, Northern Territory)
- Tamopsis ediacarae B. Baehr & M. Baehr, 1988 – Australia (South Australia)
- Tamopsis eucalypti (Rainbow, 1900) – Australia (Queensland to South Australia) (type species)
- Tamopsis facialis B. Baehr & M. Baehr, 1993 – Australia (Western Australia, South Australia, New South Wales)
- Tamopsis fickerti (L. Koch, 1876) – Australia (Queensland, New South Wales, Victoria)
- Tamopsis fitzroyensis B. Baehr & M. Baehr, 1987 – Australia (Western Australia, Queensland)
- Tamopsis floreni Rheims & Brescovit, 2004 – Borneo
- Tamopsis forrestae B. Baehr & M. Baehr, 1988 – Australia (Queensland)
- Tamopsis gibbosa B. Baehr & M. Baehr, 1993 – Australia (Western Australia, South Australia)
- Tamopsis gracilis B. Baehr & M. Baehr, 1993 – Australia (Western Australia)
- Tamopsis grayi B. Baehr & M. Baehr, 1987 – Australia (New South Wales)
- Tamopsis harveyi B. Baehr & M. Baehr, 1993 – Australia (Northern Territory)
- Tamopsis hirsti B. Baehr & M. Baehr, 1998 – Australia (South Australia)
- Tamopsis jongi B. Baehr & M. Baehr, 1995 – Australia (Western Australia)
- Tamopsis kimberleyana B. Baehr & M. Baehr, 1998 – Australia (Western Australia)
- Tamopsis kochi B. Baehr & M. Baehr, 1987 – Australia (Western Australia, New South Wales)
- Tamopsis leichhardtiana B. Baehr & M. Baehr, 1987 – Australia (Western Australia, Northern Territory, Queensland)
- Tamopsis longbottomi B. Baehr & M. Baehr, 1993 – Australia (Northern Territory)
- Tamopsis mainae B. Baehr & M. Baehr, 1993 – Australia (Western Australia)
- Tamopsis mallee B. Baehr & M. Baehr, 1989 – Australia (Western, South Australia, New South Wales)
- Tamopsis minor B. Baehr & M. Baehr, 1998 – Australia (Western Australia)
- Tamopsis nanutarrae B. Baehr & M. Baehr, 1989 – Australia (Western Australia)
- Tamopsis occidentalis B. Baehr & M. Baehr, 1987 – Australia (Western Australia)
- Tamopsis perthensis B. Baehr & M. Baehr, 1987 – Australia (Western Australia)
- Tamopsis petricola B. Baehr & M. Baehr, 1995 – Australia (Queensland)
- Tamopsis piankai B. Baehr & M. Baehr, 1993 – Australia (Western Australia)
- Tamopsis platycephala B. Baehr & M. Baehr, 1987 – Australia (Queensland)
- Tamopsis pseudocircumvidens B. Baehr & M. Baehr, 1987 – Australia (Western Australia, South Australia, Northern Territory)
- Tamopsis queenslandica B. Baehr & M. Baehr, 1987 – Australia (Queensland, New South Wales)
- Tamopsis raveni B. Baehr & M. Baehr, 1987 – Australia (Queensland, South Australia)
- Tamopsis reevesbyana B. Baehr & M. Baehr, 1987 – Australia (Western Australia, South Australia)
- Tamopsis riverinae B. Baehr & M. Baehr, 1993 – Australia (New South Wales)
- Tamopsis rossi B. Baehr & M. Baehr, 1987 – Australia (Western Australia)
- Tamopsis transiens B. Baehr & M. Baehr, 1992 – Australia (Western Australia, Northern Territory, Victoria)
- Tamopsis trionix B. Baehr & M. Baehr, 1987 – Australia (Queensland)
- Tamopsis tropica B. Baehr & M. Baehr, 1987 – Australia (Northern Territory, Queensland)
- Tamopsis tweedensis B. Baehr & M. Baehr, 1987 – Australia (Queensland, New South Wales)
- Tamopsis warialdae B. Baehr & M. Baehr, 1998 – Australia (New South Wales)
- Tamopsis wau M. Baehr & B. Baehr, 1993 – New Guinea
- Tamopsis weiri B. Baehr & M. Baehr, 1995 – Australia (Western Australia)
