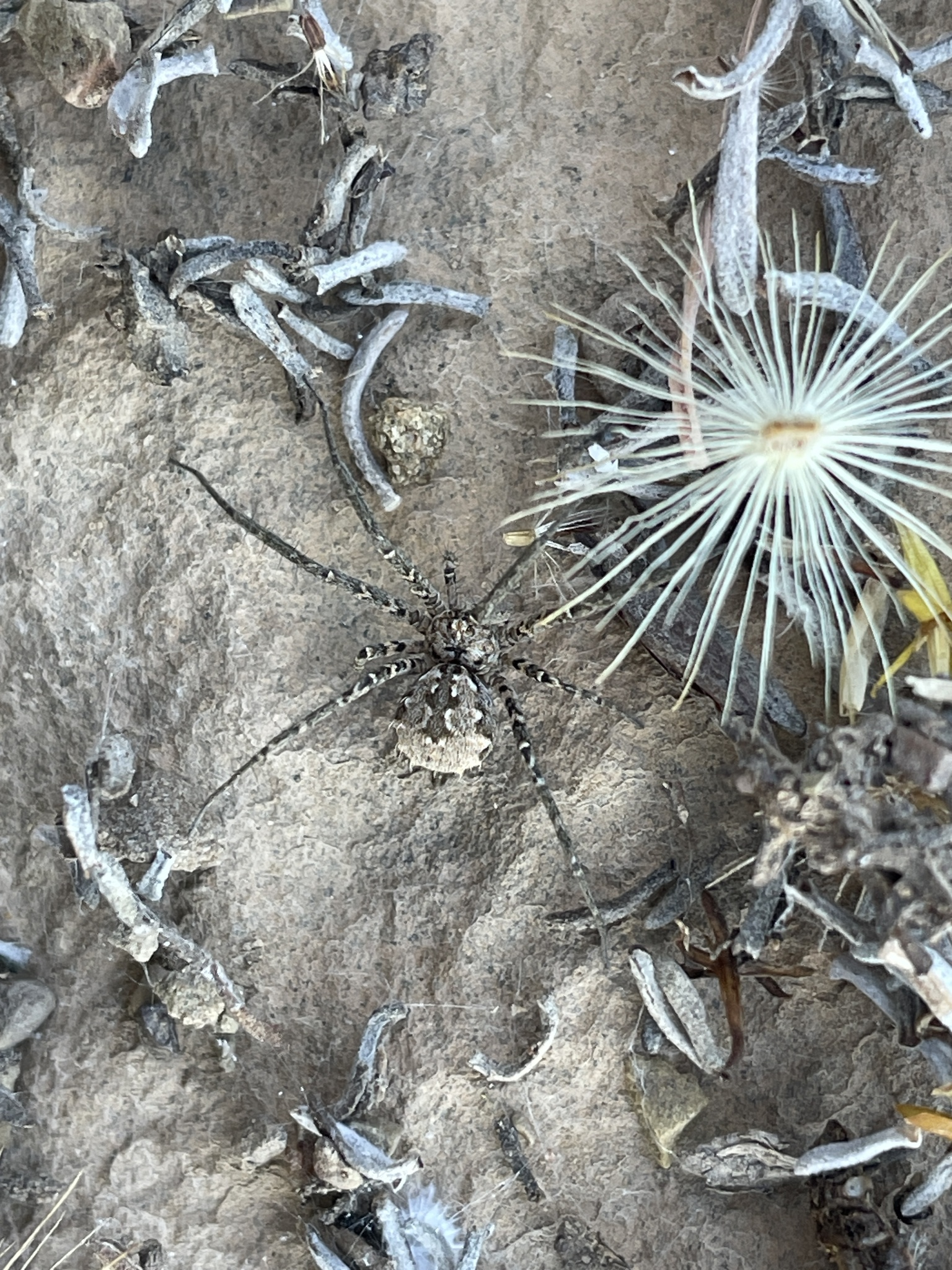
- T. arida

Scientific classification
- Kingdom: Animalia
- Phylum: Arthropoda
- Subphylum: Chelicerata
- Class: Arachnida
- Order: Araneae
- Infraorder: Araneomorphae
- Family: Hersiliidae
- Genus: Tyrotama
- Species: T. arida

Binomial name
- Tyrotama arida (Smithers, 1945)

Synonyms
- Tama arida Smithers, 1945; Tama obscura Smithers, 1945

= Tyrotama arida =

Cape Arid Long Spinneret Ground Spider

Species of spider

Tyrotama arida is a species of spider in the family Hersiliidae. It is endemic to South Africa and is commonly known as the Cape Arid Long Spinneret Ground Spider.

== Distribution ==
Tyrotama arida is found in two South African provinces at altitudes ranging from 78 to 1,850 m above sea level.

== Habitat and ecology ==
The species occurs in multiple biomes including Fynbos, Desert, Grassland, Nama Karoo, and Savanna biomes. It is collected under flat stones on rocky areas and is frequently found in pitfall traps.

This species constructs circular webs under flat stones, with the web attached to the stone's underside and hanging like a veil. The entrance is positioned on the northern side. Females have been observed with multiple egg sacs congregated together and covered with small stone chips.

== Description ==
Tyrotama arida is known from both sexes and serves as the type species for the genus Tyrotama. Like other members of the genus, it exhibits shorter legs compared to Hersilia species.

== Conservation ==
Tyrotama arida is listed as Least Concern by the South African National Biodiversity Institute due to its wide distribution range. The species is protected in three protected areas including the Cederberg Wilderness Area and Richtersveld Transfrontier National Park.

== Taxonomy ==
The species was originally described by Smithers in 1945 as Tama arida from Montagu in the Western Cape. Foord & Dippenaar-Schoeman (2005) transferred it to Tyrotama and synonymized Tama obscura Smithers, 1945 with this species.
