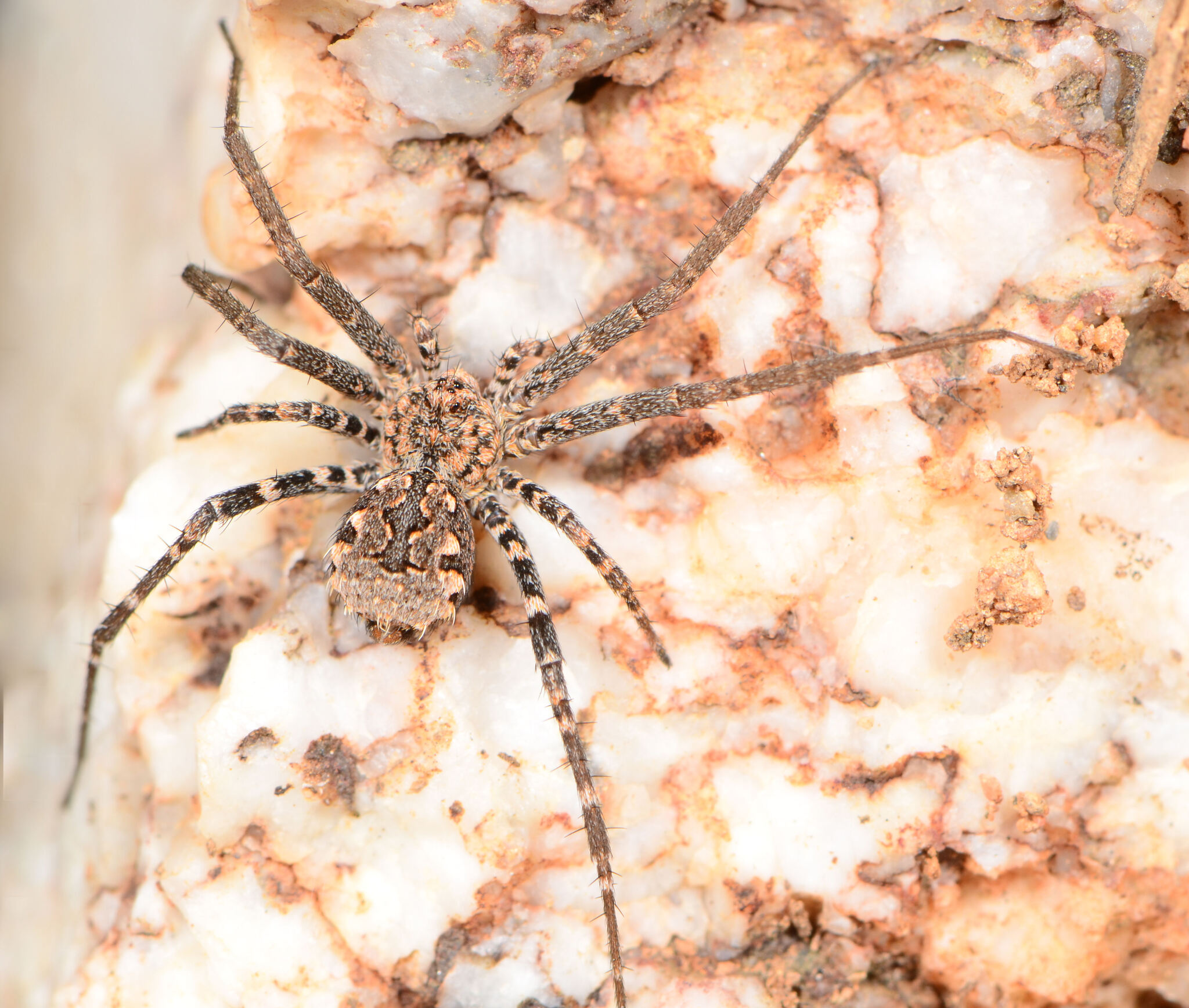
- Male
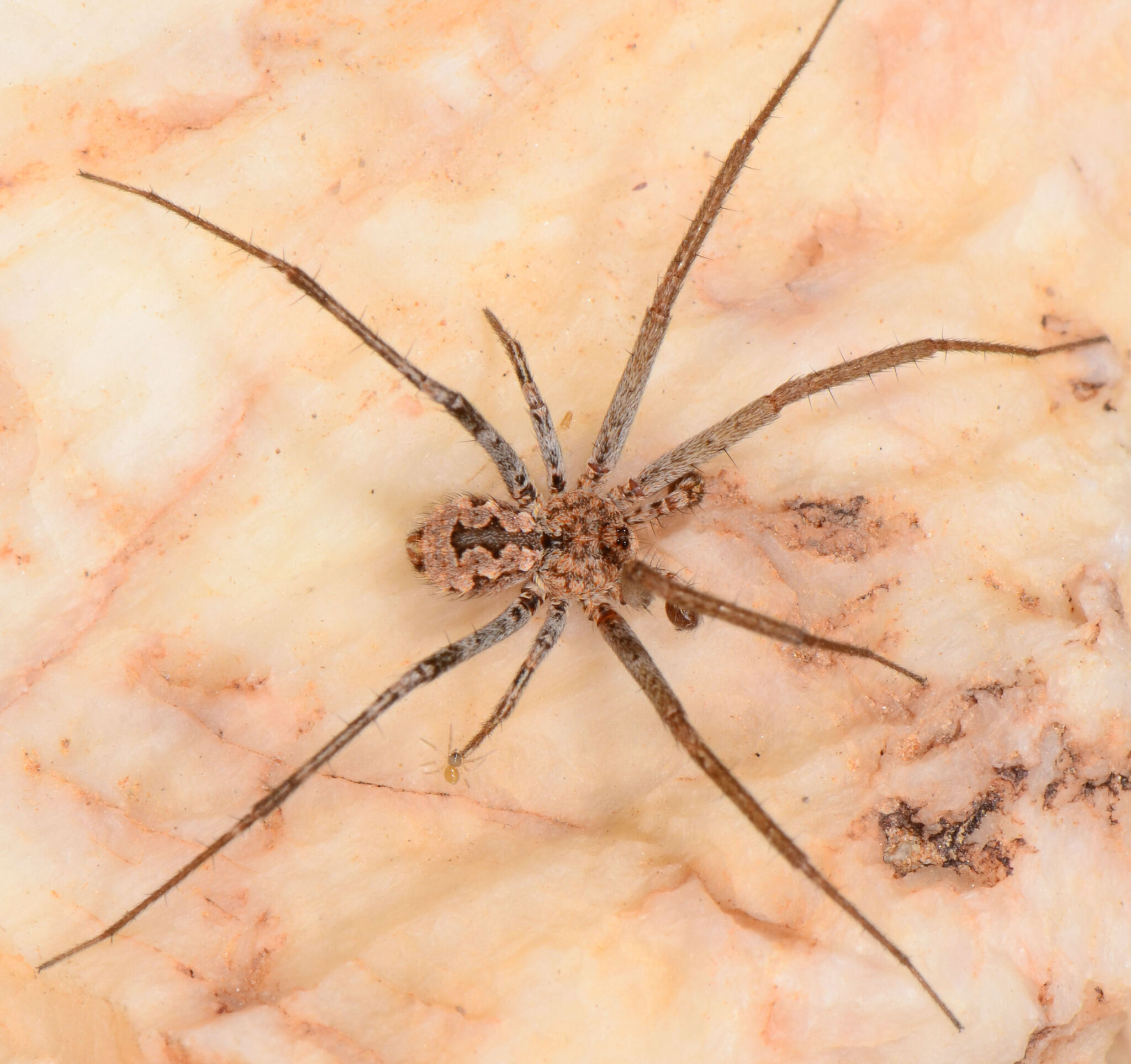
- Male

Scientific classification
- Kingdom: Animalia
- Phylum: Arthropoda
- Subphylum: Chelicerata
- Class: Arachnida
- Order: Araneae
- Infraorder: Araneomorphae
- Family: Hersiliidae
- Genus: Tyrotama
- Species: T. abyssus

Binomial name
- Tyrotama abyssus Foord & Dippenaar-Schoeman, 2005

= Tyrotama abyssus =

Swartberg Two-tailed Ground Spider

Species of spider

Tyrotama abyssus is a species of spider in the family Hersiliidae. It is a southern African endemic and is commonly known as the Swartberg Two-tailed Ground Spider.

== Distribution ==
Tyrotama abyssus occurs in Lesotho and South Africa. In South Africa, the species is presently known from two provinces at altitudes ranging from 172 to 1,706 m above sea level.

== Habitat ==
The species is found in Nama Karoo and Succulent Karoo biomes. It constructs circular webs under stones, with the web attached to the underside of the stone and hanging like a veil. The web structure is distinctive, appearing veil-like as it hangs from the stone's underside, with access provided through a northern-facing entrance.

== Description ==
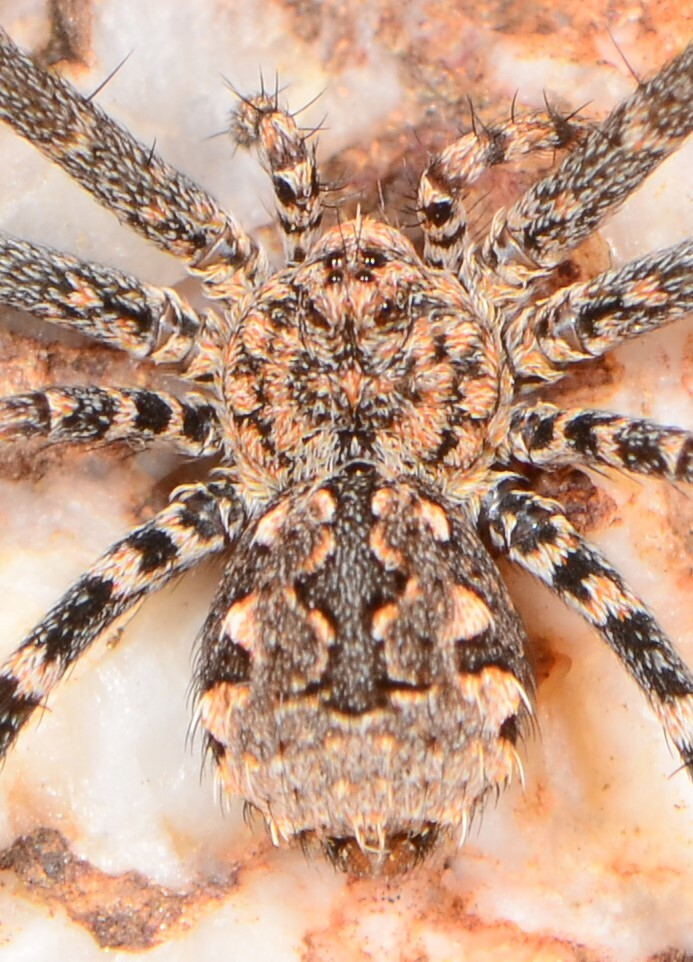
male

Tyrotama abyssus is known only from females. Like other members of the genus Tyrotama, it possesses shorter legs compared to the genus Hersilia.

== Conservation ==
Tyrotama abyssus is listed as Least Concern by the South African National Biodiversity Institute despite its potentially limited collection records. The species is protected in six protected areas including Karoo National Park, Swartberg Nature Reserve, and Namaqua National Park. No significant threats have been identified.

== Taxonomy ==
The species was described in 2005 by Foord & Dippenaar-Schoeman from Gamkaskloof in the Swartberg Nature Reserve, Western Cape.
