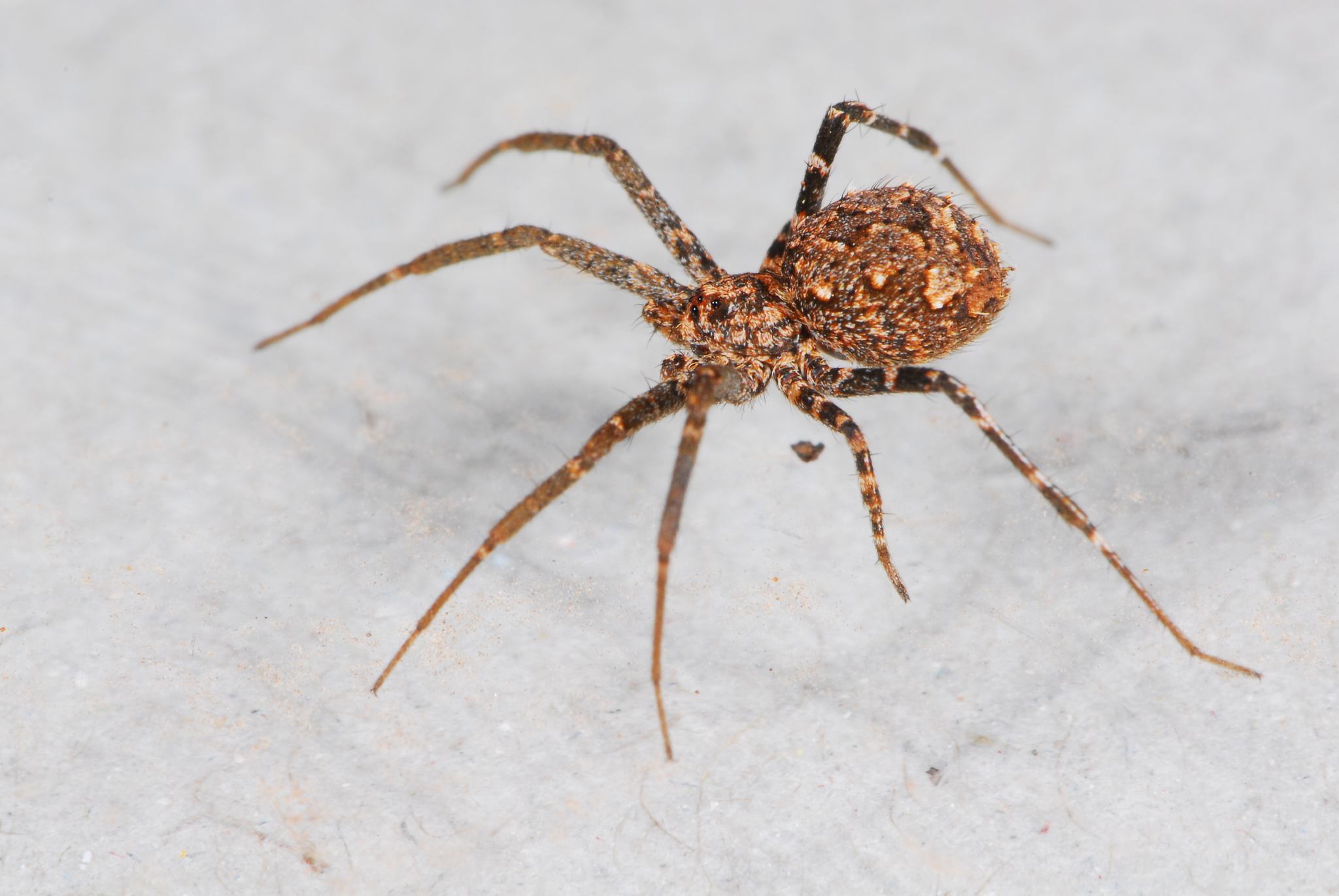
- Female
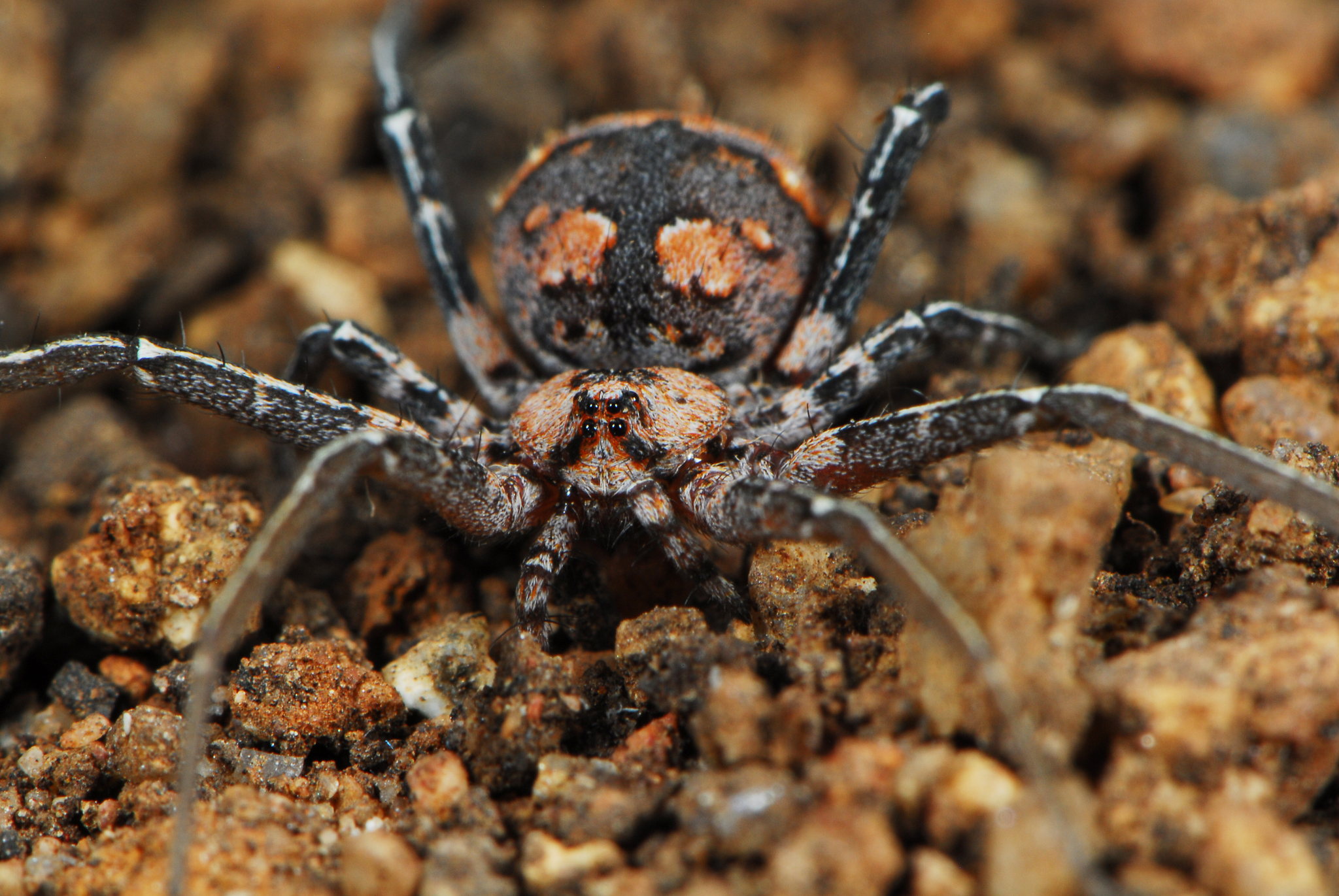
- Female

Scientific classification
- Kingdom: Animalia
- Phylum: Arthropoda
- Subphylum: Chelicerata
- Class: Arachnida
- Order: Araneae
- Infraorder: Araneomorphae
- Family: Hersiliidae
- Genus: Tyrotama
- Species: T. australis

Binomial name
- Tyrotama australis (Simon, 1893)

Synonyms
- Hersiliola australis Simon, 1893

= Tyrotama australis =

Hanover Long Spinneret Ground Spider

Species of spider

Tyrotama australis is a species of spider in the family Hersiliidae. It is a southern African endemic and is commonly known as the Hanover Long Spinneret Ground Spider.

== Distribution ==
Tyrotama australis occurs in Botswana, Lesotho, and South Africa. In South Africa, the species is found in six provinces at altitudes ranging from 54 to 1,765 m above sea level.

== Habitat ==
The species occurs in multiple biomes including Desert, Fynbos, Grassland, Nama Karoo, and Savanna biomes. It is commonly found under stones and is frequently collected in pitfall traps.

== Description ==
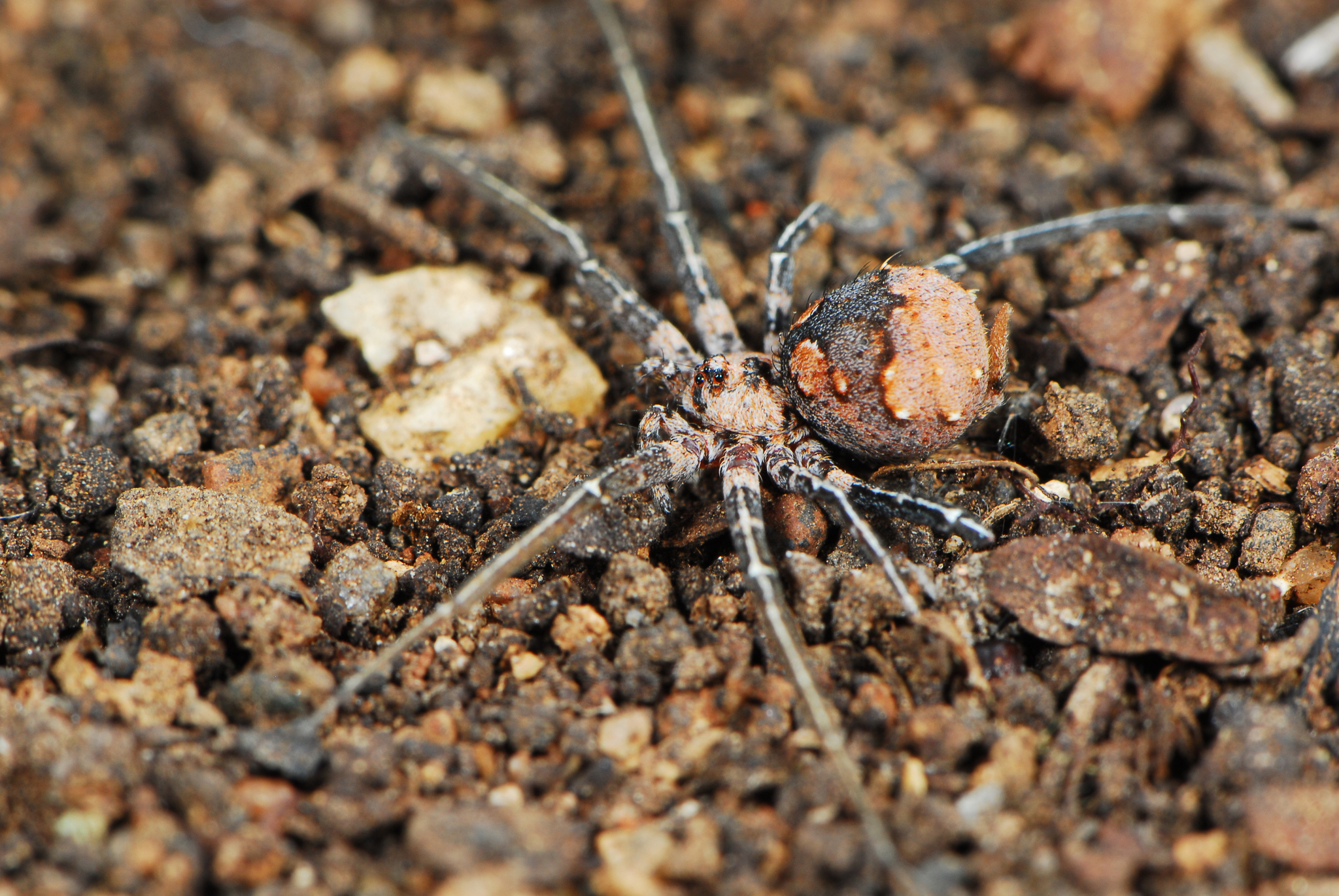
female

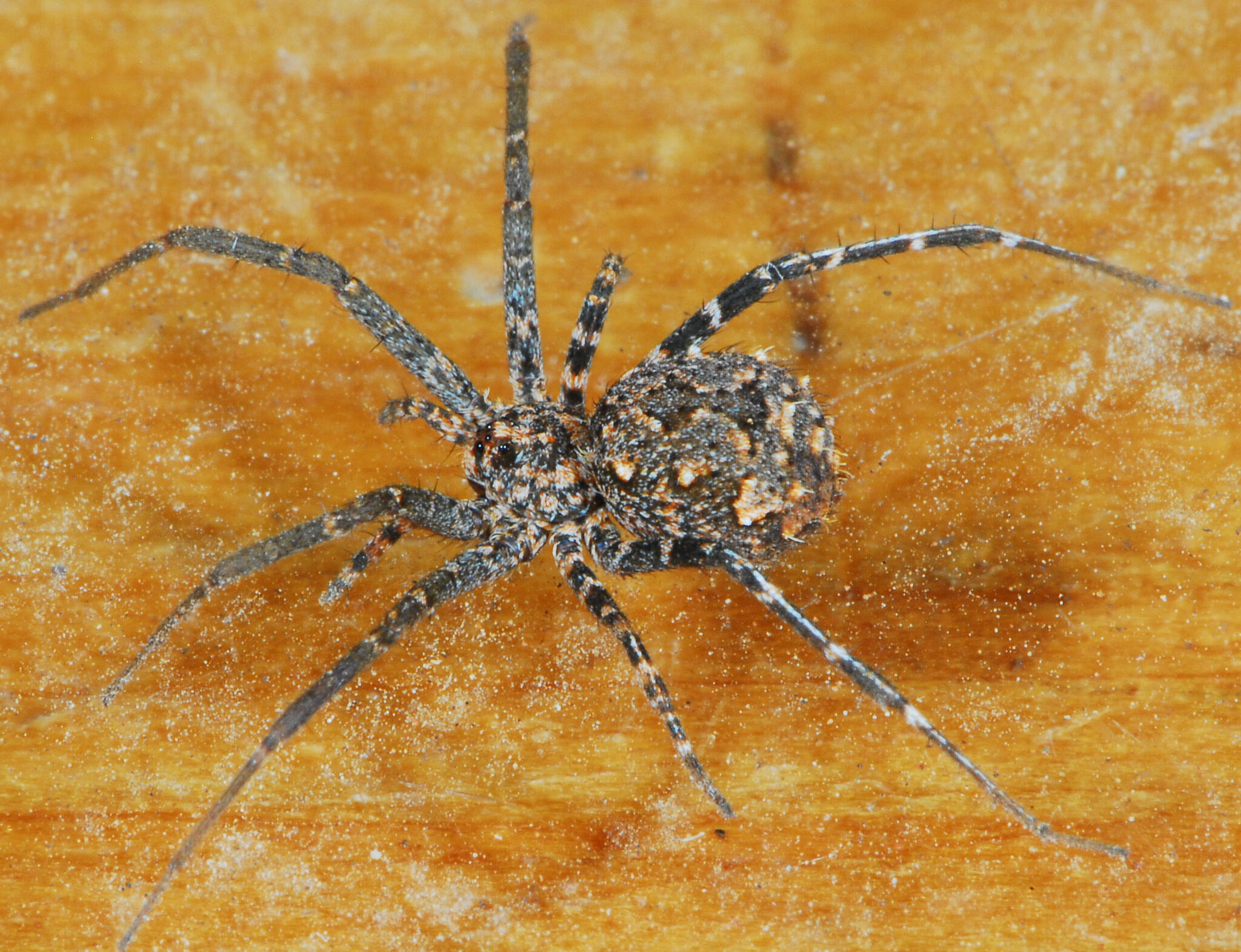
female

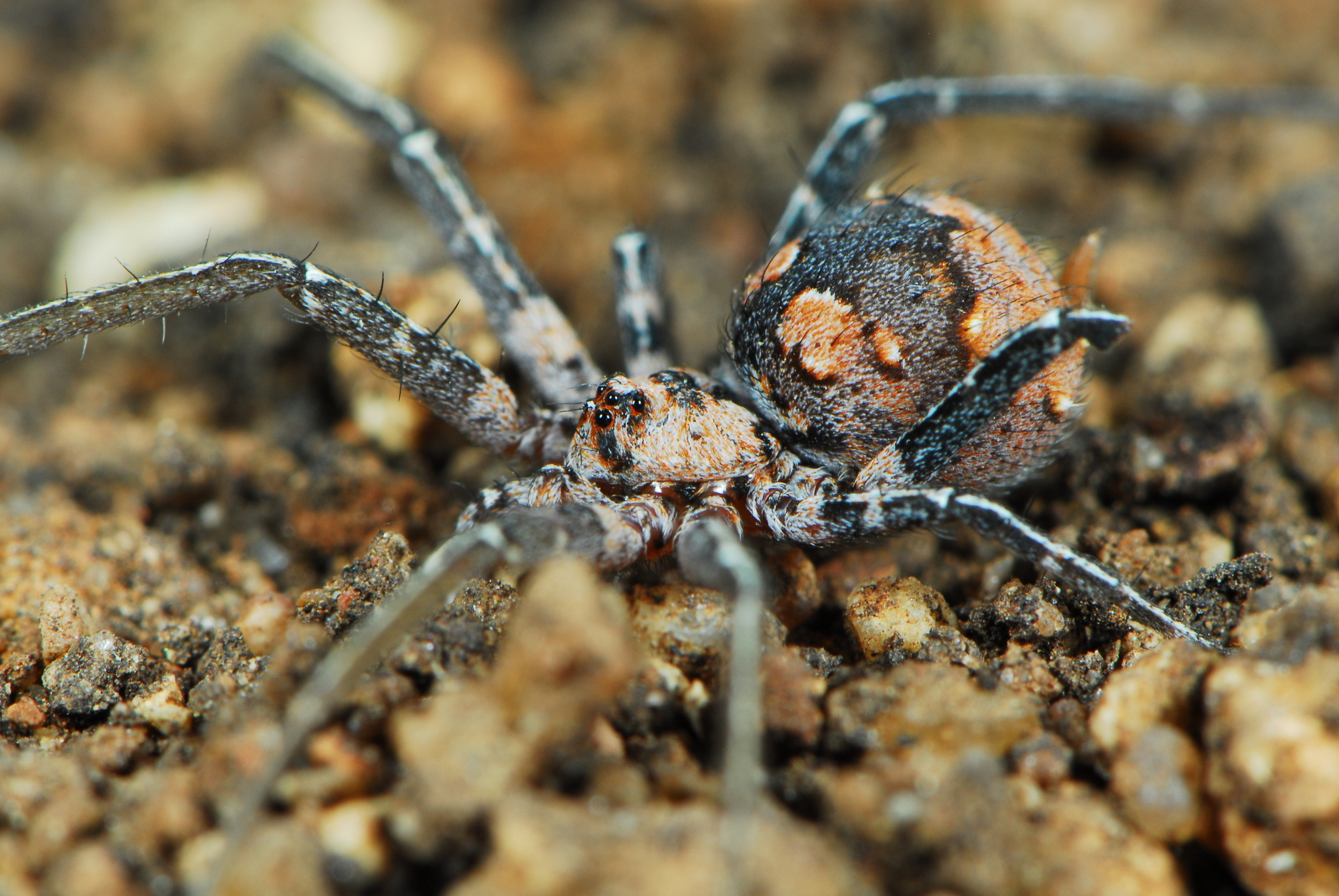
female

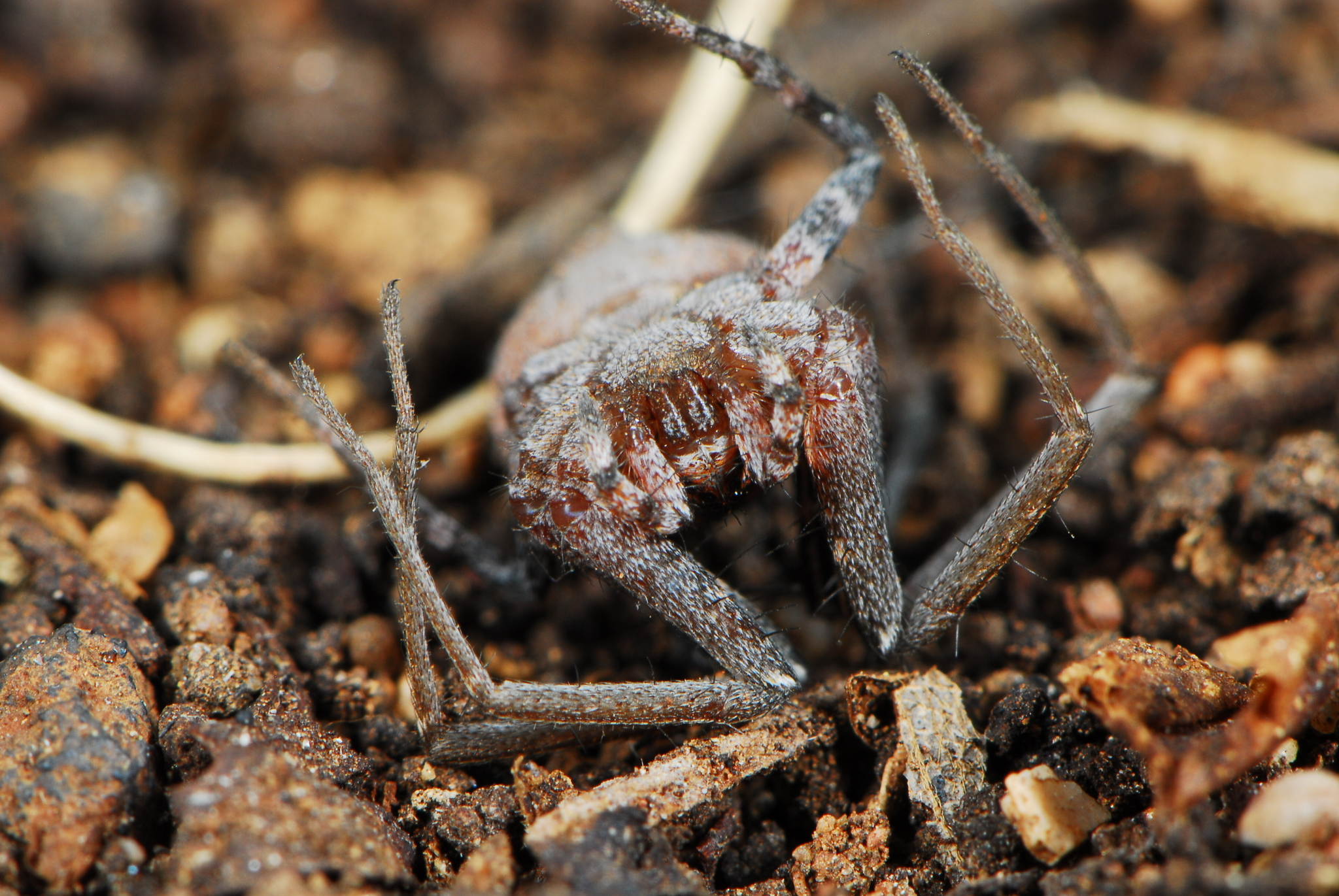
female

Tyrotama australis is known from both sexes. Like other members of the genus Tyrotama, it exhibits shorter legs compared to Hersilia species.

== Ecology ==
This species constructs circular webs under stones, with the web attached to the stone's underside and hanging like a veil. The entrance is positioned on the northern side. Males are collected between February and April, while females are found between November and February.

== Conservation ==
Tyrotama australis is listed as Least Concern by the South African National Biodiversity Institute due to its wide distribution range across multiple countries and provinces. The species is protected in nine protected areas and faces no significant threats.

== Taxonomy ==
The species was originally described by Eugène Simon in 1893 as Hersiliola australis from Hanover, Poortjiesfontein. Foord & Dippenaar-Schoeman (2005) transferred it to the genus Tyrotama.
