= Murricia uva =

Scientific classification
- Domain: Eukaryota
- Kingdom: Animalia
- Phylum: Arthropoda
- Subphylum: Chelicerata
- Class: Arachnida
- Order: Araneae
- Infraorder: Araneomorphae
- Family: Hersiliidae
- Genus: Murricia
- Species: M. uva

Binomial name
- Murricia uva Foord, 2008

Species of spider

Murricia uva is a species of hersiliid in the spider family Hersiliidae. It is found in a range from Cameroon to Uganda.
