= Murricia crinifera =

Scientific classification
- Kingdom: Animalia
- Phylum: Arthropoda
- Subphylum: Chelicerata
- Class: Arachnida
- Order: Araneae
- Infraorder: Araneomorphae
- Family: Hersiliidae
- Genus: Murricia
- Species: M. crinifera

Binomial name
- Murricia crinifera Baehr & Baehr, 1993

Species of spider

Murricia crinifera, is a species of spider of the genus Murricia. It is endemic to Sri Lanka. The species was described with a female specimen collected from Kandy, Galle and Colombo.
