= Tyrotama incerta =

Nieuwoudtville Long Spinneret Ground Spider

Conservation status
- Least Concern (SANBI Red List)

Scientific classification
- Kingdom: Animalia
- Phylum: Arthropoda
- Subphylum: Chelicerata
- Class: Arachnida
- Order: Araneae
- Infraorder: Araneomorphae
- Family: Hersiliidae
- Genus: Tyrotama
- Species: T. incerta

Binomial name
- Tyrotama incerta (Tucker, 1920)

Synonyms
- Tama incerta Tucker, 1920

Species of spider

Tyrotama incerta is a species of spider in the family Hersiliidae. It is a southern African endemic and is commonly known as the Nieuwoudtville Long Spinneret Ground Spider.

== Distribution ==
Tyrotama incerta occurs in Namibia and South Africa. In South Africa, the species is found in two provinces at altitudes ranging from 83 to 1,167 m above sea level.

== Habitat ==
The species occurs in Nama Karoo and Fynbos biomes. It constructs circular webs under stones on dry rocky northern and western slopes, typically in rock-on-rock situations. The web hangs from the stone's underside like a veil, with the entrance positioned on the northern side.

== Description ==
Tyrotama incerta is known only from females. Like other members of the genus Tyrotama, it exhibits the characteristic shorter legs compared to Hersilia.

== Conservation ==
Tyrotama incerta is listed as Least Concern by the South African National Biodiversity Institute. Although the species has lost some habitat to crop cultivation on the Bokkeveld Escarpment and around Clanwilliam, the majority of its range remains in natural condition. The species is protected in two protected areas: Oorlogskloof Nature Reserve and Karoo National Park.

== Taxonomy ==
The species was originally described by Tucker in 1920 as Tama incerta from Nieuwoudtville in the Northern Cape. Foord & Dippenaar-Schoeman (2005) transferred it to the genus Tyrotama.
