= Hersiliola versicolor =

Scientific classification
- Domain: Eukaryota
- Kingdom: Animalia
- Phylum: Arthropoda
- Subphylum: Chelicerata
- Class: Arachnida
- Order: Araneae
- Infraorder: Araneomorphae
- Family: Hersiliidae
- Genus: Hersiliola
- Species: H. versicolor

Binomial name
- Hersiliola versicolor (Blackwall, 1865)

Synonyms
- Hersilia versicolor Blackwall, 1865

Species of spider

Hersiliola versicolor is a species of spiders of the family Hersiliidae that lives in Cape Verde. It was first described by John Blackwall in 1865 as Hersilia versicolor. The females have a total length of 3.75-4.58 mm.
