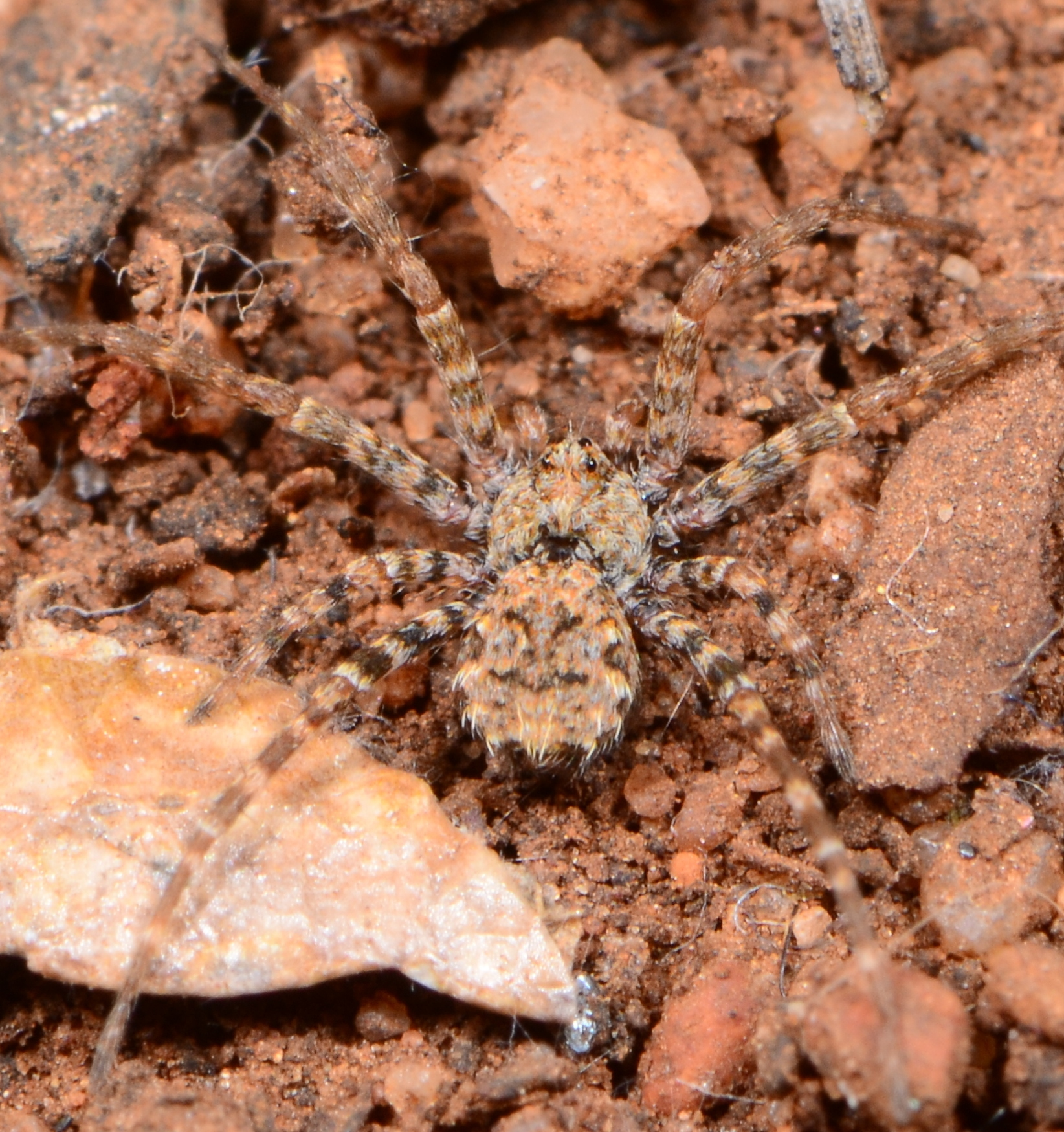
- Female
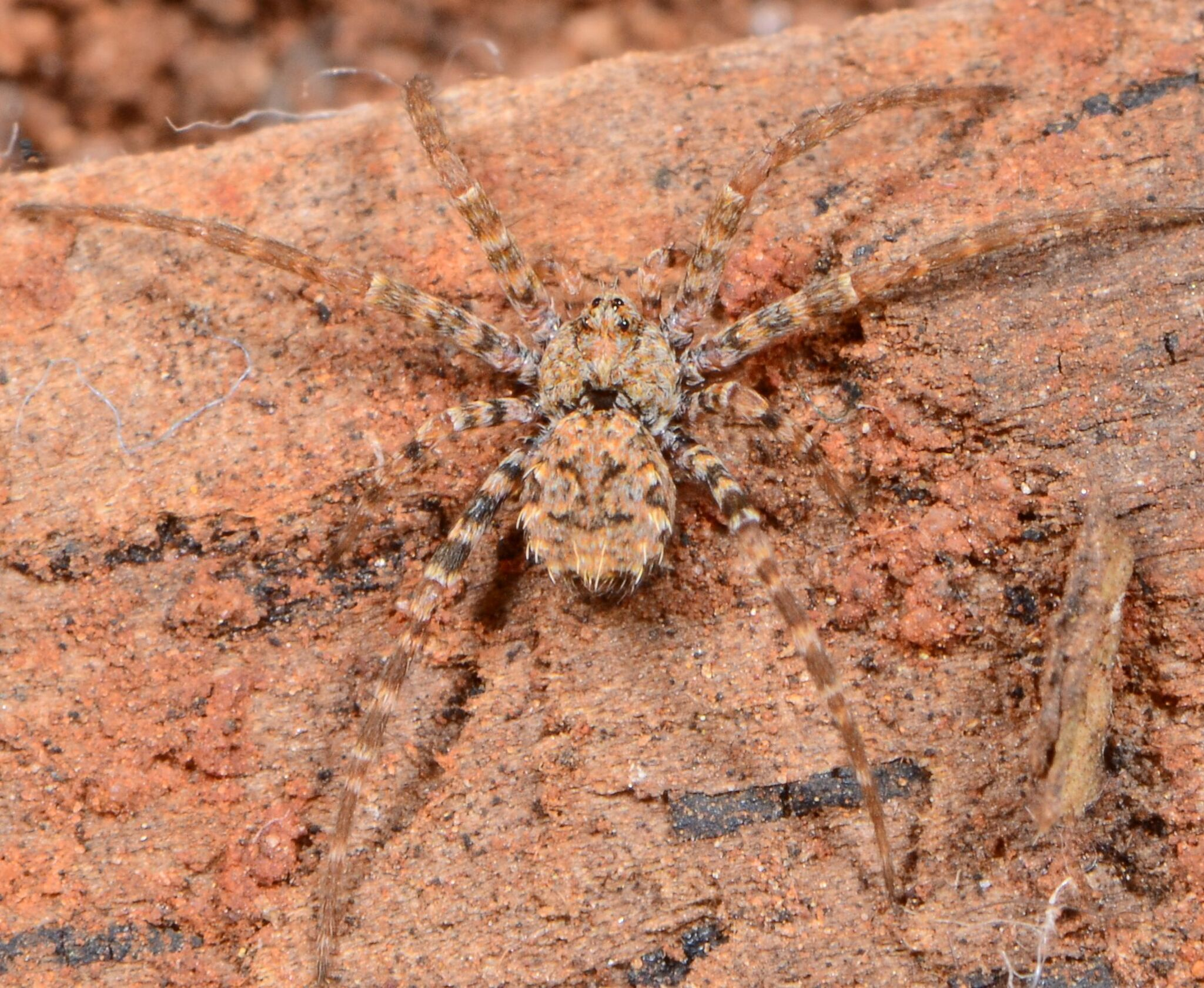
- Female

Scientific classification
- Kingdom: Animalia
- Phylum: Arthropoda
- Subphylum: Chelicerata
- Class: Arachnida
- Order: Araneae
- Infraorder: Araneomorphae
- Family: Hersiliidae
- Genus: Tyrotama
- Species: T. bicava

Binomial name
- Tyrotama bicava (Smithers, 1945)

Synonyms
- Tama bicava Smithers, 1945

= Tyrotama bicava =

Species of spider

Tyrotama bicava is a species of spider in the family Hersiliidae. It is endemic to Southern Africa.

== Distribution ==
Tyrotama bicava occurs in Angola, Namibia, and South Africa. In South Africa, the species is known only from one locality in Marble Hall, Limpopo, at an altitude of 895 m above sea level.

== Habitat ==
The species occurs in Savanna biomes and constructs circular webs under stones. The web is attached to the stone's underside and hangs like a veil, with the entrance positioned on the northern side.

== Description ==
Tyrotama bicava is known from both sexes. Like other members of the genus Tyrotama, it exhibits the characteristic shorter legs compared to Hersilia species.

== Conservation ==
Tyrotama bicava is listed as Least Concern by the South African National Biodiversity Institute due to its wide distribution range across multiple African countries, despite its limited known occurrence in South Africa. No significant threats have been identified.

== Taxonomy ==
The species was originally described by Smithers in 1945 as Tama bicava from Namibia. Foord & Dippenaar-Schoeman (2005) transferred it to the genus Tyrotama.
