= Murricia =

Scientific classification
- Kingdom: Animalia
- Phylum: Arthropoda
- Subphylum: Chelicerata
- Class: Arachnida
- Order: Araneae
- Infraorder: Araneomorphae
- Family: Hersiliidae
- Genus: Murricia; Simon, 1882

Species
- 6, see text

Genus of spiders

Murricia is a genus of tree trunk spiders that was first described by Eugène Simon in 1882.

== Species ==
As of May 2019 it contains six species:

- Murricia cornuta Baehr & Baehr, 1993 – Singapore
- Murricia crinifera Baehr & Baehr, 1993 – Sri Lanka
- Murricia hyderabadensis Javed & Tampal, 2010 – India
- Murricia trapezodica Sen, Saha & Raychaudhuri, 2010 – India
- Murricia triangularis Baehr & Baehr, 1993 – India
- Murricia uva Foord, 2008 – Cameroon to Uganda
