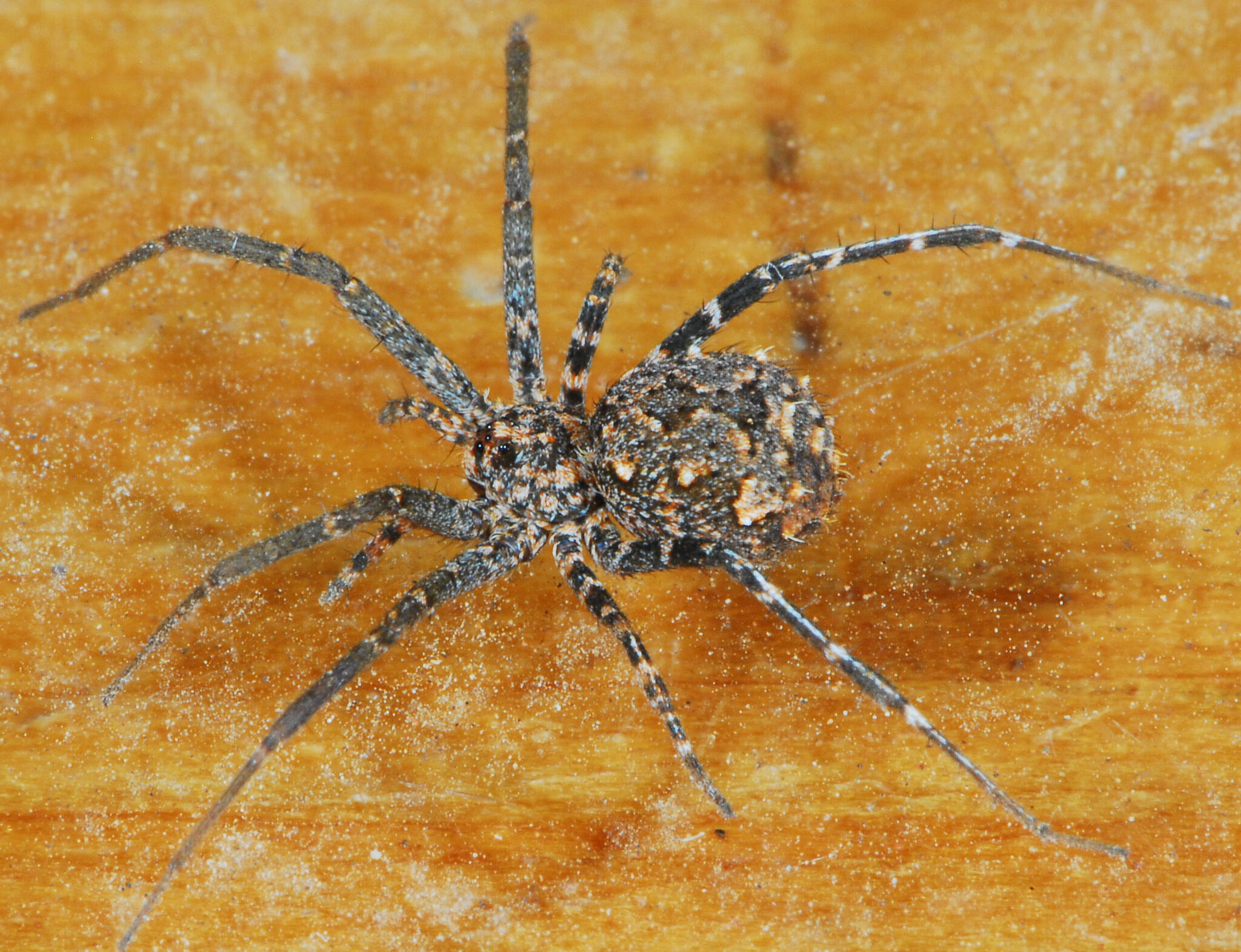
- Female T. australis
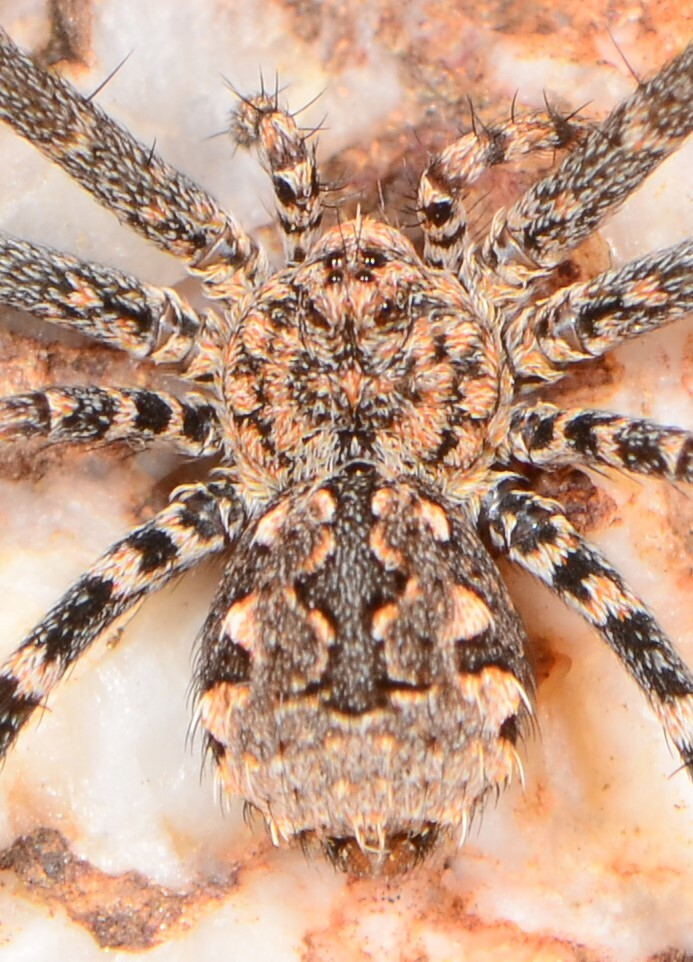
- Male T. abyssus

Scientific classification
- Kingdom: Animalia
- Phylum: Arthropoda
- Subphylum: Chelicerata
- Class: Arachnida
- Order: Araneae
- Infraorder: Araneomorphae
- Family: Hersiliidae
- Genus: Tyrotama; Foord & Dippenaar-Schoeman, 2005

Type species
- T. arida (Smithers, 1945)

Species
- 8, see text

= Tyrotama =

Genus of spiders

Tyrotama is a genus of African tree trunk spiders that was first described by S. H. Foord & A. S. Dippenaar-Schoeman in 2005.

== Species ==
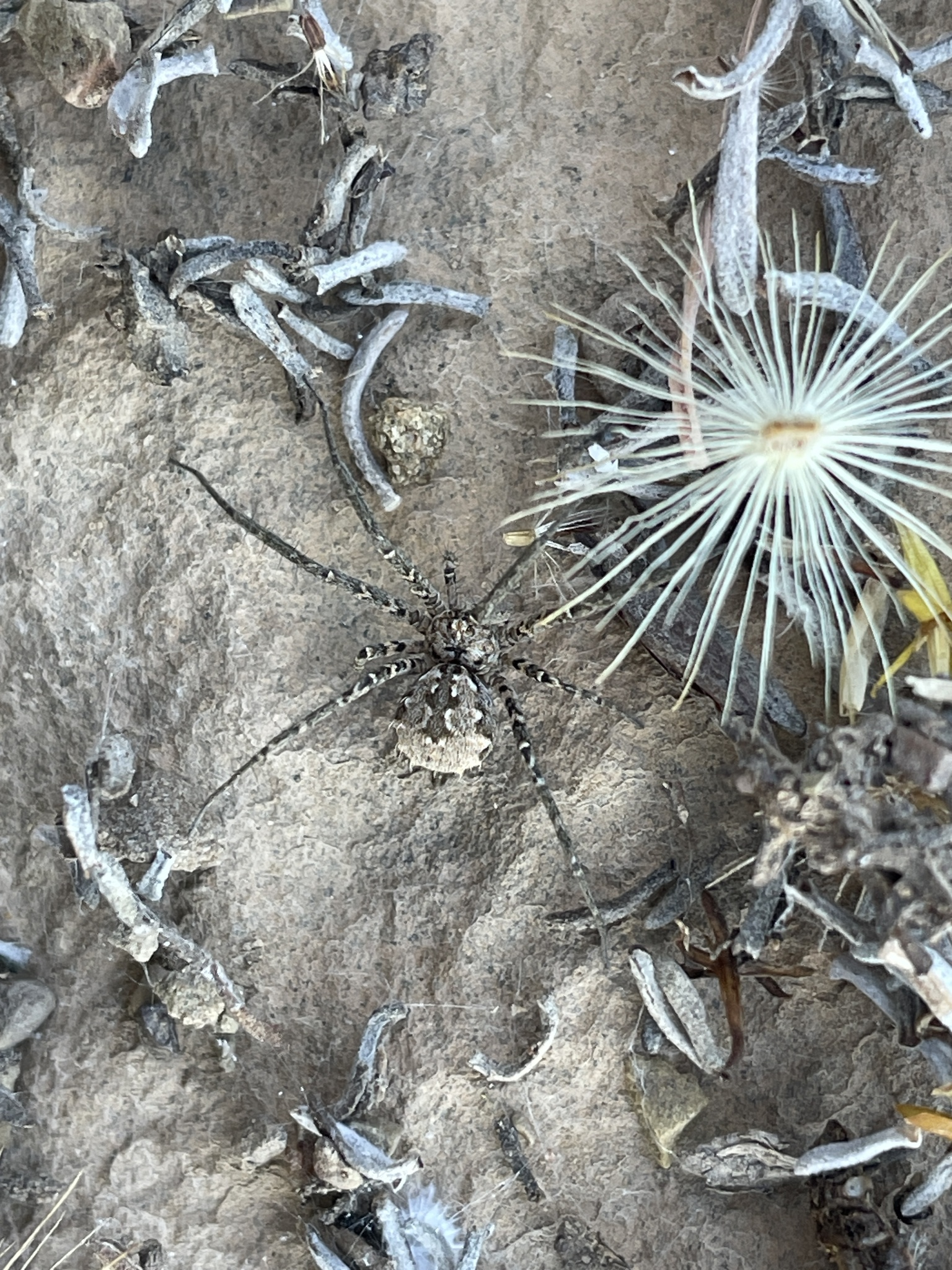
T. arida

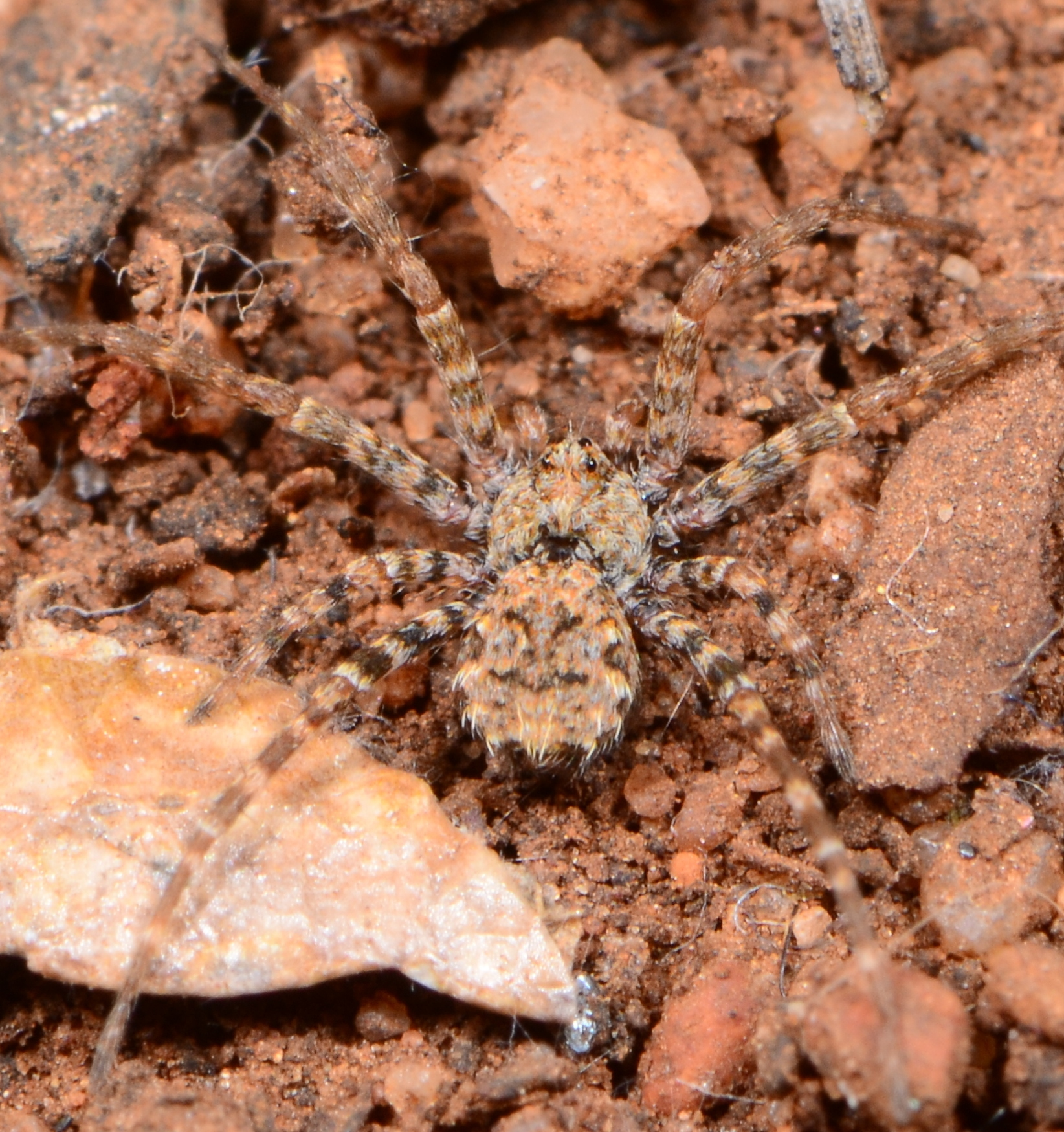
female T. bicava

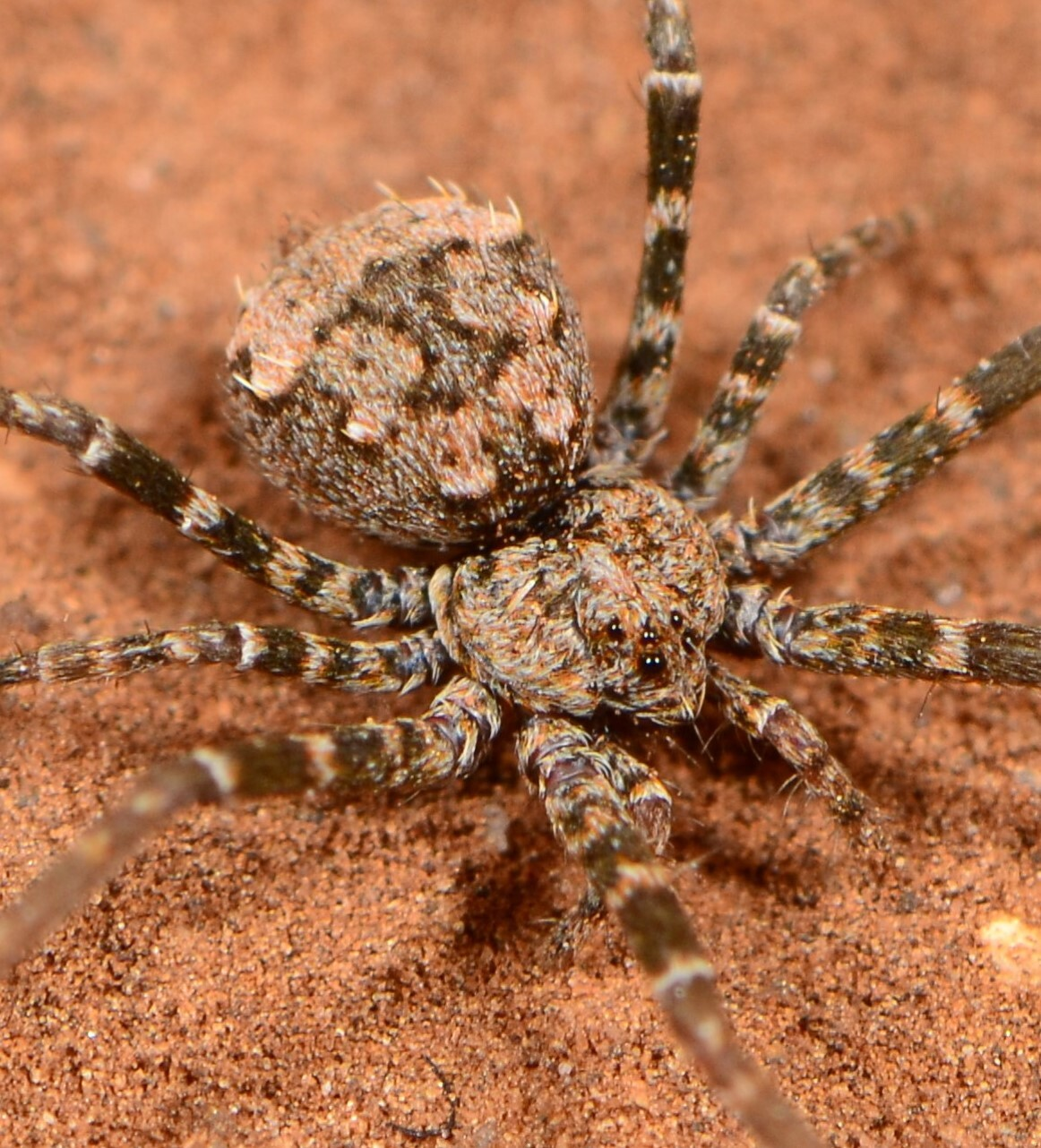
female T. soutpansbergensis

As of October 2025, this genus includes eight species:

- Tyrotama abyssus Foord & Dippenaar-Schoeman, 2005 – South Africa, Lesotho
- Tyrotama arida (Smithers, 1945) – South Africa (type species)
- Tyrotama australis (Simon, 1893) – Botswana, South Africa, Lesotho
- Tyrotama bicava (Smithers, 1945) – Angola, Namibia, South Africa
- Tyrotama fragilis (Lawrence, 1928) – Angola, Namibia
- Tyrotama incerta (Tucker, 1920) – Namibia, South Africa
- Tyrotama soutpansbergensis Foord & Dippenaar-Schoeman, 2005 – South Africa
- Tyrotama taris Foord & Dippenaar-Schoeman, 2005 – South Africa
