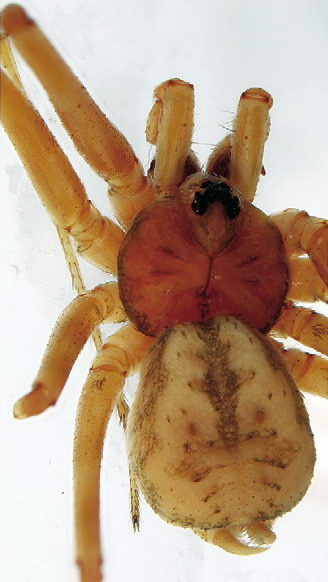
- O. pallida (male)
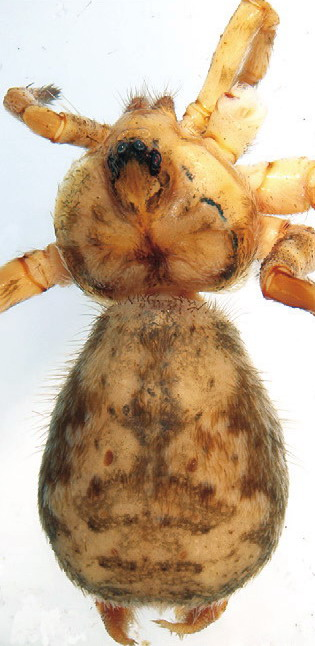
- O. pallida (female)

Scientific classification
- Kingdom: Animalia
- Phylum: Arthropoda
- Subphylum: Chelicerata
- Class: Arachnida
- Order: Araneae
- Infraorder: Araneomorphae
- Family: Hersiliidae
- Genus: Ovtsharenkoia; Marusik & Fet, 2009
- Species: O. pallida

Binomial name
- Ovtsharenkoia pallida (Kroneberg, 1875)

= Ovtsharenkoia =

Genus of spiders

Ovtsharenkoia is a monotypic genus of Asian tree trunk spiders containing the single species, Ovtsharenkoia pallida. It was first described by Yuri M. Marusik & Victor R. Fet in 2009, and has only been found in Central Asia.
