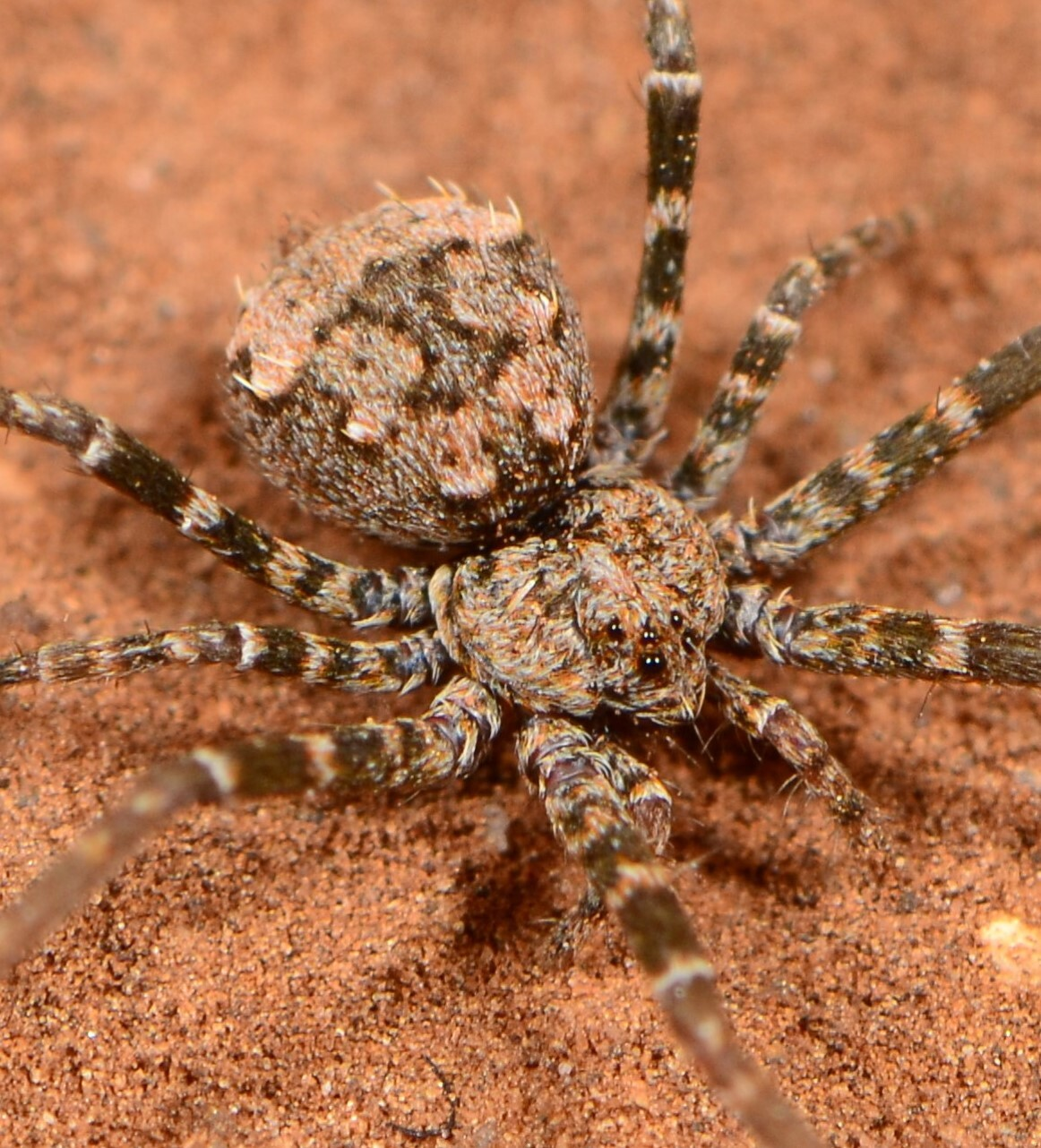
- Female
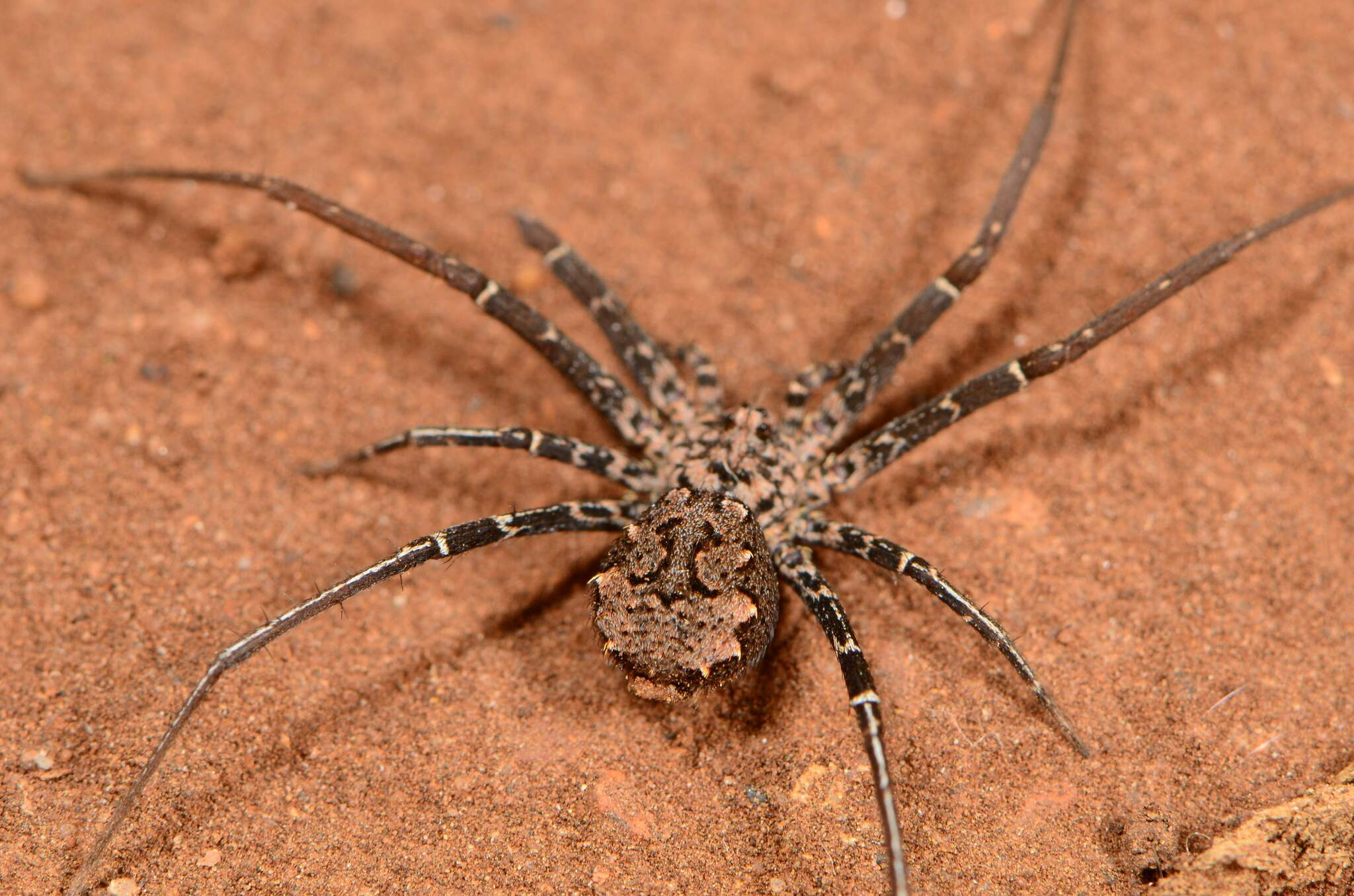
- Female

Scientific classification
- Kingdom: Animalia
- Phylum: Arthropoda
- Subphylum: Chelicerata
- Class: Arachnida
- Order: Araneae
- Infraorder: Araneomorphae
- Family: Hersiliidae
- Genus: Tyrotama
- Species: T. soutpansbergensis

Binomial name
- Tyrotama soutpansbergensis Foord & Dippenaar-Schoeman, 2005

= Tyrotama soutpansbergensis =

Soutpansberg Long Spinneret Ground Spider

Species of spider

Tyrotama soutpansbergensis is a species of spider in the family Hersiliidae. It is endemic to Limpopo province in South Africa and is commonly known as the Soutpansberg long spinneret ground spider.

== Distribution ==
Tyrotama soutpansbergensis has a restricted distribution in Limpopo province at altitudes ranging from 710 to 1,325 m above sea level. The species is known from five locations.

== Habitat ==
The species occurs in Savanna biomes and is typically found in the hot, north-facing sections of the Soutpansberg. It constructs circular webs under stones, with the web hanging from the stone's underside like a veil.

== Description ==
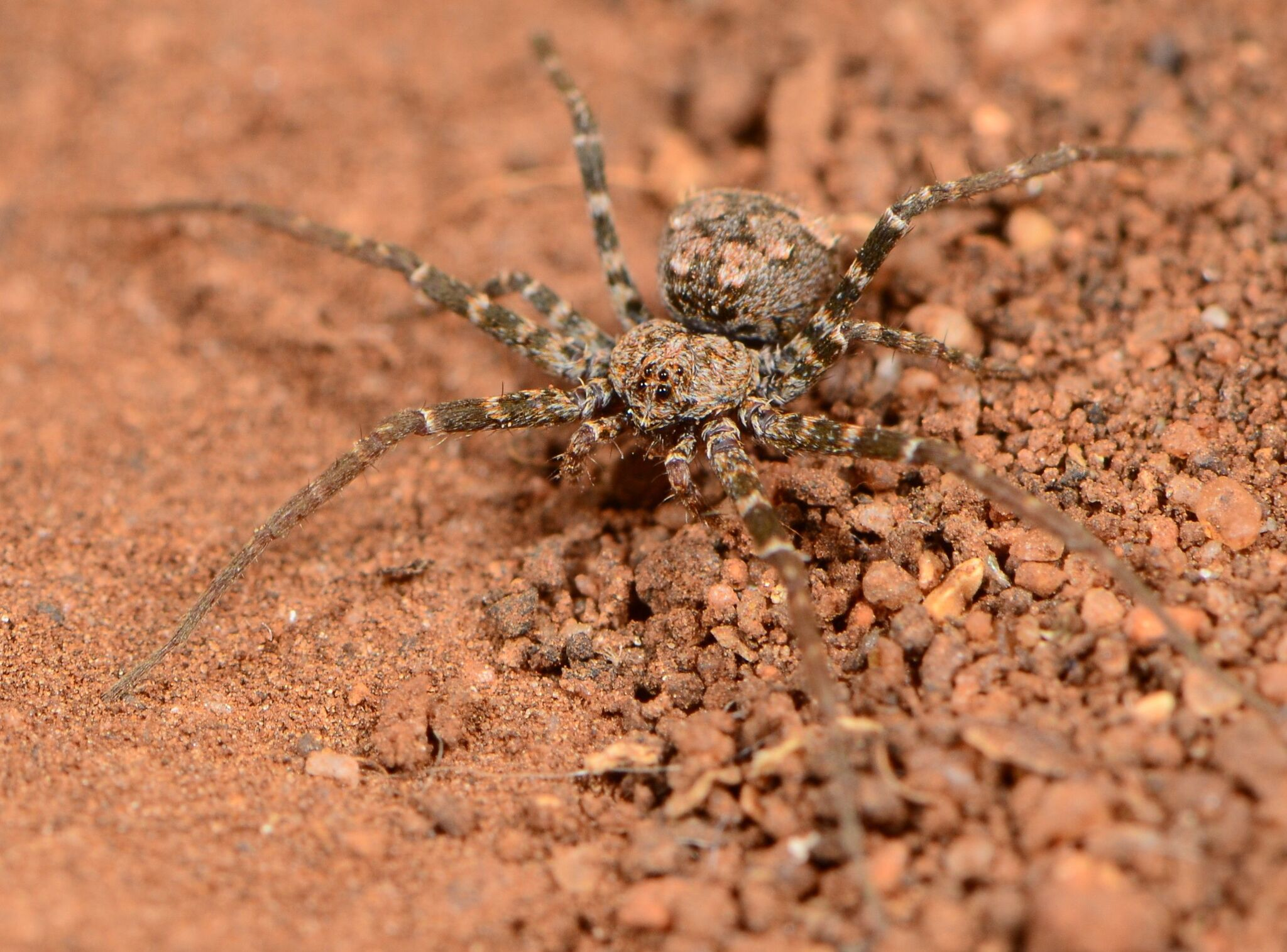
female

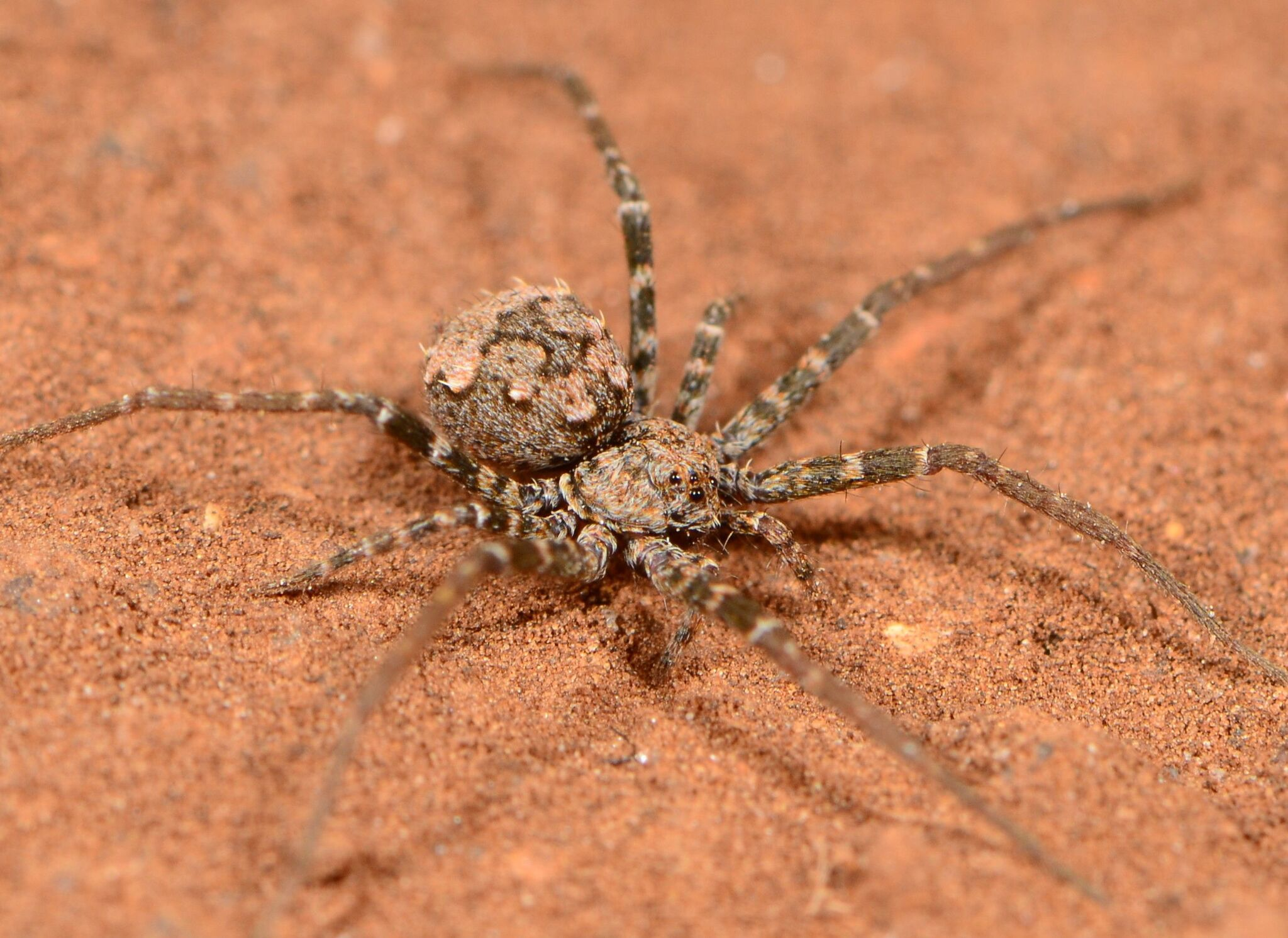
female

Tyrotama soutpansbergensis is known from both sexes. Like other members of the genus Tyrotama, it exhibits the characteristic shorter legs compared to Hersilia species.

== Conservation ==
Tyrotama soutpansbergensis is listed as Vulnerable by the South African National Biodiversity Institute. The species faces current threats from habitat loss due to infrastructure development around Polokwane and potential future threats from mining activities on the Soutpansberg. It is protected in Polokwane Nature Reserve.

== Taxonomy ==
The species was described in 2005 by Foord & Dippenaar-Schoeman from the Soutpansberg mountain range in Limpopo province.
