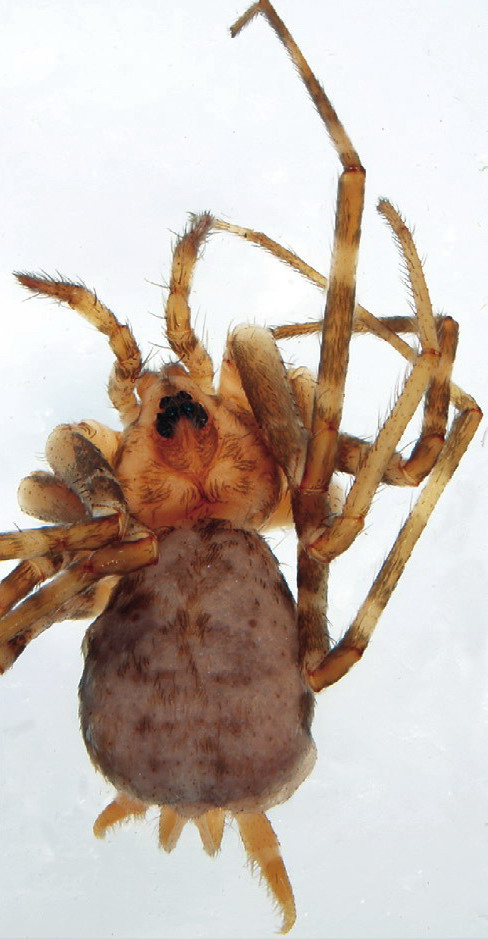
- H. esyunini (female)

Scientific classification
- Domain: Eukaryota
- Kingdom: Animalia
- Phylum: Arthropoda
- Subphylum: Chelicerata
- Class: Arachnida
- Order: Araneae
- Infraorder: Araneomorphae
- Family: Hersiliidae
- Genus: Hersiliola; Thorell, 1870

Type species
- H. macullulata (Dufour, 1831)

Species
- 12, see text

= Hersiliola =

Hersiliola Temporal range: Palaeogene–present

Genus of spiders

Hersiliola is a genus of tree trunk spiders that was first described by Tamerlan Thorell in 1870.

== Species ==
As of May 2019 it contains twelve species:

- Hersiliola afghanica Roewer, 1960 – Afghanistan
- Hersiliola artemisiae Zamani, Mirshamsi & Marusik, 2017 – Iran
- Hersiliola bayrami Danişman, Sancak, Erdek & Coşar, 2012 – Turkey
- Hersiliola eltigani El-Hennawy, 2010 – Sudan
- Hersiliola esyunini Marusik & Fet, 2009 – Uzbekistan
- Hersiliola lindbergi Marusik & Fet, 2009 – Afghanistan
- Hersiliola macullulata (Dufour, 1831) (type) – Spain, Algeria, Mali, Israel, Yemen, Iran
- Hersiliola simoni (O. Pickard-Cambridge, 1872) – Spain, Northern Africa, Middle East, Iran
- Hersiliola sternbergsi Marusik & Fet, 2009 – Turkmenistan, Uzbekistan, Iran
- Hersiliola turcica Marusik, Kunt & Yağmur, 2010 – Turkey, Iran
- Hersiliola versicolor (Blackwall, 1865) – Cape Verde Is., Canary Is.?
- Hersiliola xinjiangensis (Liang & Wang, 1989) – China
