= Tyrotama taris =

Scientific classification
- Kingdom: Animalia
- Phylum: Arthropoda
- Subphylum: Chelicerata
- Class: Arachnida
- Order: Araneae
- Infraorder: Araneomorphae
- Family: Hersiliidae
- Genus: Tyrotama
- Species: T. taris

Binomial name
- Tyrotama taris Foord & Dippenaar-Schoeman, 2005

Species of spider

Tyrotama taris is a species of spider in the family Hersiliidae. It is endemic to the Northern Cape province of South Africa.

== Distribution ==
Tyrotama taris is known only from the type locality in Richtersveld Transfrontier National Park at an altitude of 346 m above sea level.

== Habitat ==
The species occurs in Desert biomes and is found under stones where it builds irregular webs.

== Description ==
Tyrotama taris is known only from females. Like other members of the genus Tyrotama, it exhibits the characteristic shorter legs compared to Hersilia.

== Ecology ==
This species is found under stones where it constructs irregular webs, following the typical lifestyle pattern of the genus Tyrotama.

== Conservation ==
Tyrotama taris is listed as Data Deficient for taxonomic reasons. The placement of the male is problematic, and insufficient information is available about the species' location, habitat, and potential threats to make a proper conservation assessment. The species is protected within Richtersveld Transfrontier National Park. More sampling is needed to collect males and determine the species' full range.

== Taxonomy ==
The species was described in 2005 by Foord & Dippenaar-Schoeman from the Richtersveld Transfrontier National Park in the Northern Cape.
