= Prima ansieae =

Scientific classification
- Kingdom: Animalia
- Phylum: Arthropoda
- Subphylum: Chelicerata
- Class: Arachnida
- Order: Araneae
- Infraorder: Araneomorphae
- Family: Hersiliidae
- Genus: Prima; Foord, 2008
- Species: P. ansieae

Binomial name
- Prima ansieae Foord, 2008

Genus of spiders

Prima is a monotypic genus of East African tree trunk spiders containing the single species, Prima ansieae. It was first described by S. H. Foord in 2008, and has only been found on Madagascar.
