= Promurricia =

Scientific classification
- Domain: Eukaryota
- Kingdom: Animalia
- Phylum: Arthropoda
- Subphylum: Chelicerata
- Class: Arachnida
- Order: Araneae
- Infraorder: Araneomorphae
- Family: Hersiliidae
- Genus: Promurricia; Baehr & Baehr, 1993
- Species: P. depressa

Binomial name
- Promurricia depressa Baehr & Baehr, 1993

Genus of spiders

Promurricia is a monotypic genus of Asian tree trunk spiders containing the single species, Promurricia depressa. It was first described by M. Baehr & B. Baehr in 1993, and has only been found in Sri Lanka.
