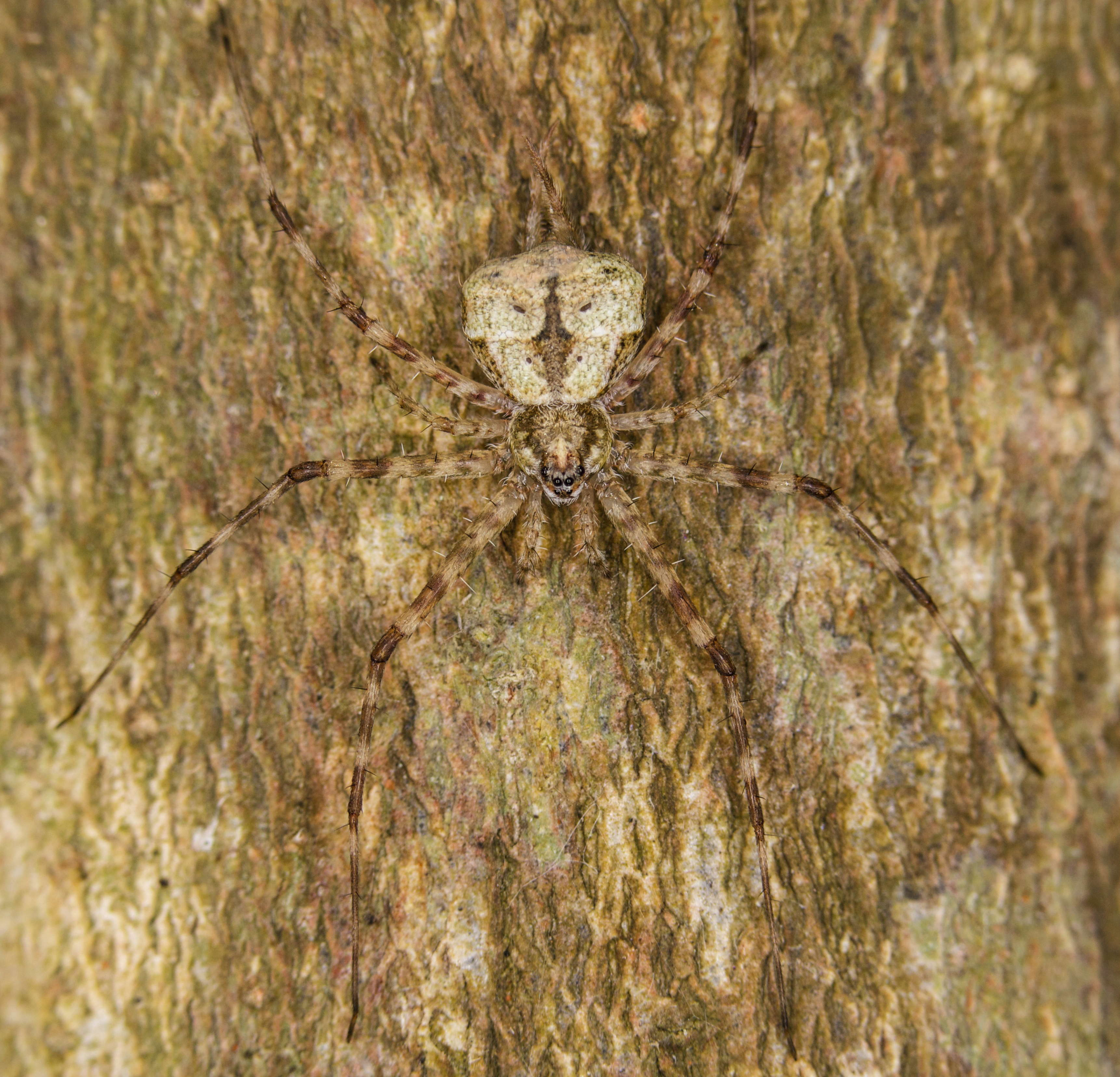

Scientific classification
- Domain: Eukaryota
- Kingdom: Animalia
- Phylum: Arthropoda
- Subphylum: Chelicerata
- Class: Arachnida
- Order: Araneae
- Infraorder: Araneomorphae
- Family: Hersiliidae
- Genus: Tamopsis
- Species: T. brisbanensis

Binomial name
- Tamopsis brisbanensis Baehr & Baehr, 1987

= Tamopsis brisbanensis =

Species of spider

Tamopsis brisbanensis is a species of spider in the family Hersiliidae, found in Australia (Queensland, New South Wales). It is sometimes called the Brisbane two-tailed spider. It is one of a large number of new Tamopsis species described by Barbara Baehr and Martin Baehr between 1987 and 1998.
