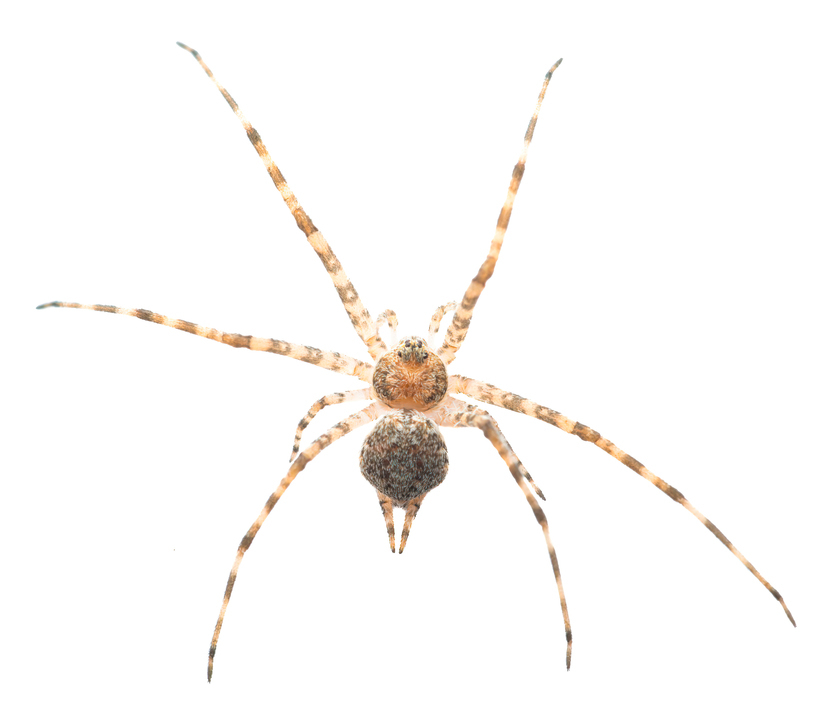
- dorsal view
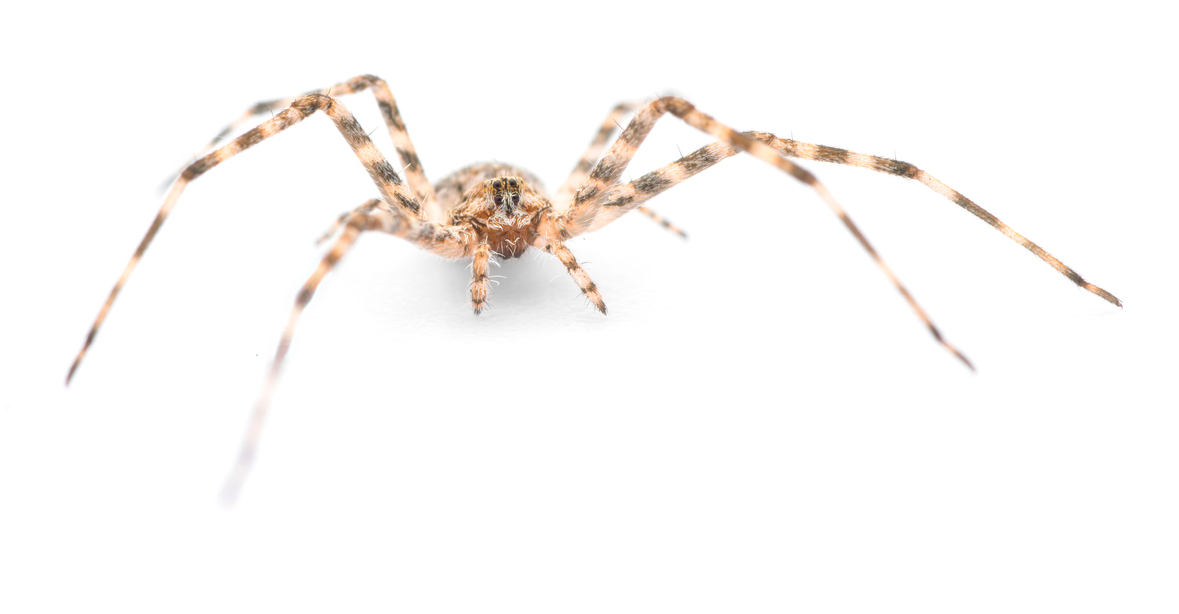
- frontal view

Scientific classification
- Kingdom: Animalia
- Phylum: Arthropoda
- Subphylum: Chelicerata
- Class: Arachnida
- Order: Araneae
- Infraorder: Araneomorphae
- Family: Hersiliidae
- Genus: Tama; Simon, 1882
- Species: T. edwardsi

Binomial name
- Tama edwardsi (Lucas, 1846)

= Tama edwardsi =

Genus of spiders

Tama is a monotypic genus of tree trunk spiders containing the single species, Tama edwardsi. It was first described by Eugène Simon in 1882, and has only been found in Spain, in Portugal, and in Algeria.
