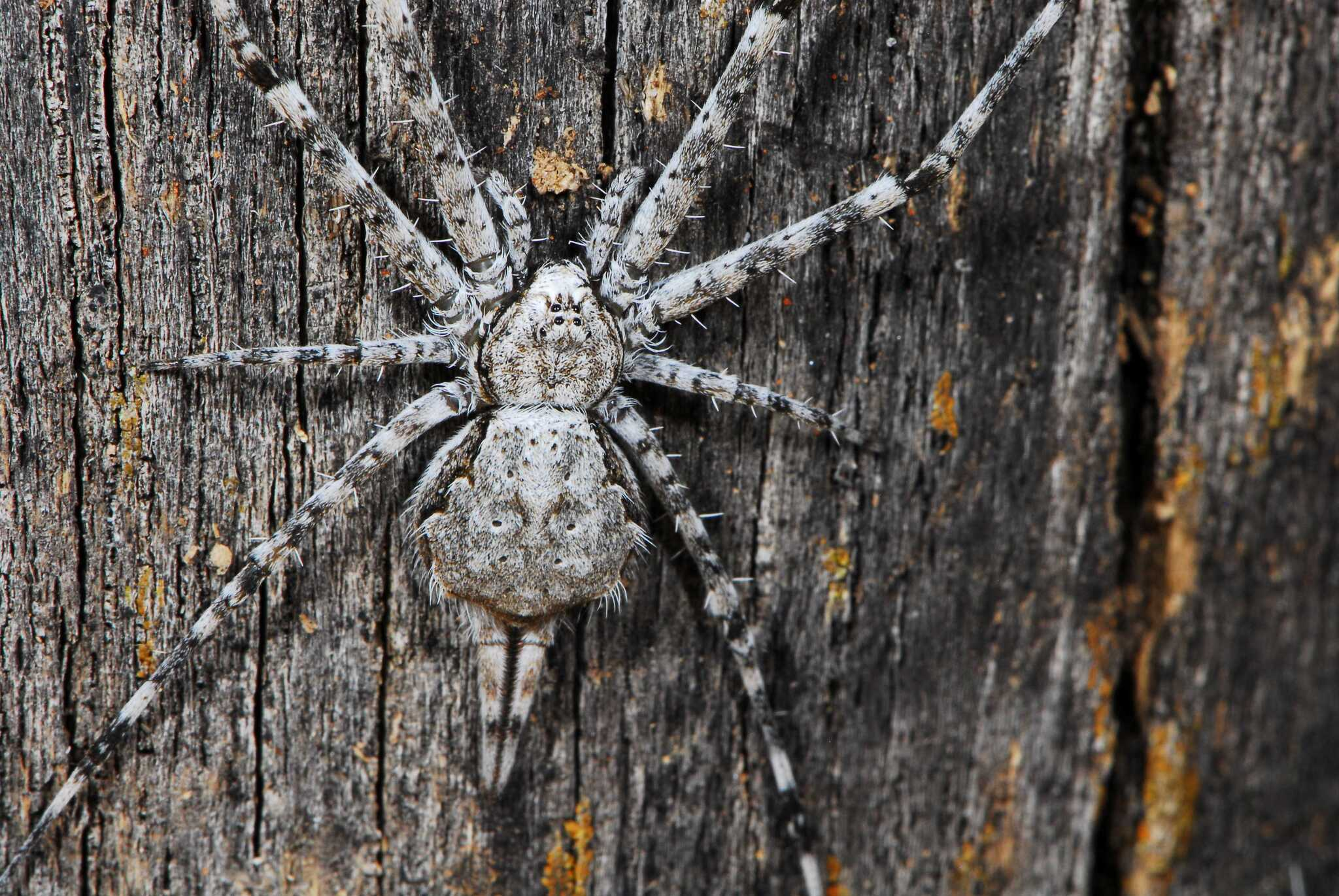
- Female
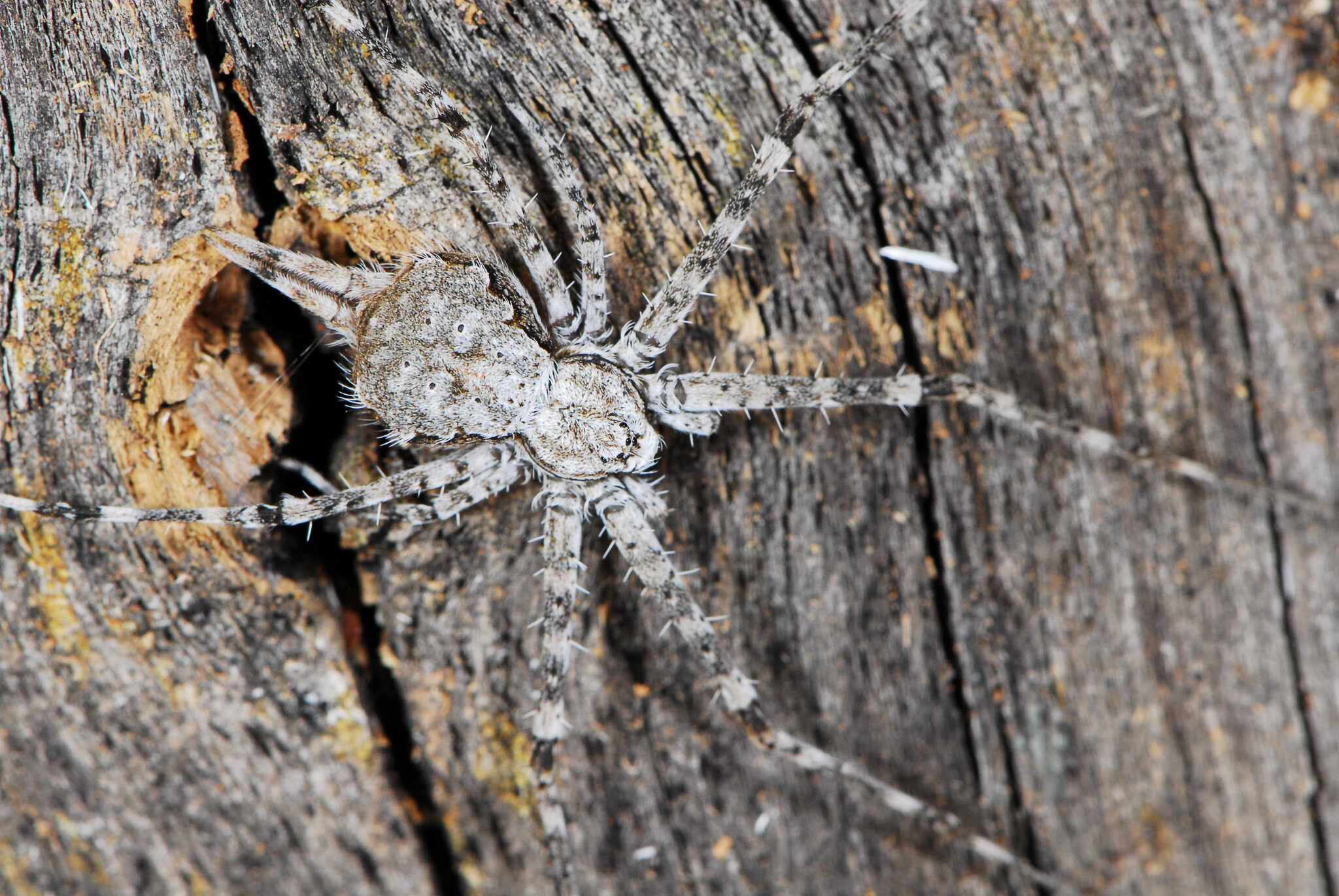
- Female

Scientific classification
- Kingdom: Animalia
- Phylum: Arthropoda
- Subphylum: Chelicerata
- Class: Arachnida
- Order: Araneae
- Infraorder: Araneomorphae
- Family: Hersiliidae
- Genus: Hersilia
- Species: H. setifrons

Binomial name
- Hersilia setifrons Lawrence, 1928

= Hersilia setifrons =

Namibian Long Spinnered Tree Spider

Species of spider

Hersilia setifrons is a species of spider in the family Hersiliidae. It is a southern African endemic and is commonly known as the Namibian Long Spinnered Tree Spider.

== Distribution ==
Hersilia setifrons occurs in Angola, Namibia, Zimbabwe, and South Africa. In South Africa, the species is widely distributed across six of the nine provinces at altitudes ranging from 47 to 1,556 m above sea level.

== Habitat ==
The species occurs in Forest, Grassland, Nama Karoo, and Savanna biomes. It is found in the more western regions of its range and becomes sympatric with H. sericea towards the wetter eastern parts.

== Description ==
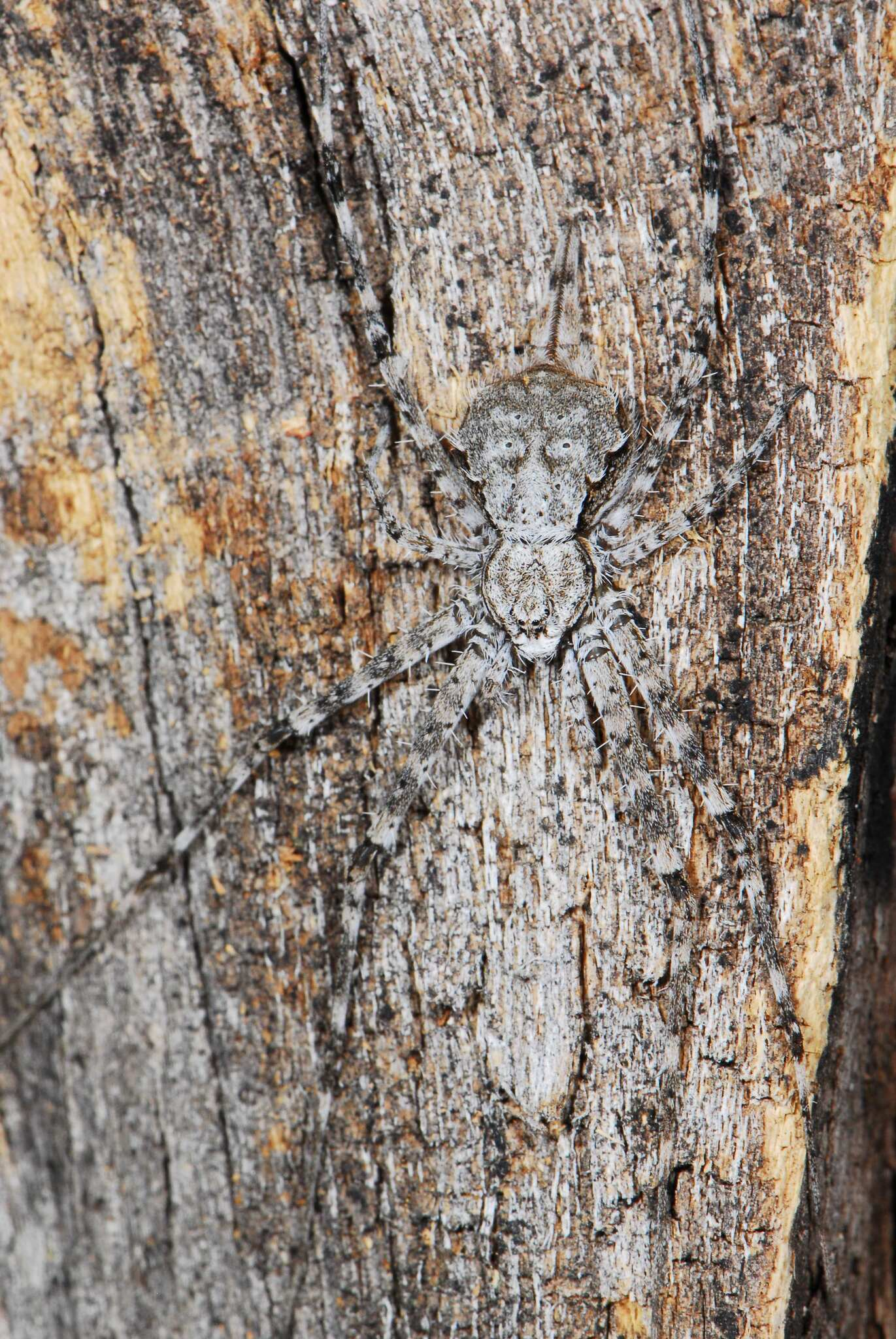
female

Hersilia setifrons is known from both sexes and exhibits the typical flattened body form of the genus Hersilia. Like other members of the family Hersiliidae, it possesses extremely long posterior spinnerets adapted for its bark-dwelling lifestyle.

== Conservation ==
Hersilia setifrons is listed as Least Concern by the South African National Biodiversity Institute due to its wide distribution range. The species is protected in nine protected areas including Tswalu Game Reserve, Blouberg Nature Reserve, and Nylsvley Nature Reserve. No significant threats have been identified.

== Taxonomy ==
The species was originally described by R. F. Lawrence in 1928 from Namibia. It was subsequently revised by Foord & Dippenaar-Schoeman in 2006 as part of their comprehensive revision of Afrotropical Hersilia species.
