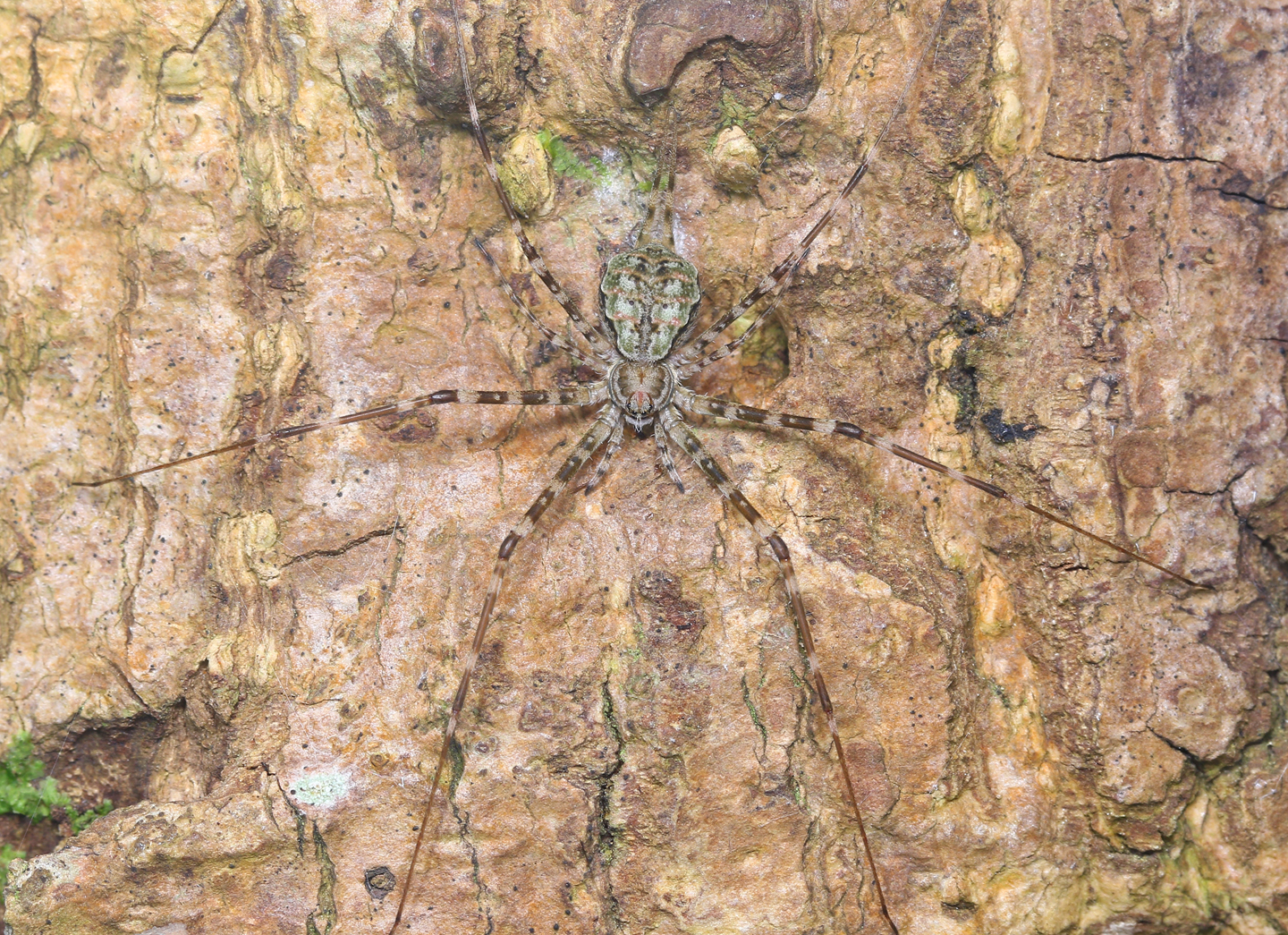
- female from China

Scientific classification
- Kingdom: Animalia
- Phylum: Arthropoda
- Subphylum: Chelicerata
- Class: Arachnida
- Order: Araneae
- Infraorder: Araneomorphae
- Family: Hersiliidae
- Genus: Hersilia
- Species: H. striata

Binomial name
- Hersilia striata Wang & Yin, 1985

= Hersilia striata =

Species of spider

Hersilia striata is a species of spider in the family Hersiliidae. It was first described by Wang & Yin in 1985 from specimens collected in China.

== Distribution ==
H. striata has a wide distribution across tropical and subtropical Asia. It has been recorded from India, China, Taiwan, Myanmar, Thailand, and Indonesia (including Java and Sumatra). The species appears to be well-established throughout this range, with multiple taxonomic studies confirming its presence across these regions.

== Description ==
Hersilia striata is a relatively small spider with distinctive morphological features typical of the family Hersiliidae. The species exhibits sexual dimorphism, with males being smaller than females.

The species is characterized by its striped coloration pattern, which gives it its specific name "striata". The cephalothorax displays a yellowish-brown base color with distinct markings, while the abdomen shows a pattern of light and dark bands. The legs are relatively long and bear characteristic color patterns that aid in species identification.

The female exhibits a more robust build compared to the male. The male pedipalps have a characteristic structure with a short embolus and specific tibial apophyses that distinguish this species from related taxa.

== Ecology and behavior ==
Like other members of the genus Hersilia, H. striata is known for its cryptic behavior and preference for tree bark habitats. The species constructs small webs and is often found in association with tree crevices where it can blend with the bark coloration. This camouflage behavior makes the species difficult to observe in its natural habitat.

== Taxonomy ==
Hersilia striata belongs to the family Hersiliidae, commonly known as long-spinneret spiders due to their characteristically elongated posterior spinnerets. The species was originally described based on both male and female specimens, providing a comprehensive understanding of its morphological variation.

The species has been the subject of several taxonomic revisions and has been included in various regional spider fauna studies, confirming its widespread distribution and taxonomic stability.
