= Hersilia sagitta =

Kenya Long Spinnered Tree Spider

Conservation status
- Least Concern (SANBI Red List)

Scientific classification
- Kingdom: Animalia
- Phylum: Arthropoda
- Subphylum: Chelicerata
- Class: Arachnida
- Order: Araneae
- Infraorder: Araneomorphae
- Family: Hersiliidae
- Genus: Hersilia
- Species: H. sagitta

Binomial name
- Hersilia sagitta Foord & Dippenaar-Schoeman, 2006

Species of spider

Hersilia sagitta is a species of spider in the family Hersiliidae. It is an African endemic and is commonly known as the Kenya Long Spinnered Tree Spider.

== Etymology ==
The specific name sagitta is Latin for "arrow, shaft, bolt".

== Distribution ==
Hersilia sagitta occurs in four African countries: Kenya, Tanzania, Malawi, and South Africa. In South Africa, the species is recorded from two provinces at altitudes ranging from 93 to 1,148 m above sea level.

== Habitat ==
The species inhabits forest areas and is found in Savanna biomes in South Africa. It is a free-living bark dweller that remains cryptic by pressing its body against tree bark substrates.

== Description ==
Hersilia sagitta is known from both sexes and exhibits the typical characteristics of the genus Hersilia. Like other members of the family Hersiliidae, it possesses extremely long posterior spinnerets and a flattened body form adapted for living on tree bark surfaces.

== Ecology ==
This species displays cryptic behaviour, remaining motionless with its body pressed against substrates when at rest. When disturbed, it moves at great speed. The species is typically found in forested environments.

== Conservation ==
Hersilia sagitta is listed as Least Concern by the South African National Biodiversity Institute due to its wide distribution range across multiple African countries. The species is protected in Tembe Elephant Park and Kruger National Park. No significant threats have been identified.

== Taxonomy ==
The species was described in 2006 by Foord & Dippenaar-Schoeman from Kenya as part of their comprehensive revision of Afrotropical Hersilia species.
