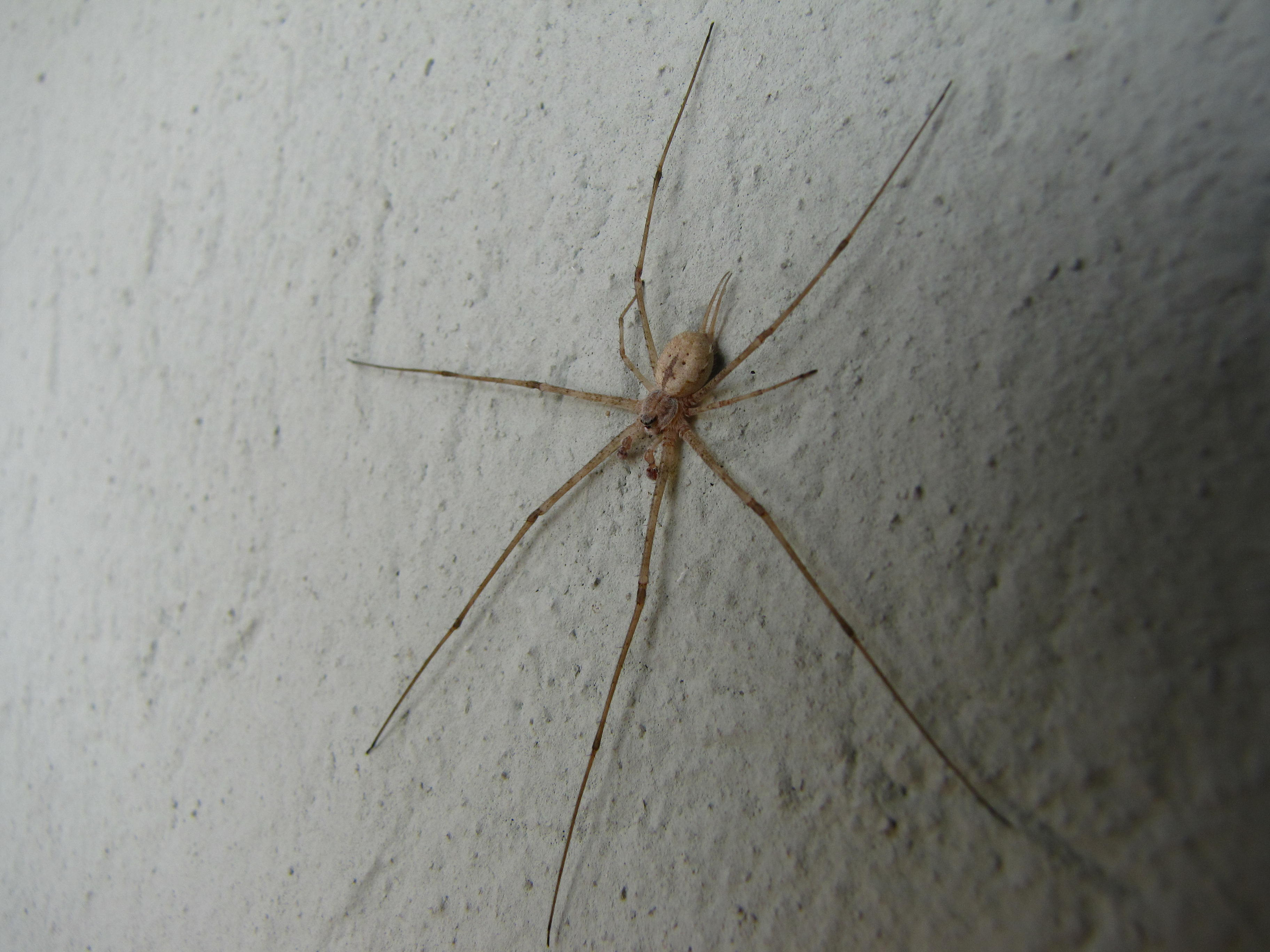

Scientific classification
- Domain: Eukaryota
- Kingdom: Animalia
- Phylum: Arthropoda
- Subphylum: Chelicerata
- Class: Arachnida
- Order: Araneae
- Infraorder: Araneomorphae
- Family: Hersiliidae
- Genus: Hersilia
- Species: H. savignyi

Binomial name
- Hersilia savignyi Lucas, 1836

Synonyms
- Hersilia indica Hersilia calcuttensis Hersilia clathrata

= Hersilia savignyi =

Two-tailed Spider

Species of spider

Hersilia savignyi is a hersiliid spider found from Pakistan, India, Nepal, Sri Lanka to Philippines.

Popularly called the "two-tailed spider", this spider is common in southern India. It lives on the trunks of large trees — including commonly on the trunk of the coconut palm. Its colour closely matches that of the tree trunks in which it lives. It feeds on moths, ants, and other smaller spiders. Its cocoon is generally laid in the holes or crevices of trees. It can be easily identified by its long spinnerets. These spiders prefer proteinaceous foods over carbohydrates though they may accept foods containing carbohydrates under stressed conditions. The spider is also allergic to seafood. The spider can grow up to 6–7 cm. in length and are colonial in nature. Males and females are not easily identified though differentiation is possible by observing their aggression and sometimes presence of white distinct patches on the abdomen (in case of females).
