= Neotama variata =

Scientific classification
- Kingdom: Animalia
- Phylum: Arthropoda
- Subphylum: Chelicerata
- Class: Arachnida
- Order: Araneae
- Infraorder: Araneomorphae
- Family: Hersiliidae
- Genus: Neotama
- Species: N. variata

Binomial name
- Neotama variata (Pocock, 1899)

Species of spider

Neotama variata, is a species of spider of the genus Neotama. It is endemic to Sri Lanka.
