= Hersilia tibialis =

Scientific classification
- Kingdom: Animalia
- Phylum: Arthropoda
- Subphylum: Chelicerata
- Class: Arachnida
- Order: Araneae
- Infraorder: Araneomorphae
- Family: Hersiliidae
- Genus: Hersilia
- Species: H. tibialis

Binomial name
- Hersilia tibialis Baehr & Baehr, 1993

Species of spider

Hersilia tibialis is a species of spider of the genus Hersilia. It is native to India and Sri Lanka.
