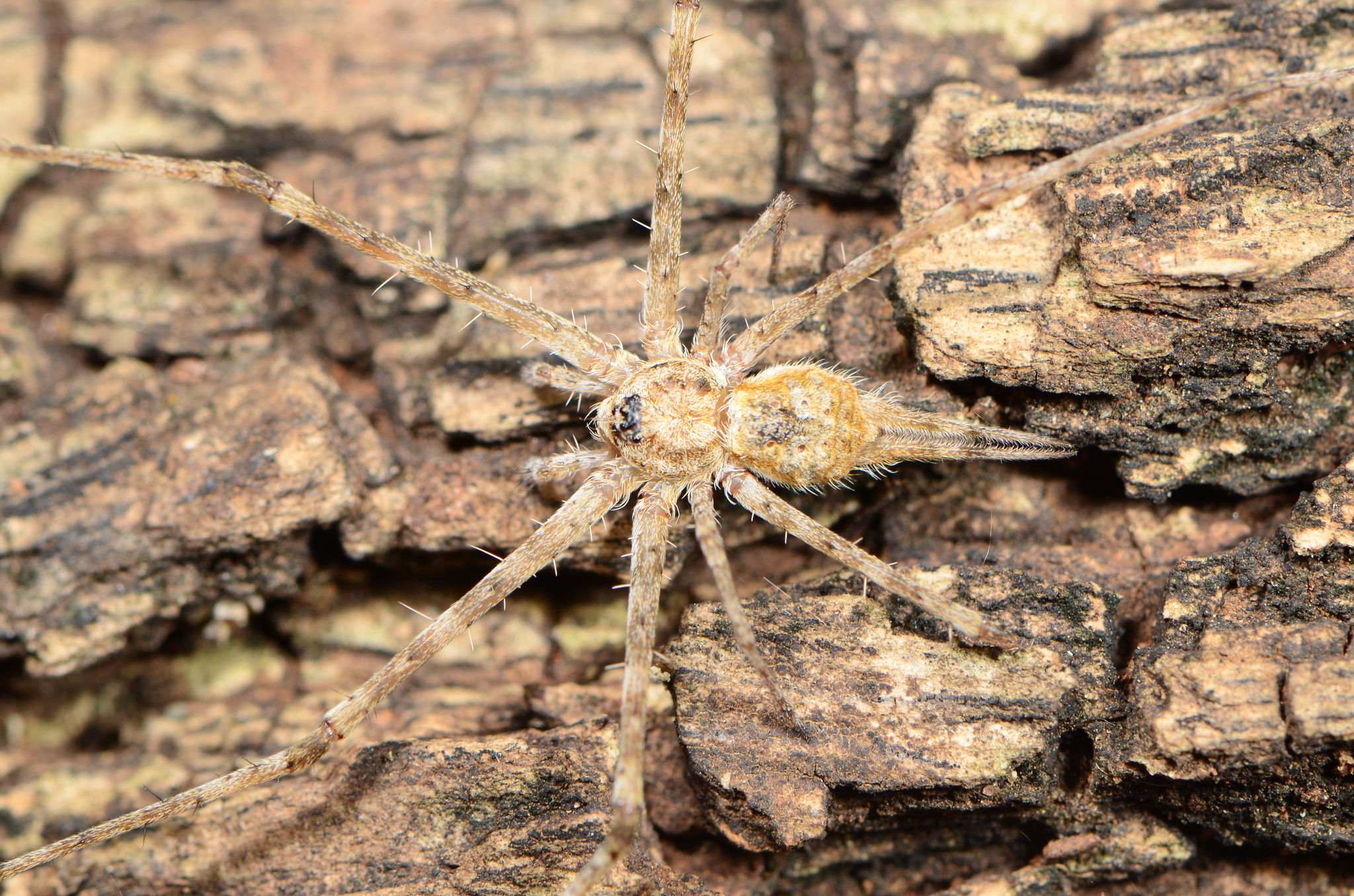
- Adult female
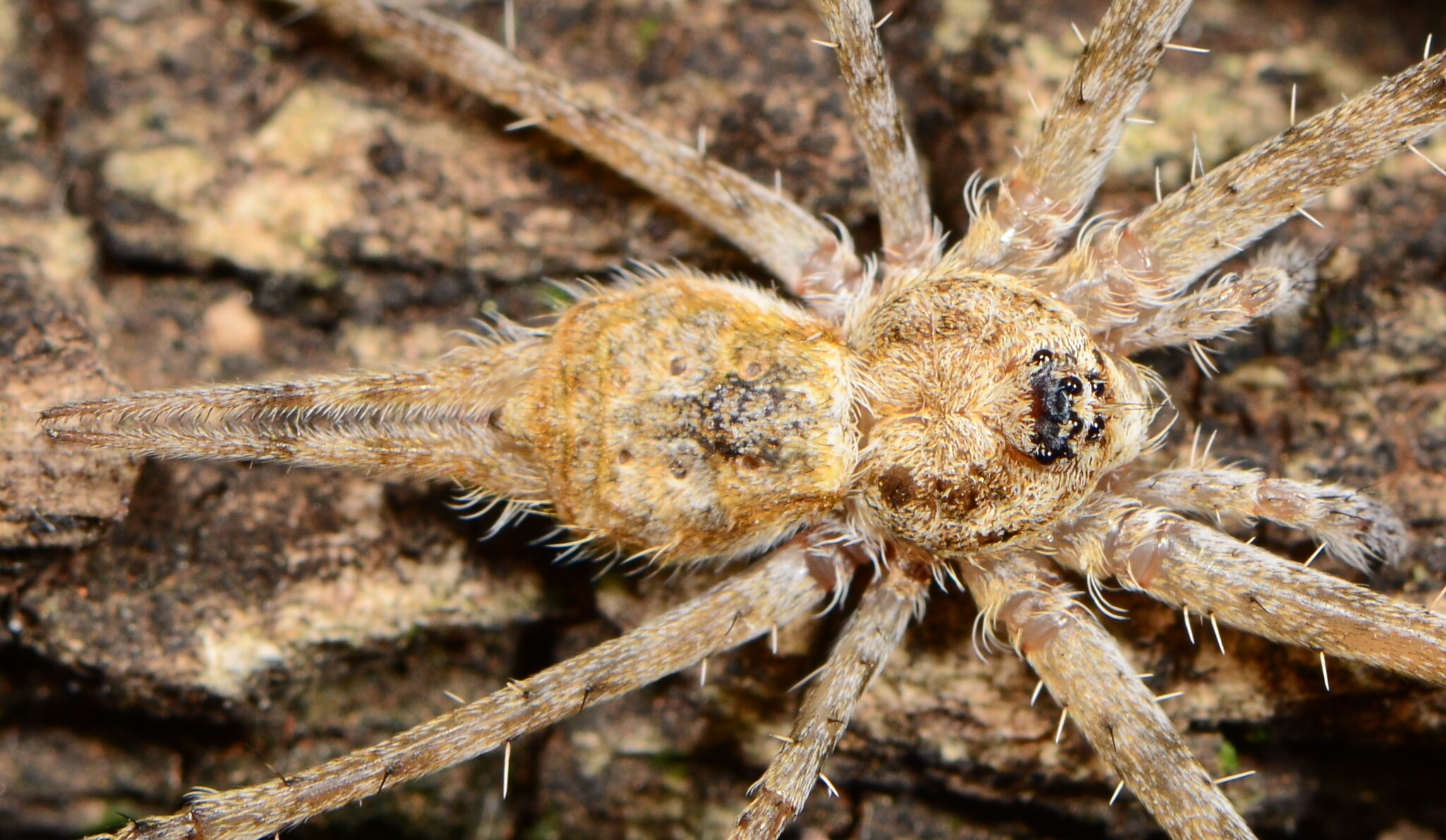

Scientific classification
- Kingdom: Animalia
- Phylum: Arthropoda
- Subphylum: Chelicerata
- Class: Arachnida
- Order: Araneae
- Infraorder: Araneomorphae
- Family: Hersiliidae
- Genus: Hersilia
- Species: H. arborea

Binomial name
- Hersilia arborea Lawrence, 1928

= Hersilia arborea =

Long-spinneret Tree Spider

Species of spider

Hersilia arborea is a species of spider in the family Hersiliidae. It is endemic to southern Africa and is commonly known as the Long-spinneret tree spider.

== Etymology ==
The specific name arborea is derived from the Latin word for "tree", referring to the species' arboreal lifestyle on tree bark.

== Distribution ==
Hersilia arborea occurs in Namibia, Zimbabwe, and South Africa. In South Africa, the species is recorded from four provinces at altitudes ranging from 271 to 1,535 m above sea level.

== Habitat ==
The species inhabits Grassland and Savanna biomes. It is a free-living bark dweller found on various tree species, though it does not appear to prefer specific tree types. Tree trunk size may influence habitat selection.

== Description ==
Hersilia arborea is known from both sexes. The species exhibits the characteristic flattened body form of the genus Hersilia, which allows it to press closely against tree bark for camouflage. Like other members of the family Hersiliidae, it possesses extremely long posterior spinnerets that are as long as the opisthosoma.

== Ecology ==
This species is cryptic in behaviour, remaining motionless with its body pressed against the substrate when at rest. When disturbed, it moves at great speed. Females construct flat, oval-shaped egg sacs on tree trunk surfaces, which are camouflaged with bits of bark. The female guards these eggs in an upside-down position until the young emerge.

== Conservation ==
Hersilia arborea is listed as Least Concern by the South African National Biodiversity Institute due to its wide distribution range. The species is protected in several areas including Blouberg Nature Reserve, Lekgalameetse Nature Reserve, and Marakele National Park. No significant threats have been identified, and no conservation actions are currently recommended.

== Taxonomy ==
The species was originally described by R. F. Lawrence in 1928 from Namibia. It was subsequently revised by Foord & Dippenaar-Schoeman in 2006 as part of their comprehensive revision of Afrotropical Hersilia species.
