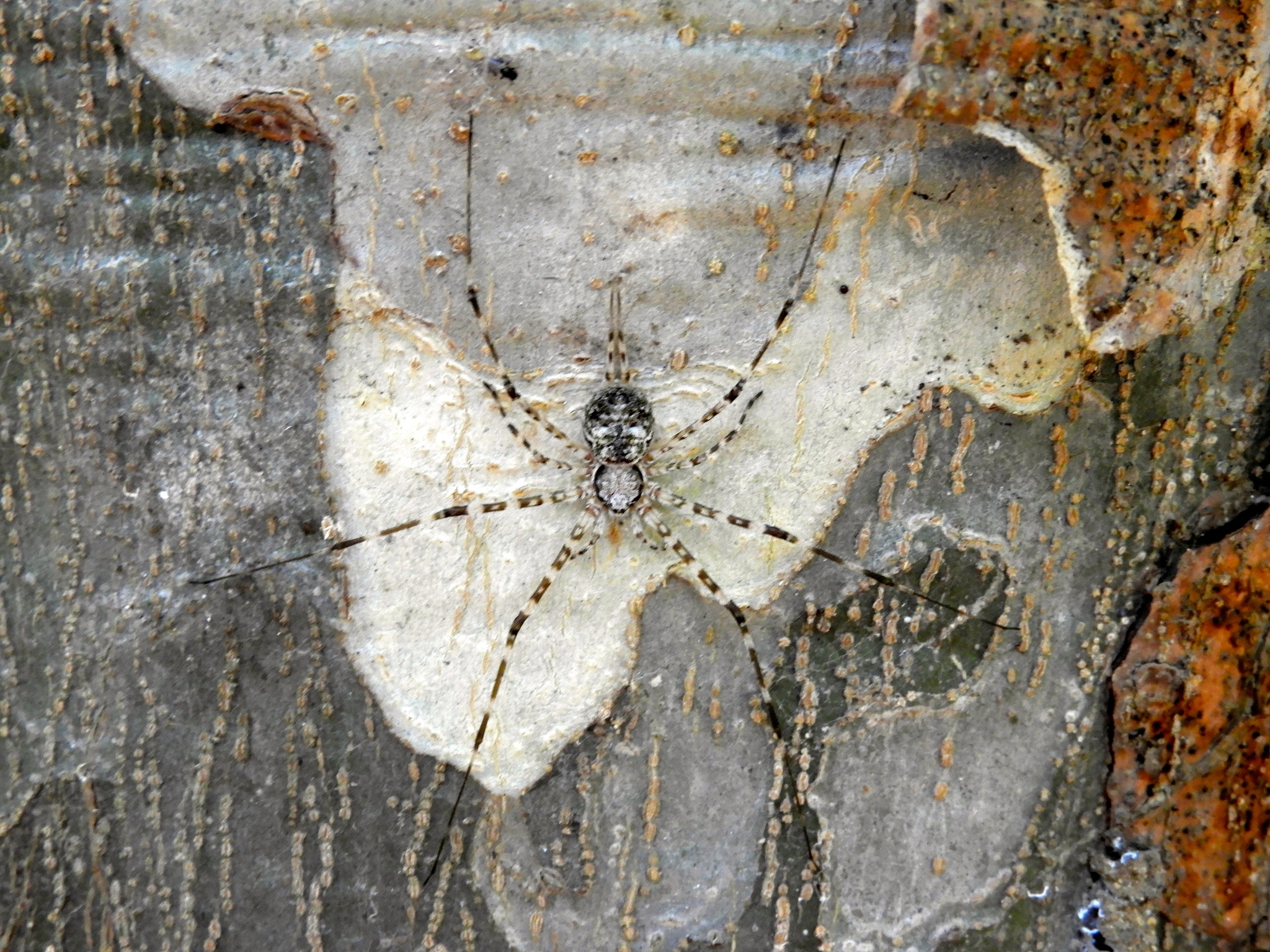

Scientific classification
- Domain: Eukaryota
- Kingdom: Animalia
- Phylum: Arthropoda
- Subphylum: Chelicerata
- Class: Arachnida
- Order: Araneae
- Infraorder: Araneomorphae
- Family: Hersiliidae
- Genus: Neotama
- Species: N. mexicana

Binomial name
- Neotama mexicana (O. P.-Cambridge, 1893)

= Neotama mexicana =

Species of spider

Neotama mexicana, also known as the long-spinneret spider or Mexican two-tailed spider, is a species of tree trunk spider in the family Hersiliidae. It is found in a range from the United States to Peru and Guyana.
