= Neotama corticola =

Durban Long Spinneret Tree Spider

Conservation status
- Least Concern (SANBI Red List)

- Least Concern (IUCN 3.1)

Scientific classification
- Kingdom: Animalia
- Phylum: Arthropoda
- Subphylum: Chelicerata
- Class: Arachnida
- Order: Araneae
- Infraorder: Araneomorphae
- Family: Hersiliidae
- Genus: Neotama
- Species: N. corticola

Binomial name
- Neotama corticola (Lawrence, 1937)

Synonyms
- Hersilia corticola Lawrence, 1937

Species of spider

Neotama corticola is a species of spider in the family Hersiliidae. It is endemic to South Africa and is commonly known as the Durban Long Spinneret Tree Spider.

== Distribution ==
Neotama corticola is found in three South African provinces at altitudes ranging from 45 to 1,307 m above sea level.

== Habitat ==
The species is an arboreal species found mainly on tree trunks in forest areas. It occurs in Forest, Indian Ocean Coastal Belt and Savanna biomes.

== Description ==
Neotama corticola is known from both sexes. The species exhibits the characteristic long posterior spinnerets of the family Hersiliidae.

== Conservation ==
Neotama corticola is listed as Least Concern by the South African National Biodiversity Institute due to its wide distribution range. The species is protected in six protected areas and faces no significant threats.

== Taxonomy ==
The species was originally described by R. F. Lawrence in 1937 as Hersilia corticola from Durban in KwaZulu-Natal. Foord & Dippenaar-Schoeman (2005) transferred it to the genus Neotama.
