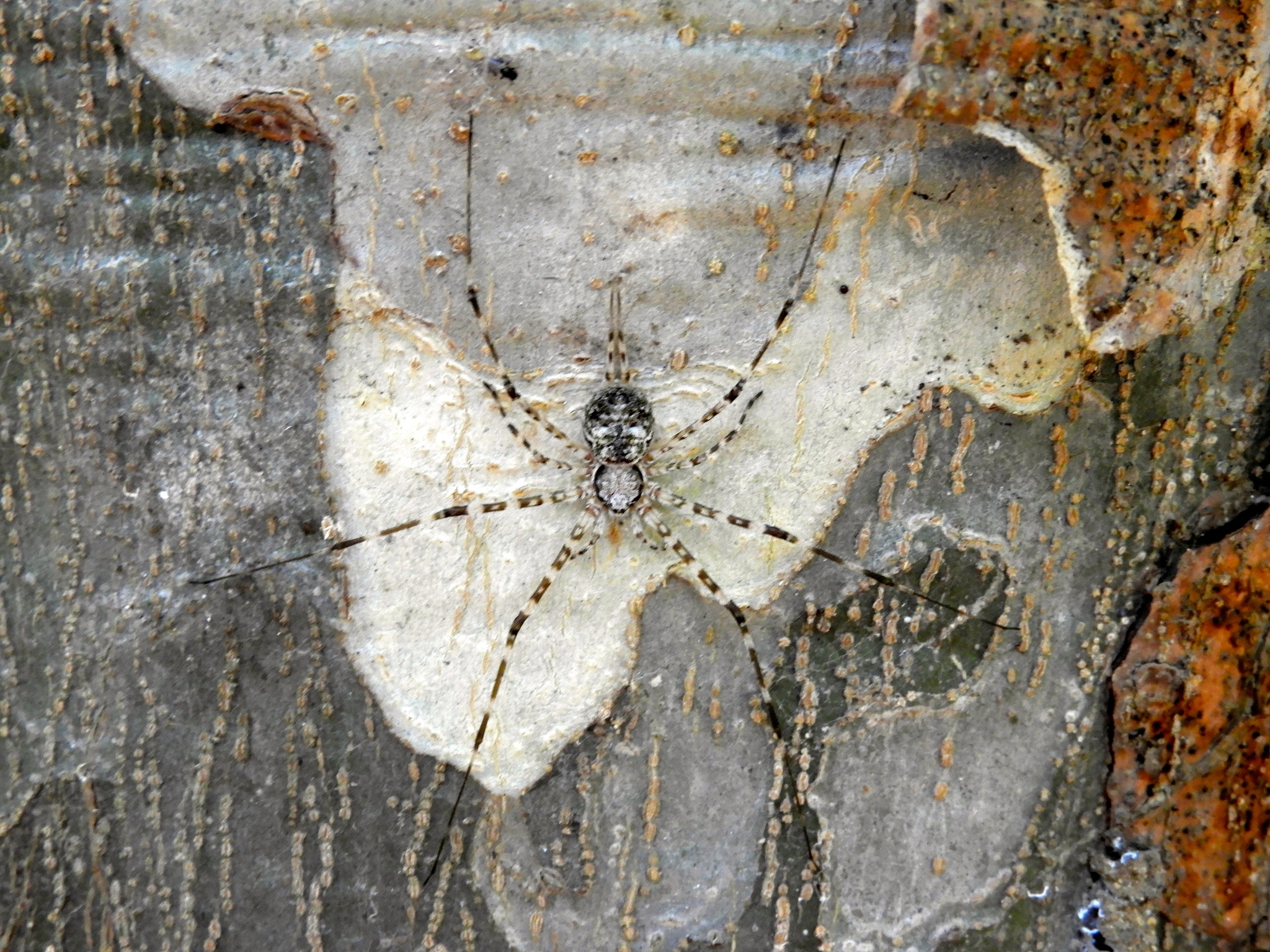
- Neotama mexicana

Scientific classification
- Kingdom: Animalia
- Phylum: Arthropoda
- Subphylum: Chelicerata
- Class: Arachnida
- Order: Araneae
- Infraorder: Araneomorphae
- Family: Hersiliidae
- Genus: Neotama; Baehr & Baehr, 1993

Type species
- N. variata (Pocock, 1899)

Species
- 9, see text

= Neotama =

Genus of spiders

Neotama is a genus of tree trunk spiders that was first described by M. Baehr & B. Baehr in 1993.

== Species ==
As of September 2025 it contains nine species:

- Neotama corticola (Lawrence, 1937) – South Africa
- Neotama cunhabebe Rheims & Brescovit, 2004 – Peru, Brazil
- Neotama forcipata (F. O. Pickard-Cambridge, 1902) – Mexico to El Salvador
- Neotama longimana Baehr & Baehr, 1993 – Indonesia (Java, Sumatra)
- Neotama mexicana (O. Pickard-Cambridge, 1893) – United States to Peru, Guyana
- Neotama obatala Rheims & Brescovit, 2004 – Ecuador, Peru, Brazil, Guyana
- Neotama punctigera Baehr & Baehr, 1993 – India
- Neotama rothorum Baehr & Baehr, 1993 – India
- Neotama variata (Pocock, 1899) (type) – Sri Lanka
