= Duninia =

Scientific classification
- Kingdom: Animalia
- Phylum: Arthropoda
- Subphylum: Chelicerata
- Class: Arachnida
- Order: Araneae
- Infraorder: Araneomorphae
- Family: Hersiliidae
- Genus: Duninia; Marusik & Fet, 2009

Type species
- D. baehrae Marusik & Fet, 2009

Species
- 4, see text

Genus of spiders

Duninia is a genus of Asian tree trunk spiders that was first described by Yuri M. Marusik & Victor R. Fet in 2009.

== Species ==
As of May 2019 it contains four species:

- Duninia baehrae Marusik & Fet, 2009 (type) – Turkmenistan, Iran
- Duninia darvishi Mirshamsi & Marusik, 2013 – Iran
- Duninia grodnitskyi Zamani & Marusik, 2018 – Iran
- Duninia rheimsae Marusik & Fet, 2009 – Iran
