= Bastanius =

Scientific classification
- Kingdom: Animalia
- Phylum: Arthropoda
- Subphylum: Chelicerata
- Class: Arachnida
- Order: Araneae
- Infraorder: Araneomorphae
- Family: Hersiliidae
- Genus: Bastanius; Mirshamsi, Zamani & Marusik

Type species
- Bastanius kermanensis

Species
- Bastanius foordi (Marusik & Fet, 2009); Bastanius kermanensis Mirshamsi, Zamani & Marusik, 2016

Genus of spiders

Bastanius is a genus of spiders in the family Hersiliidae. It was first described in 2016 by Mirshamsi, Zamani & Marusik. As of 2017, it contains 2 species, both found in Iran.
