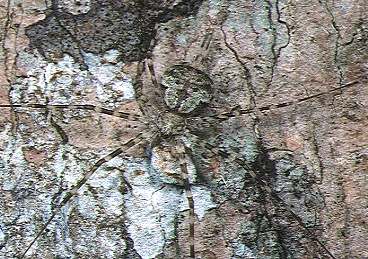
- A female H. yaeyamaensis from Okinawa
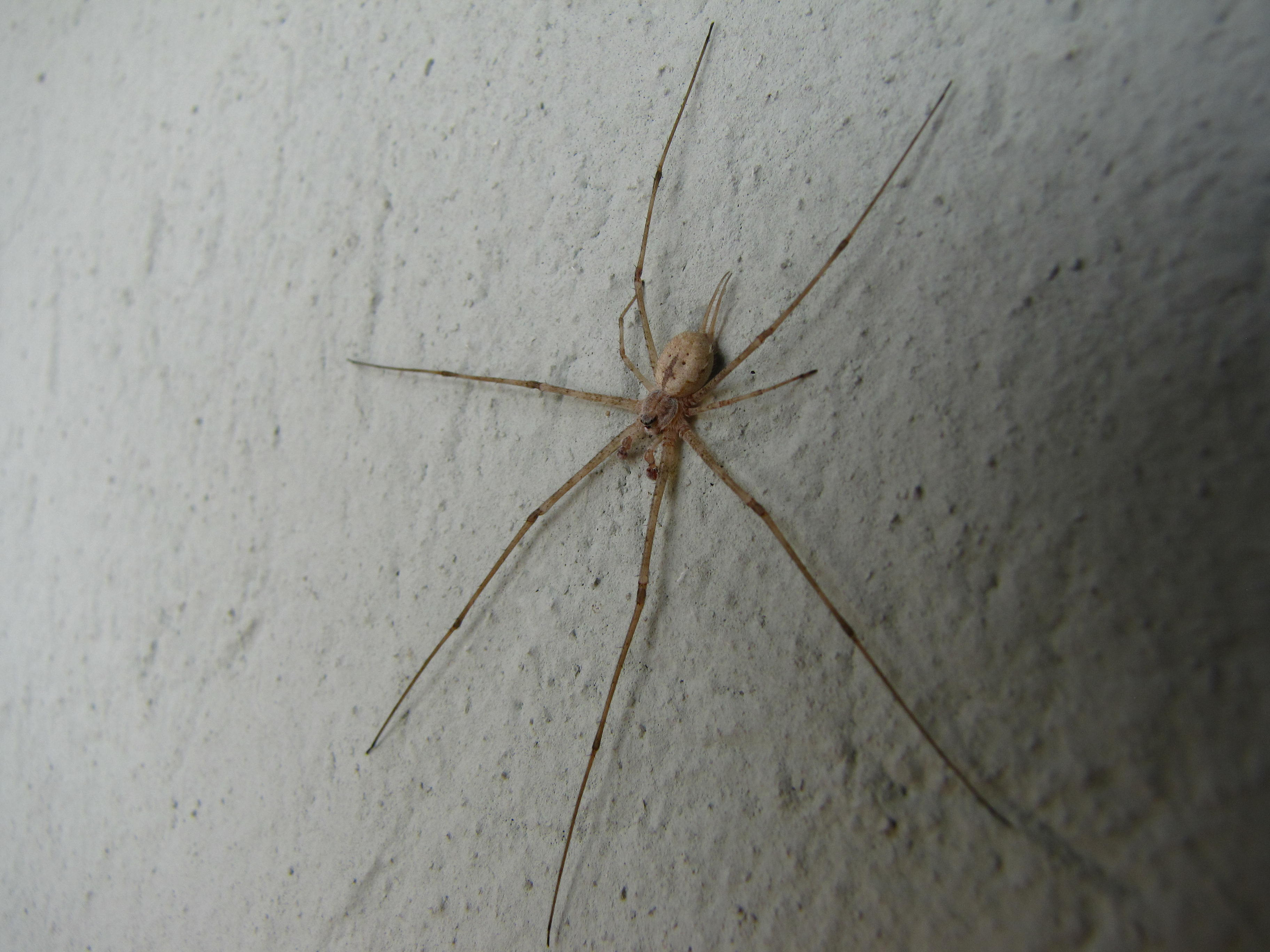
- H. savignyi in Ezhimala, Payyannur, Kerala, India, 2012-05-13

Scientific classification
- Kingdom: Animalia
- Phylum: Arthropoda
- Subphylum: Chelicerata
- Class: Arachnida
- Order: Araneae
- Infraorder: Araneomorphae
- Family: Hersiliidae
- Genus: Hersilia; Audouin, 1826

Type species
- H. caudata Audouin, 1826

Species
- 78, see text

= Hersilia (spider) =

Hersilia Temporal range: Palaeogene–present

Genus of spiders

Hersilia, also known as long-spinnereted bark spiders and two-tailed spiders, is a genus of tree trunk spiders that was first described by Jean Victoire Audouin in 1826. Their nicknames are a reference to their greatly enlarged spinnerets.

Males can grow up to 8 millimetres (0.31 in) long, and females can grow up to 10 millimetres (0.39 in). They are found in Africa, Asia, and Australasia, on tree trunks, in gardens, or in jungle fringes.

== Species ==
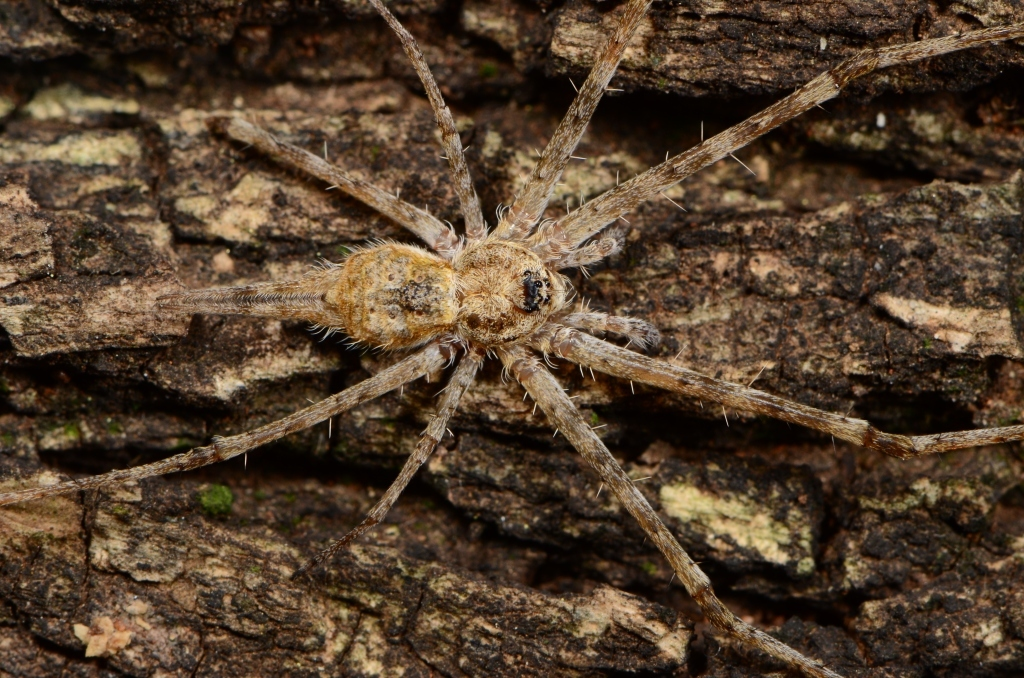
H. arborea from South Africa

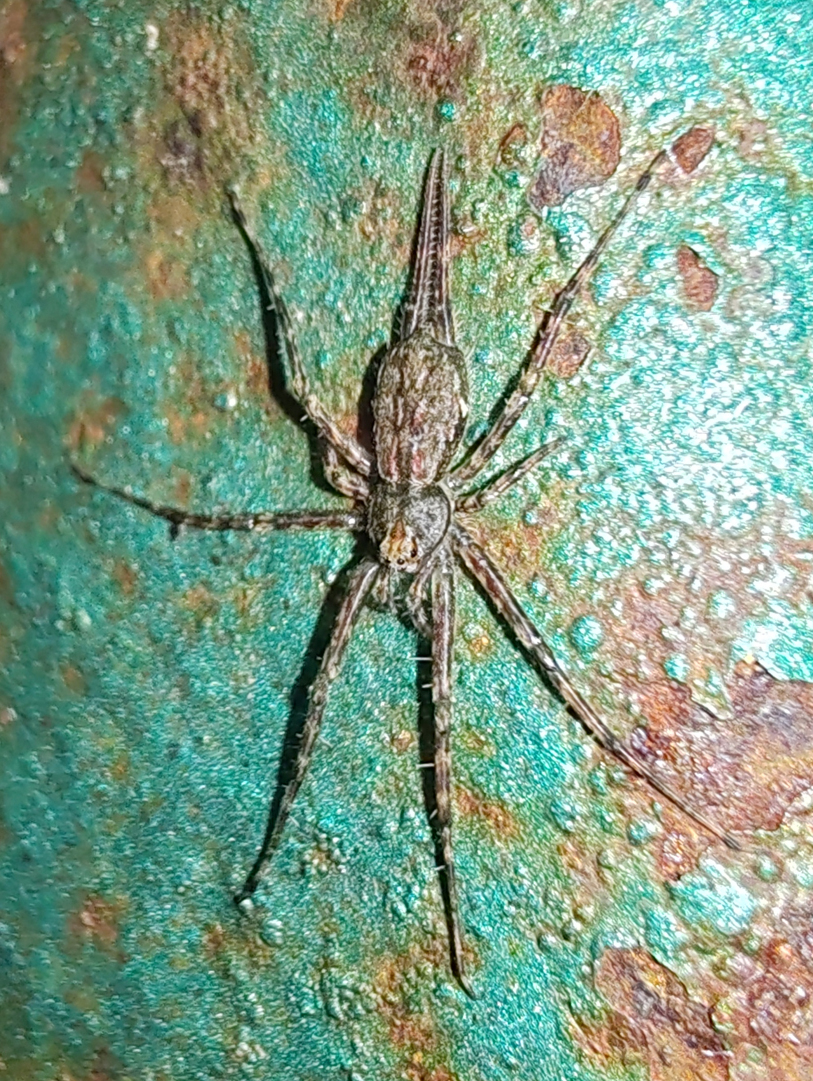
H. lelabah from China

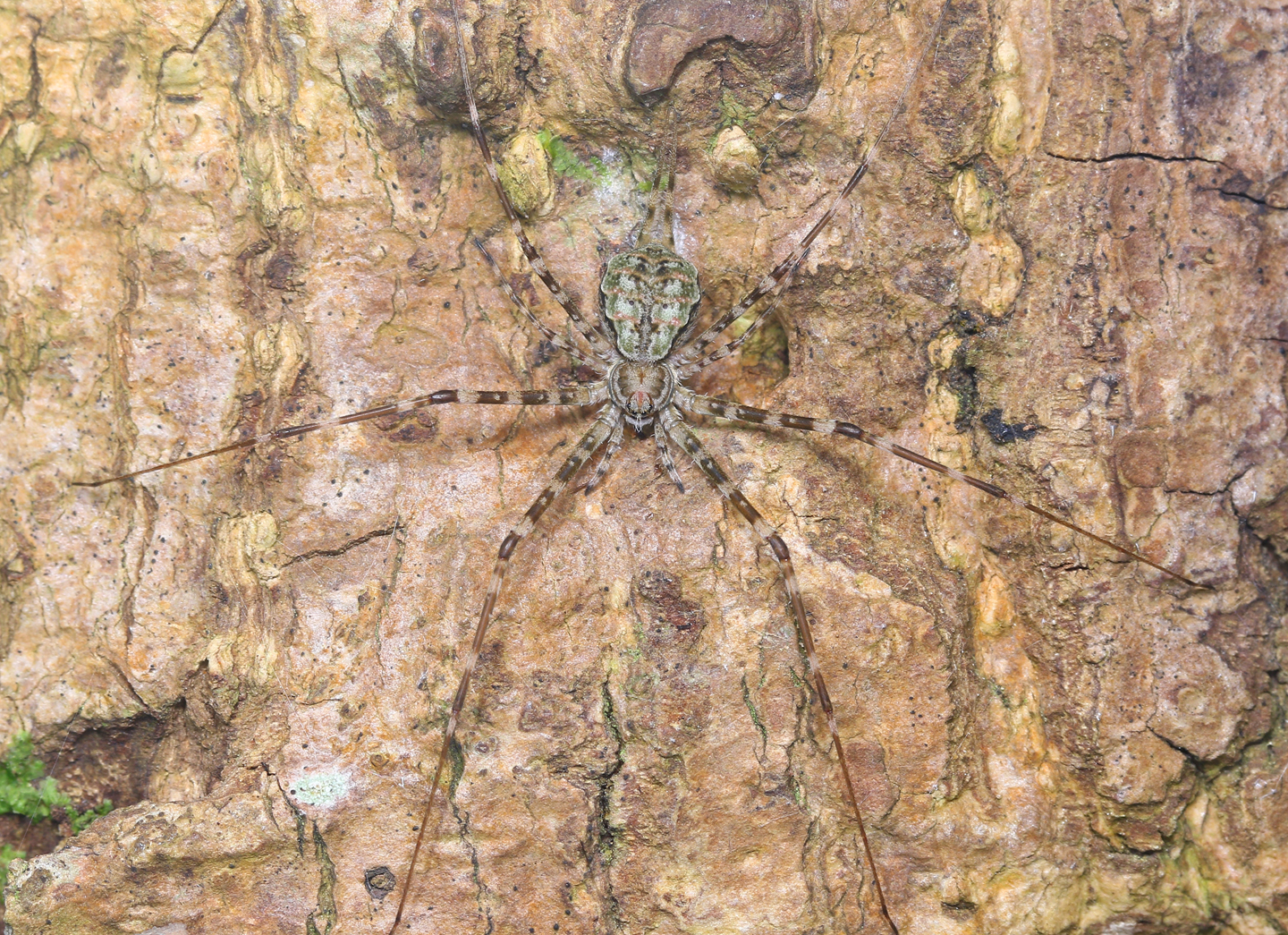
H. striata from China

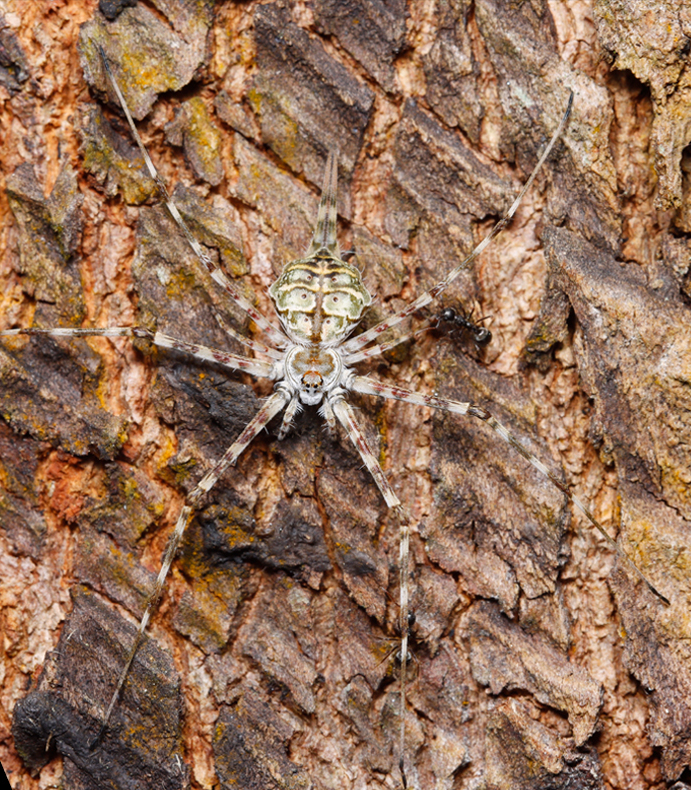
H. sumatrana from China

The revisions by Baehr & Baehr and Rheims & Brescovit revealed 26 species in southeast Asia.

As of September 2025, this genus includes eighty species:

- Hersilia albicomis Simon, 1887 – Equatorial Guinea, Ghana, Ivory Coast, Nigeria
- Hersilia albinota M. Baehr & B. Baehr, 1993 – China
- Hersilia albomaculata Wang & Yin, 1985 – China
- Hersilia aldabrensis Foord & Dippenaar-Schoeman, 2006 – Comoros, Seychelles
- Hersilia alluaudi Berland, 1920 – Democratic Republic of the Congo, Tanzania
- Hersilia aoqin Lin & Li, 2022 – China
- Hersilia arborea Lawrence, 1928 – Namibia, South Africa, Zimbabwe
- Hersilia asiatica Song & Zheng, 1982 – China, Taiwan, Laos, Thailand
- Hersilia australiensis B. Baehr & M. Baehr, 1987 – Australia
- Hersilia baforti Benoit, 1967 – Democratic Republic of the Congo, Uganda
- Hersilia baliensis M. Baehr & B. Baehr, 1993 – Indonesia, Laos
- Hersilia bifurcata B. Baehr & M. Baehr, 1998 – Australia
- Hersilia bubi Foord & Dippenaar-Schoeman, 2006 – Equatorial Guinea, Uganda
- Hersilia caronae Foord & Dippenaar-Schoeman, 2006 – Ivory Coast
- Hersilia caudata Audouin, 1826 – Cape Verde, West Africa to China (type species)
- Hersilia clarki Benoit, 1967 – Zimbabwe
- Hersilia clypealis M. Baehr & B. Baehr, 1993 – Thailand
- Hersilia deelemanae M. Baehr & B. Baehr, 1993 – Indonesia
- Hersilia eloetsensis Foord & Dippenaar-Schoeman, 2006 – Madagascar
- Hersilia facialis M. Baehr & B. Baehr, 1993 – Indonesia
- Hersilia feai M. Baehr & B. Baehr, 1993 – Myanmar
- Hersilia flagellifera M. Baehr & B. Baehr, 1993 – Indonesia, Laos
- Hersilia furcata Foord & Dippenaar-Schoeman, 2006 – Democratic Republic of the Congo
- Hersilia hildebrandti Karsch, 1878 – Tanzania
- Hersilia igiti Foord & Dippenaar-Schoeman, 2006 – Rwanda
- Hersilia impressifrons M. Baehr & B. Baehr, 1993 – Indonesia
- Hersilia incompta Benoit, 1971 – Ivory Coast
- Hersilia insulana Strand, 1907 – Madagascar
- Hersilia jajat Rheims & Brescovit, 2004 – Malaysia
- Hersilia kerekot Rheims & Brescovit, 2004 – Malaysia
- Hersilia kinabaluensis M. Baehr & B. Baehr, 1993 – Malaysia
- Hersilia lelabah Rheims & Brescovit, 2004 – China, Malaysia
- Hersilia long Lin & Li, 2022 – China
- Hersilia longbottomi B. Baehr & M. Baehr, 1998 – Australia
- Hersilia longivulva Sen, Saha & Raychaudhuri, 2010 – India
- Hersilia madagascariensis (Wunderlich, 2004) – Comoros, Madagascar
- Hersilia madang M. Baehr & B. Baehr, 1993 – Papua New Guinea
- Hersilia mainae B. Baehr & M. Baehr, 1995 – Australia
- Hersilia martensi M. Baehr & B. Baehr, 1993 – China, Thailand, Nepal
- Hersilia mboszi Foord & Dippenaar-Schoeman, 2006 – Cameroon, Ivory Coast
- Hersilia mimbi M. Baehr & B. Baehr, 1993 – Australia
- Hersilia mjoebergi M. Baehr & B. Baehr, 1993 – Indonesia
- Hersilia moheliensis Foord & Dippenaar-Schoeman, 2006 – Comoros, Madagascar
- Hersilia montana Chen, 2007 – Taiwan
- Hersilia mowomogbe Foord & Dippenaar-Schoeman, 2006 – Cameroon, Democratic Republic of the Congo
- Hersilia nentwigi M. Baehr & B. Baehr, 1993 – Indonesia
- Hersilia nepalensis M. Baehr & B. Baehr, 1993 – India, Nepal
- Hersilia novaeguineae M. Baehr & B. Baehr, 1993 – New Guinea
- Hersilia occidentalis Simon, 1907 – Central, East Africa, West
- Hersilia okinawaensis Tanikawa, 1999 – Japan
- Hersilia orvakalensis Javed, Foord & Tampal, 2010 – India
- Hersilia pungwensis Tucker, 1920 – Zimbabwe
- Hersilia sagada Lin & Li, 2022 – Philippines
- Hersilia sagitta Foord & Dippenaar-Schoeman, 2006 – Kenya, Malawi, Tanzania, South Africa
- Hersilia savignyi Lucas, 1836 – India, Nepal, Pakistan, Sri Lanka to Philippines
- Hersilia scrupulosa Foord & Dippenaar-Schoeman, 2006 – Kenya, India
- Hersilia selempoi Foord & Dippenaar-Schoeman, 2006 – Kenya
- Hersilia sericea Pocock, 1898 – Africa
- Hersilia serrata Dankittipakul & Singtripop, 2011 – Thailand
- Hersilia setifrons Lawrence, 1928 – Angola, Namibia, South Africa, Zimbabwe
- Hersilia sigillata Benoit, 1967 – Democratic Republic of the Congo, Gabon, Uganda, Ivory Coast
- Hersilia simplicipalpis M. Baehr & B. Baehr, 1993 – Thailand
- Hersilia striata Wang & Yin, 1985 – China, Taiwan, Indonesia, Myanmar, Thailand, India
- Hersilia sumatrana (Thorell, 1890) – Asia
- Hersilia sundaica M. Baehr & B. Baehr, 1993 – Indonesia, Thailand
- Hersilia taita Foord & Dippenaar-Schoeman, 2006 – Kenya
- Hersilia taiwanensis Chen, 2007 – Taiwan
- Hersilia talebii Mirshamsi, Zamani & Marusik, 2016 – Iran
- Hersilia tamatavensis Foord & Dippenaar-Schoeman, 2006 – Madagascar
- Hersilia tenuifurcata B. Baehr & M. Baehr, 1998 – Australia
- Hersilia thailandica Dankittipakul & Singtripop, 2011 – Thailand
- Hersilia tibialis M. Baehr & B. Baehr, 1993 – India, Sri Lanka
- Hersilia tortuosa Wen & Xu, 2022 – China
- Hersilia vanmoli Benoit, 1971 – Ivory Coast, Togo
- Hersilia vicina M. Baehr & B. Baehr, 1993 – China, Thailand
- Hersilia vinsoni Lucas, 1869 – Madagascar
- Hersilia wellswebberae B. Baehr & M. Baehr, 1998 – Australia
- Hersilia wraniki Rheims, Brescovit & van Harten, 2004 – Yemen
- Hersilia xieae Yin, 2012 – China
- Hersilia yaeyamaensis Tanikawa, 1999 – Japan
