= Yabisi =

Scientific classification
- Domain: Eukaryota
- Kingdom: Animalia
- Phylum: Arthropoda
- Subphylum: Chelicerata
- Class: Arachnida
- Order: Araneae
- Infraorder: Araneomorphae
- Family: Hersiliidae
- Genus: Yabisi; Rheims & Brescovit, 2004

Type species
- Y. habanensis (Franganillo, 1936)

Species
- Y. guaba Rheims & Brescovit, 2004 – Dominican Rep.; Y. habanensis (Franganillo, 1936) – USA, Cuba

Genus of spiders

Yabisi is a genus of tree trunk spiders that was first described by C. A. Rheims & A. D. Brescovit in 2004. As of May 2019 it contains only two species: Y. guaba and Y. habanensis.
