= Ypypuera =

Scientific classification
- Domain: Eukaryota
- Kingdom: Animalia
- Phylum: Arthropoda
- Subphylum: Chelicerata
- Class: Arachnida
- Order: Araneae
- Infraorder: Araneomorphae
- Family: Hersiliidae
- Genus: Ypypuera; Rheims & Brescovit, 2004

Type species
- Y. crucifera (Vellard, 1924)

Species
- Y. crucifera (Vellard, 1924) – Venezuela to Argentina; Y. esquisita Rheims & Brescovit, 2004 – Ecuador; Y. vittata (Simon, 1887) – Venezuela, Peru, Brazil, Suriname

Genus of spiders

Ypypuera is a genus of South American tree trunk spiders that was first described by C. A. Rheims & A. D. Brescovit in 2004. As of May 2019 it contains only three species: Y. crucifera, Y. esquisita, and Y. vittata.
