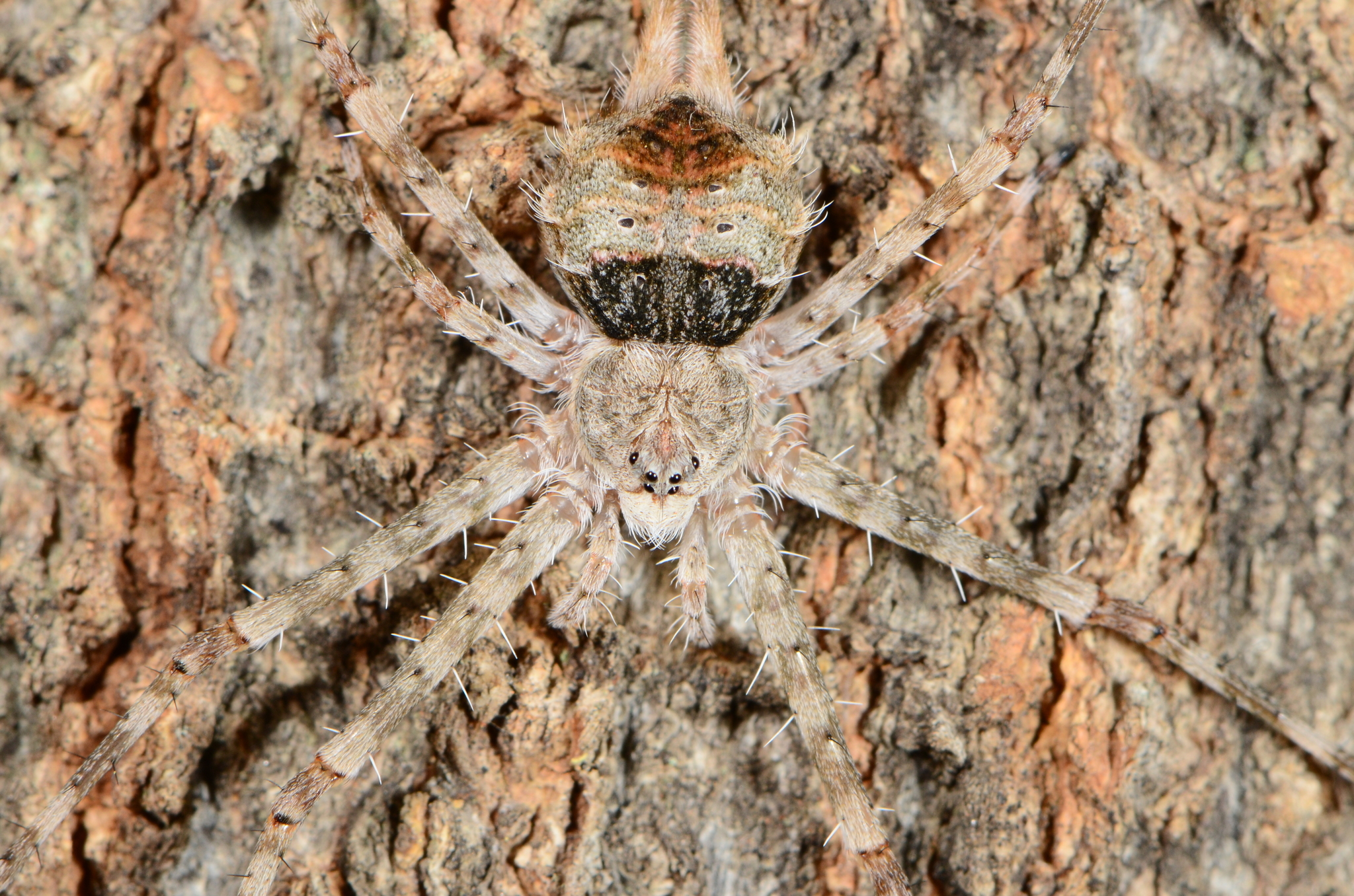
- Female
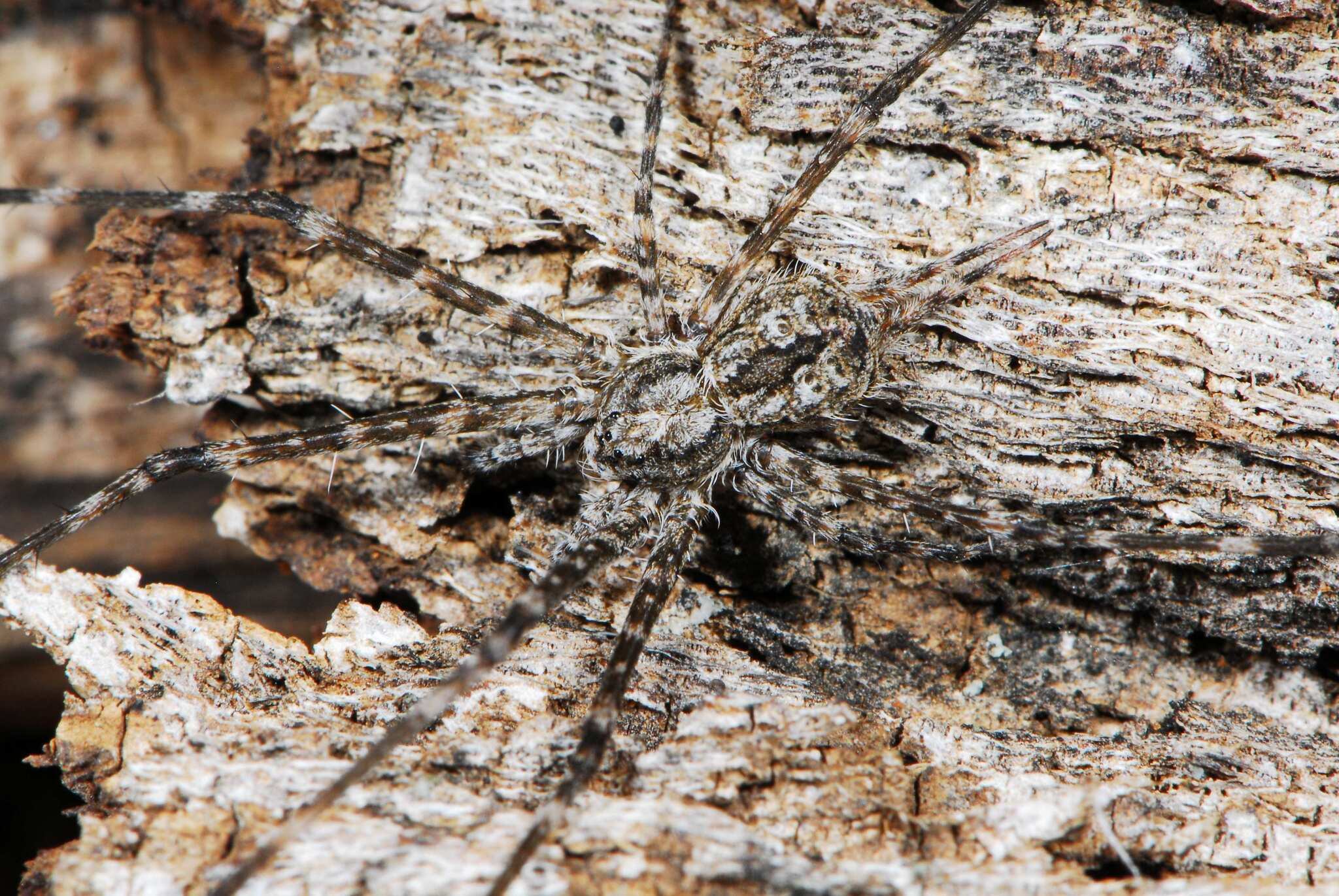
- Female

Scientific classification
- Kingdom: Animalia
- Phylum: Arthropoda
- Subphylum: Chelicerata
- Class: Arachnida
- Order: Araneae
- Infraorder: Araneomorphae
- Family: Hersiliidae
- Genus: Hersilia
- Species: H. sericea

Binomial name
- Hersilia sericea Pocock, 1898

Synonyms
- Hersilia bicornis Tucker, 1920; Hersilia pungwensis Tucker, 1920; Hersilia hanströmi Kauri, 1950

= Hersilia sericea =

Common Long-spinneret Tree Spider

Species of spider

Hersilia sericea is a species of spider in the family Hersiliidae. It is an African endemic and is commonly known as the common Long-spinneret tree spider.

== Distribution ==
Hersilia sericea is found in Botswana, Kenya, Tanzania, Mozambique, Zimbabwe, Eswatini, and South Africa. In South Africa, the species is widely distributed across eight of the nine provinces.

== Habitat ==
The species occurs in multiple biomes including Forest, Grassland, Nama Karoo, Savanna, and Thicket biomes at altitudes ranging from 4 to 1,471 m above sea level.

It has also been recorded from agricultural areas including avocado, citrus, grapefruit, and macadamia orchards, as well as urban environments.

== Description ==
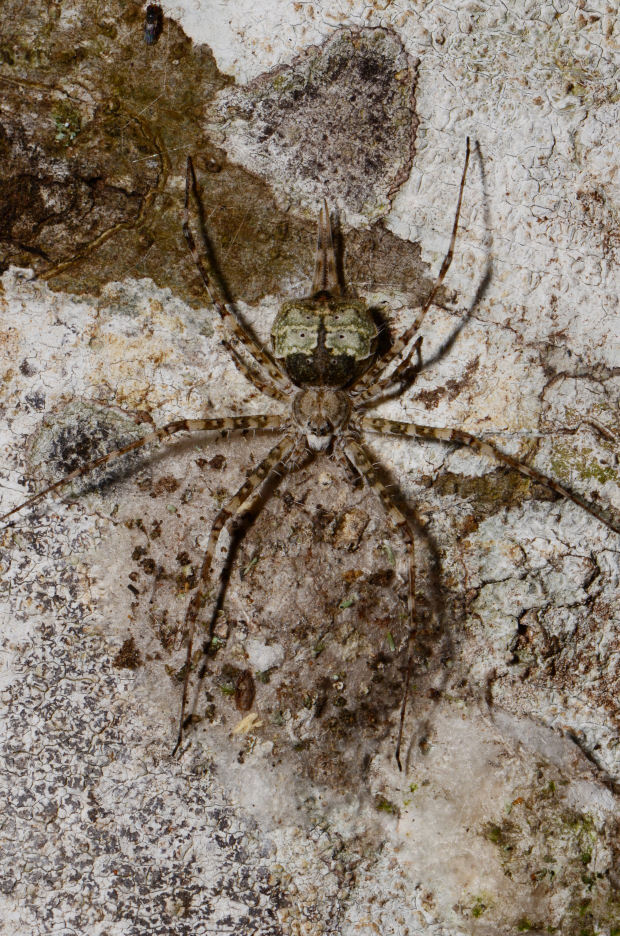
female

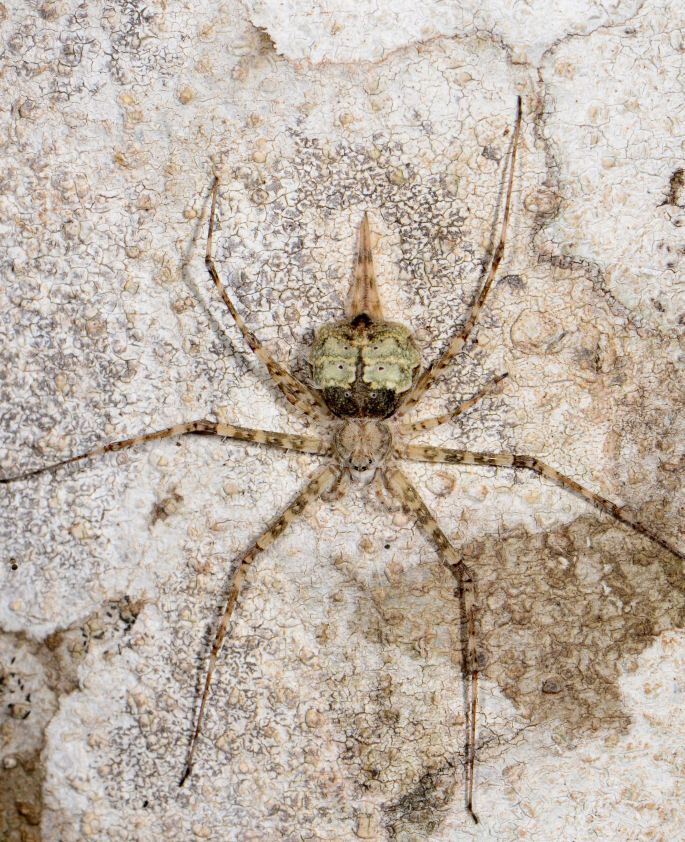
female

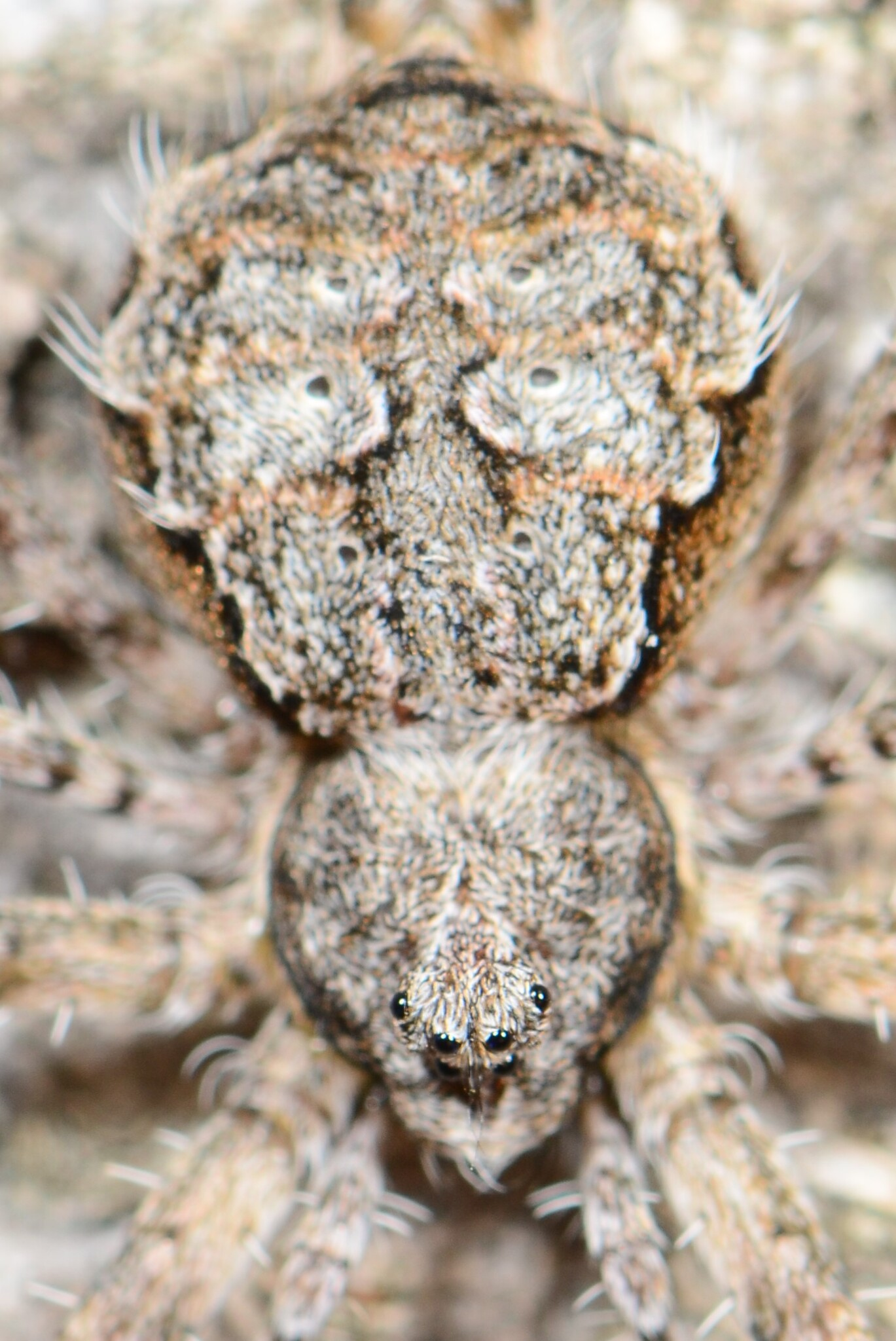
female

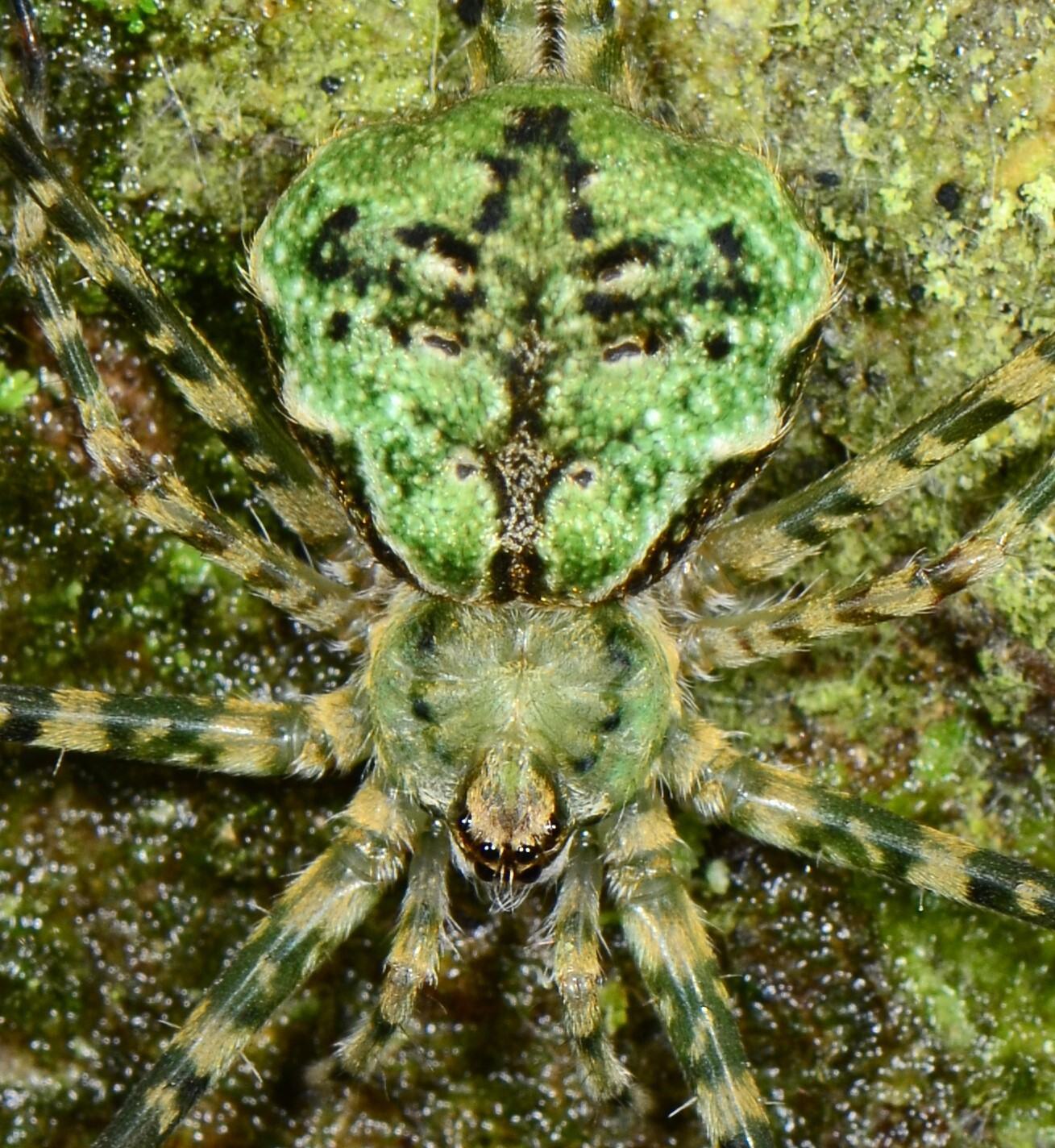
female

Hersilia sericea is known from both sexes. Like other members of the genus Hersilia, it exhibits a flattened body form and extremely long posterior spinnerets.

== Ecology ==
This species is a free-living bark dweller found on various tree species. It does not appear to prefer specific tree species for habitation, although tree trunk size may influence habitat selection. Females construct flat, oval-shaped egg sacs on tree trunk surfaces, camouflaged with bark fragments. The female guards these eggs in an upside-down position until emergence. Females have been collected throughout the year, while males are found from April through December. Some specimens have been collected from walls in built-up areas.

== Conservation ==
Hersilia sericea is listed as Least Concern by the South African National Biodiversity Institute due to its extensive distribution range. The species is protected in more than ten protected areas and faces no significant threats.

== Taxonomy ==
The species was originally described by Reginald Innes Pocock in 1898 from Estcourt in South Africa. Foord & Dippenaar-Schoeman (2006) synonymized Hersilia bicornis Tucker, 1920 and Hersilia hanströmi Kauri, 1950 with this species.
