= Iviraiva =

Scientific classification
- Domain: Eukaryota
- Kingdom: Animalia
- Phylum: Arthropoda
- Subphylum: Chelicerata
- Class: Arachnida
- Order: Araneae
- Infraorder: Araneomorphae
- Family: Hersiliidae
- Genus: Iviraiva; Rheims & Brescovit, 2004

Type species
- I. pachyura (Mello-Leitão, 1935)

Species
- I. argentina (Mello-Leitão, 1942) – Brazil, Bolivia, Paraguay, Argentina; I. pachyura (Mello-Leitão, 1935) – Brazil, Paraguay, Argentina, Uruguay

Genus of spiders

Iviraiva is a genus of South American tree trunk spiders that was first described by C. A. Rheims & Antônio Brescovit in 2004. As of May 2019 it contains only two species: I. argentina and I. pachyura.
