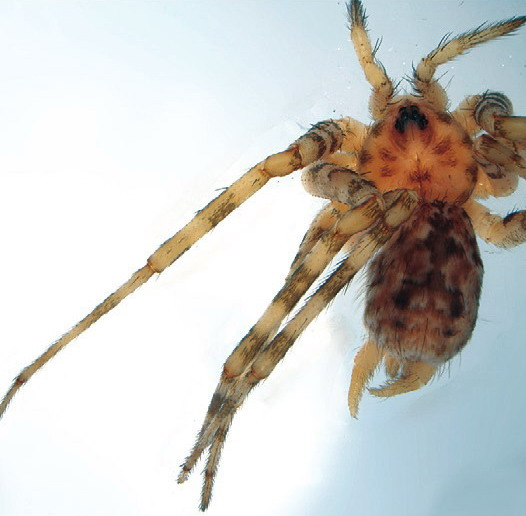
- D. gromovi

Scientific classification
- Kingdom: Animalia
- Phylum: Arthropoda
- Subphylum: Chelicerata
- Class: Arachnida
- Order: Araneae
- Infraorder: Araneomorphae
- Family: Hersiliidae
- Genus: Deltshevia; Marusik & Fet, 2009

Type species
- D. danovi Marusik & Fet, 2009

Species
- D. danovi Marusik & Fet, 2009 – Turkmenistan, Kazakhstan; D. gromovi Marusik & Fet, 2009 – Uzbekistan, Kazakhstan

= Deltshevia =

Genus of spiders

Deltshevia is a genus of Asian tree trunk spiders that was first described by Yuri M. Marusik & Victor R. Fet in 2009. As of May 2019 it contains only two species: D. danovi and D. gromovi.
