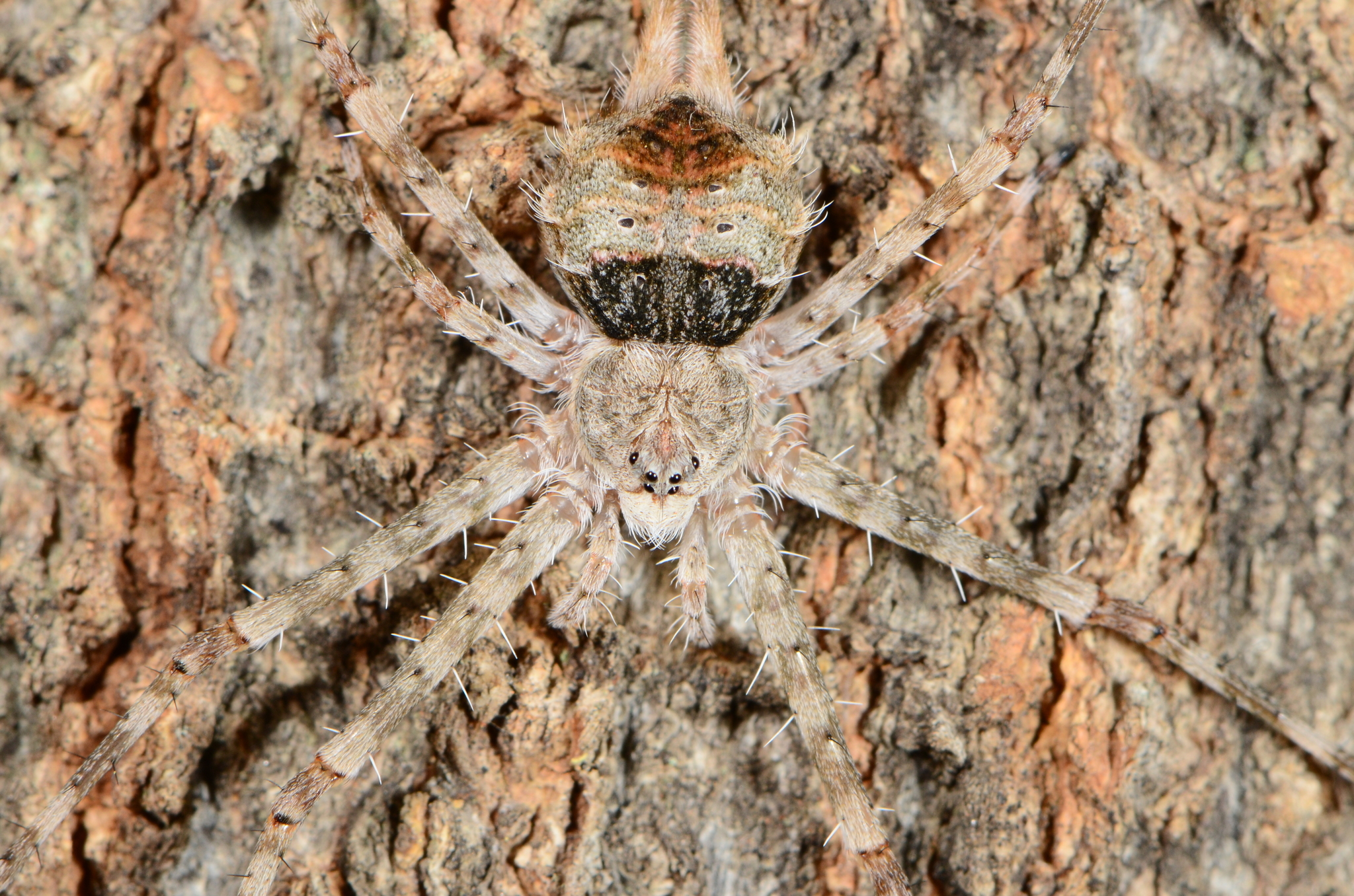
- female H. sericea from South Africa
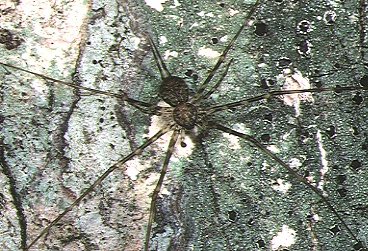
- Male Hersilia okinawaensis

Scientific classification
- Kingdom: Animalia
- Phylum: Arthropoda
- Subphylum: Chelicerata
- Class: Arachnida
- Order: Araneae
- Infraorder: Araneomorphae
- Family: Hersiliidae; Thorell, 1869

Diversity
- 16 genera, 189 species
- blue: reported countries (WSC) green: observation hotspots (iNaturalist)

= Tree trunk spider =

Tree trunk spider Temporal range: Cretaceous–present

Family of spiders

Hersiliidae is a tropical and subtropical family of spiders first described by Tamerlan Thorell in 1869, which are commonly known as tree trunk spiders. They have two prominent spinnerets that are almost as long as their abdomen, earning them another nickname, the "two-tailed spiders". They range in size from 10 to 18 mm (0.4 to 0.7 in) long.

== Behavior ==
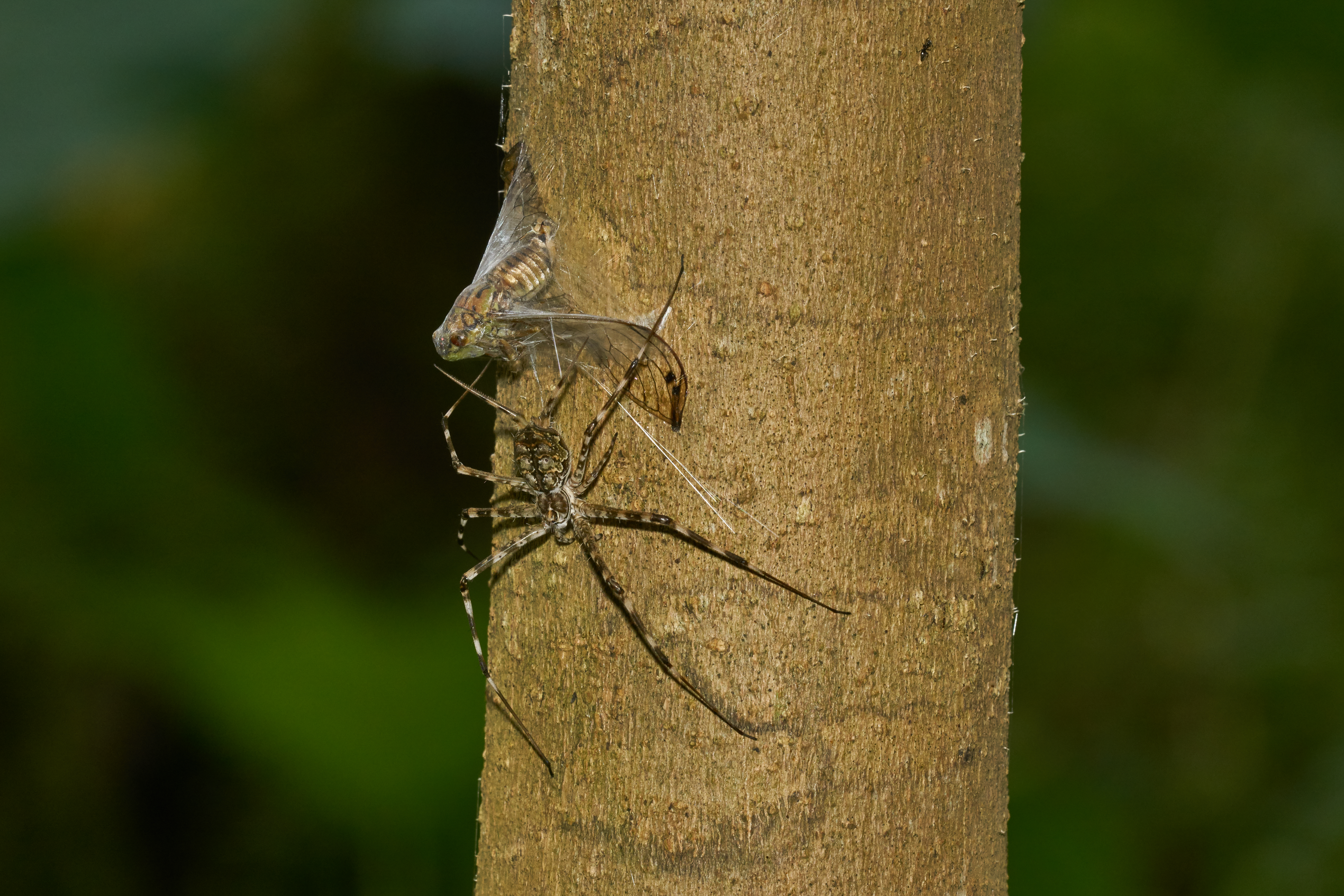
A Hersilia species immobilizing a cicada

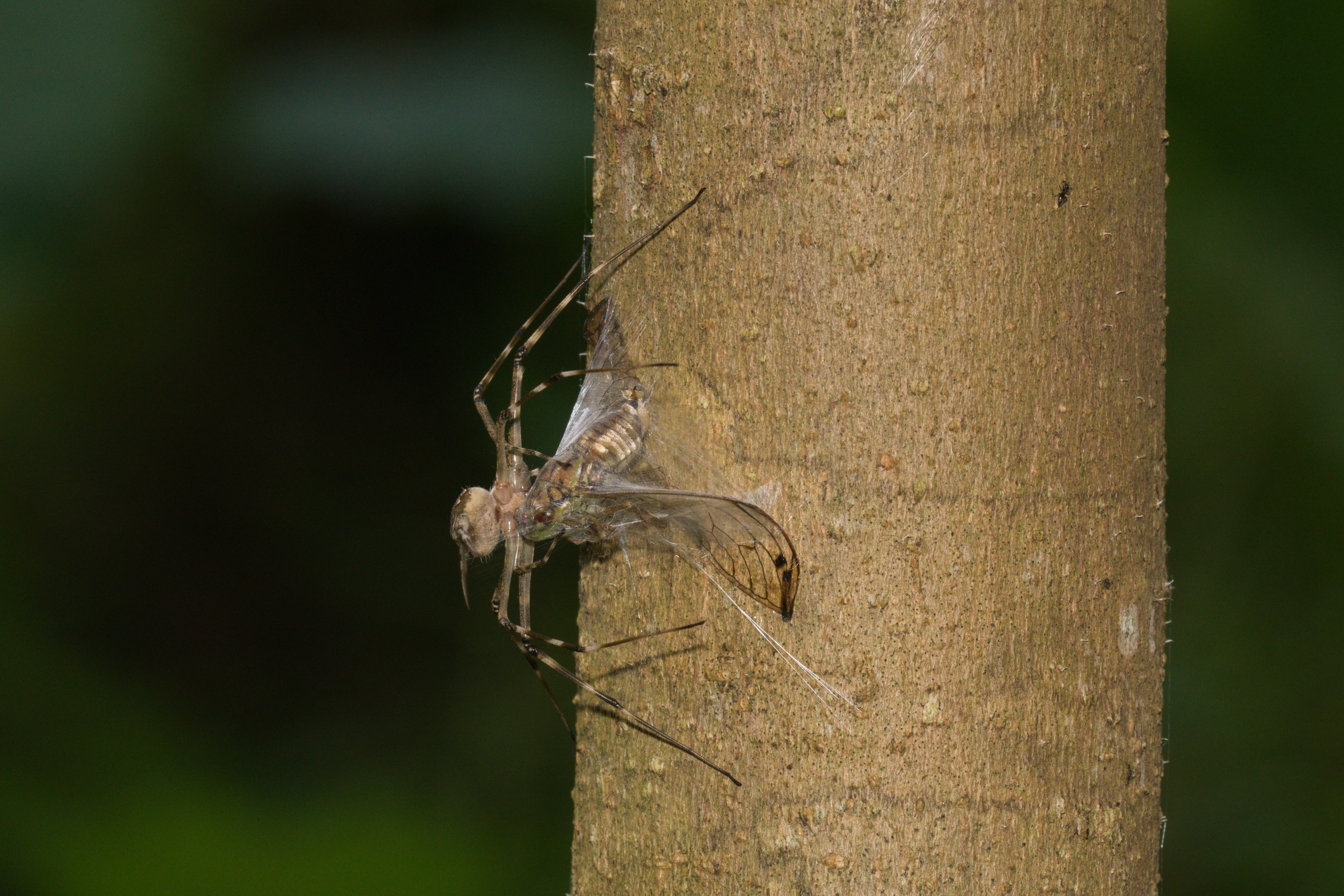
Injecting venom through the shroud

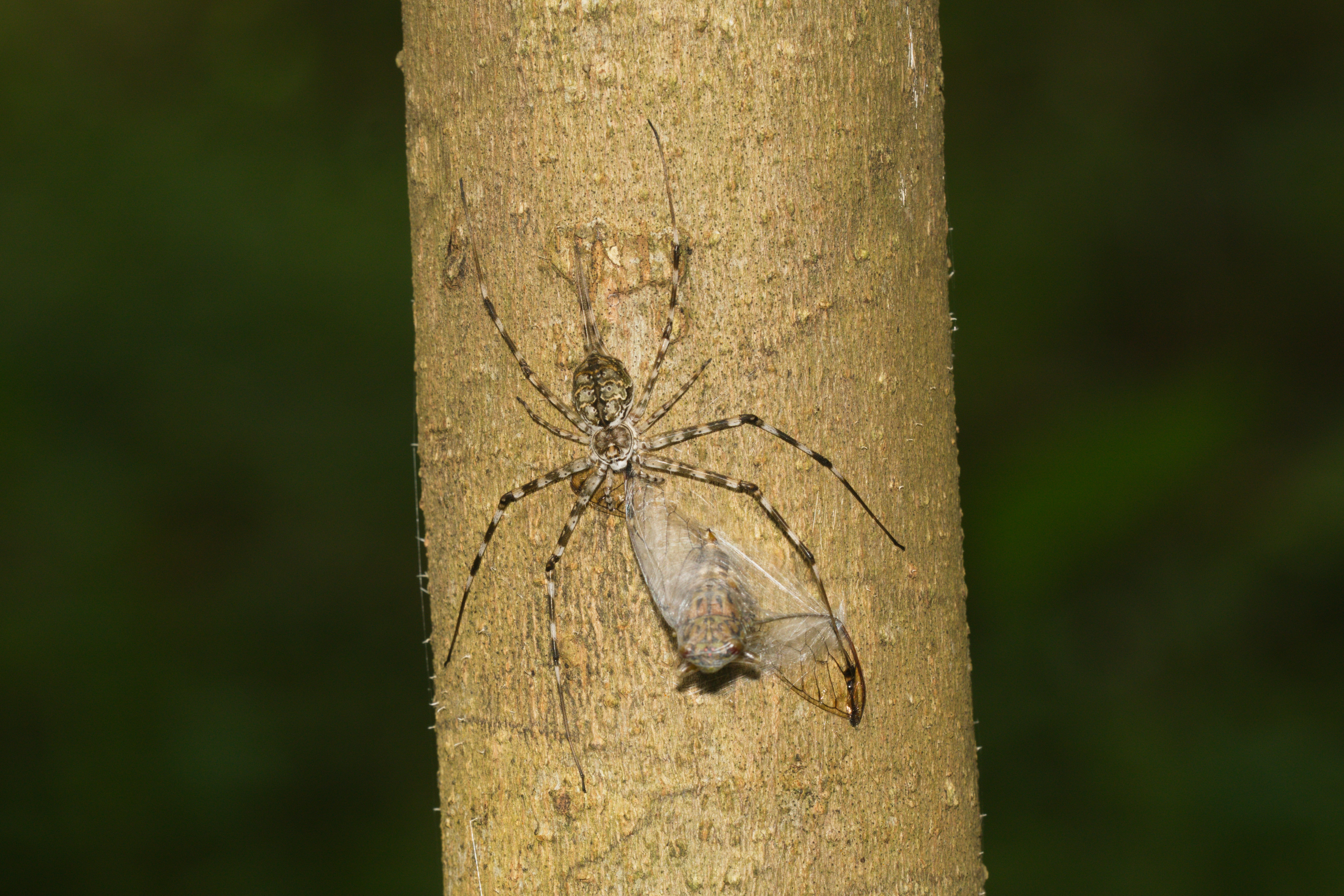
Fully immobilized the cicada

Rather than using a web that captures prey directly, they lay a light coating of threads over an area of tree bark and wait for an insect to stray onto the patch. When this happens, they encircle their spinnerets around their prey while casting silk on it. When the insect is immobilized, they can bite it through the shroud.

== Diversity ==
Hersiliidae is an entelegyne family (characterized primarily by the nature of the female genital system), and together with the family Oecobiidae traditionally formed the superfamily Oecobioidea.

The family consists of about 206 species divided into sixteen genera. It has a global distribution in tropical and subtropical regions, with only a few species being found north of the 40°N parallel.

== Description ==
All members are ecribellate (lack the cribella or perforated plates which produce multiple, exceptionally fine strands of silk) and are recognizable by the pair of exceptionally long spinnerets set at the tip of the abdomen.

They have eight eyes, set in two curved rows. Hersiliidae are small to medium-sized spiders and are active day and night. They are very well camouflaged when stationary on the trunk of a tree and aligned with the bark markings.

== Genera ==
As of January 2026, this family includes sixteen genera and 189 species:

- Bastanius Mirshamsi, Zamani & Marusik, 2016 – Iran
- Deltshevia Marusik & Fet, 2009 – Kazakhstan, Turkmenistan, Uzbekistan, Iran
- Duninia Marusik & Fet, 2009 – Turkmenistan, Iran
- Hersilia Audouin, 1826 – Africa, Asia, Australia, New Guinea, Papua New Guinea
- Hersiliola Thorell, 1869 – Algeria, Sudan, Cape Verde, Mali, Asia, Spain
- Iviraiva Rheims & Brescovit, 2004 – South America
- Murricia Simon, 1882 – China, Singapore, India, Sri Lanka
- Neotama M. Baehr & B. Baehr, 1993 – South Africa, Indonesia, India, Sri Lanka, South America
- Ovtsharenkoia Marusik & Fet, 2009 – Central Asia
- Prima Foord, 2008 – Madagascar
- Promurricia M. Baehr & B. Baehr, 1993 – Sri Lanka
- Tama Simon, 1882 – Algeria, Morocco, Portugal, Spain
- Tamopsis B. Baehr & M. Baehr, 1987 – Australia, New Guinea, Borneo
- Tyrotama Foord & Dippenaar-Schoeman, 2005 – Angola, Southern Africa
- Yabisi Rheims & Brescovit, 2004 – Cuba, Dominican Republic, United States
- Ypypuera Rheims & Brescovit, 2004 – South America

=== Extinct genera ===
- †Burmesiola Wunderlich 2011 Burmese amber, Myanmar, Cenomanian
- †Fictotama Petrunkevitch 1963 Dominican amber, Miocene
- †Gerdia Menge 1869 Baltic amber, Eocene
- †Gerdiopsis Wunderlich 2004 Baltic amber, Eocene
- †Gerdiorum Wunderlich 2004 Baltic amber, Eocene
