= Palystes karooensis =

Karoo rain spider

Scientific classification
- Kingdom: Animalia
- Phylum: Arthropoda
- Subphylum: Chelicerata
- Class: Arachnida
- Order: Araneae
- Infraorder: Araneomorphae
- Family: Sparassidae
- Genus: Palystes
- Species: P. karooensis

Binomial name
- Palystes karooensis Croeser, 1996

Species of spider

Palystes karooensis is a spider species in the family Sparassidae. It is endemic to South Africa and is commonly known as the Karoo rain spider.

== Distribution ==
Palystes karooensis is found in the Eastern Cape, KwaZulu-Natal, and Western Cape provinces. The species occurs in three protected areas including Karoo National Park and Swartberg Nature Reserve. Notable localities include Aberdeen, Cradock, Graaff-Reinet, Beaufort West, and Worcester.

== Habitat and ecology ==
Palystes karooensis is a nocturnal hunting spider. During the day, adults are inactive and shelter under loose bark, on vegetation, or in any suitable crevice. The species has been sampled from the Grassland, Nama Karoo, and Thicket biomes at altitudes ranging from 7 to 1,446 m.

== Conservation ==
Palystes karooensis is listed as Least Concern by the South African National Biodiversity Institute due to its wide geographical range. The species is protected in Karoo National Park and Swartberg Nature Reserve.
