= Palystella =

Scientific classification
- Kingdom: Animalia
- Phylum: Arthropoda
- Subphylum: Chelicerata
- Class: Arachnida
- Order: Araneae
- Infraorder: Araneomorphae
- Family: Sparassidae
- Genus: Palystella; Lawrence, 1928

Type species
- P. sexmaculata Lawrence, 1928

Species
- 4, see text

Genus of spiders

Palystella is a southern African genus of huntsman spiders that was first described by R. F. Lawrence in 1928.

== Distribution ==
Species in this genus are found in Namibia and South Africa.

=== Description ===
Palystella species have a total body length of 17 to 25 mm.

The carapace is longer than wide, convex anteriorly, and lightly and regularly arched above. The cephalic portion is higher than in Palystes.

The eyes occupy more than half of the anterior width of the carapace. The anterior eye row is recurved, with the lateral eyes much larger than the median eyes. The posterior eye row is straight with equidistant eyes. The posterior lateral eyes are decidedly larger than the median eyes and equal to the anterior lateral eyes. The median quadrangle is much longer than wide. The clypeus is wider than an anterior lateral eye.

The chelicerae are stout, with the inferior margin bearing three robust teeth. The labium is very short, shorter than in Palystes, truncated apically, reaching to about a fourth the length of the maxillae. The maxillae do not stand vertical as in Palystes but diverge outwards, with the apices more pointed distally than in Palystes. The sternum is as wide as long, almost circular.

The leg formula is 2431, with legs more or less equal in length and spined as in Palystes.

=== Life style ===
Palystella species are found on the soil surface.

=== Taxonomy ===
The genus Palystella was described by Lawrence in 1928 based on four species from Namibia. Two of these species have also been sampled from South Africa. The genus has not been revised.

== Species ==
As of September 2025, this genus includes four species, all endemic to southern Africa:

- Palystella browni Lawrence, 1962 – Namibia
- Palystella namaquensis Lawrence, 1938 – Namibia, South Africa
- Palystella pallida Lawrence, 1938 – South Africa
- Palystella sexmaculata Lawrence, 1928 – Namibia (type species)
