= Palystella pallida =

Port Nolloth palystella huntsman spider

Scientific classification
- Kingdom: Animalia
- Phylum: Arthropoda
- Subphylum: Chelicerata
- Class: Arachnida
- Order: Araneae
- Infraorder: Araneomorphae
- Family: Sparassidae
- Genus: Palystella
- Species: P. pallida

Binomial name
- Palystella pallida Lawrence, 1938

Synonyms
- Palystella pallidus Lawrence, 1938

Species of spider

Palystella pallida is a spider species in the family Sparassidae. It is endemic to South Africa and is commonly known as the Port Nolloth palystella huntsman spider.

== Distribution ==
Palystella pallida is found in the Northern Cape and Western Cape provinces of South Africa. Notable locations include the Cederberg Wilderness Area and Swartberg Nature Reserve.

== Habitat and ecology ==
Palystella pallida is a free-running ground dweller sampled from the Fynbos Biome using pitfall traps. The species occurs at altitudes ranging from 14 to 1,210 m.

== Conservation ==
Palystella pallida is listed as Least Concern by the South African National Biodiversity Institute due to its large range. Much natural habitat remains within this species' range, and it is protected in the Swartberg Nature Reserve. The species is suspected to be under-sampled.
