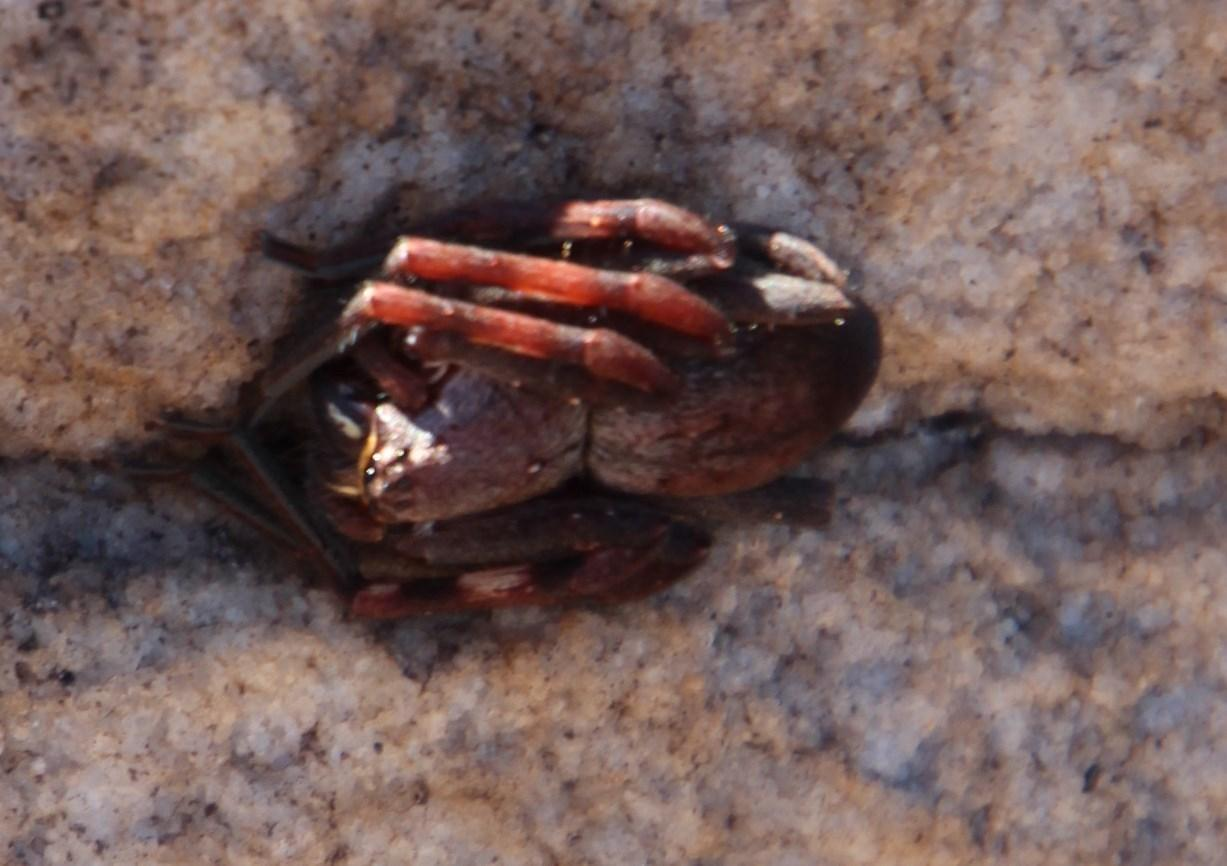

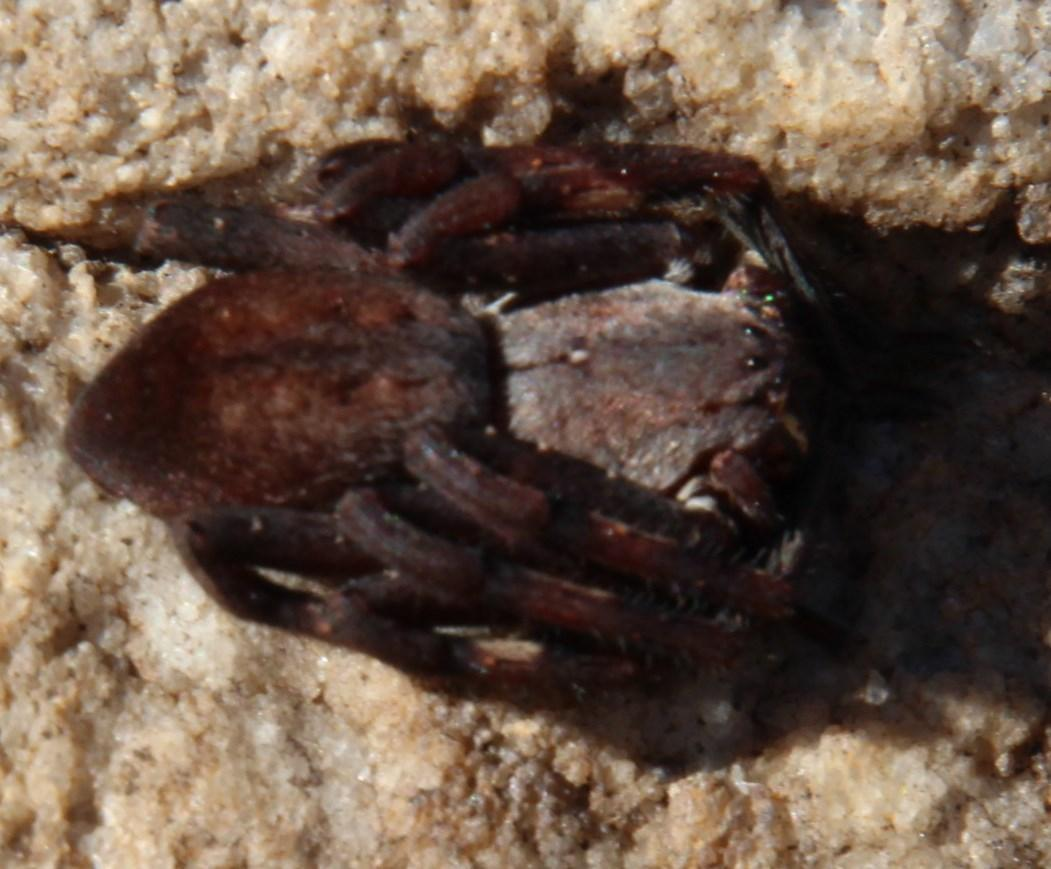

Scientific classification
- Kingdom: Animalia
- Phylum: Arthropoda
- Subphylum: Chelicerata
- Class: Arachnida
- Order: Araneae
- Infraorder: Araneomorphae
- Family: Sparassidae
- Genus: Palystes
- Species: P. stilleri

Binomial name
- Palystes stilleri Croeser, 1996

= Palystes stilleri =

Stiller's rain spider

Species of spider

Palystes stilleri is a spider species in the family Sparassidae. It is endemic to South Africa and is commonly known as Stiller's rain spider.

== Distribution ==
Palystes stilleri is found in the Northern Cape and Western Cape provinces. The species has been sampled from the Hottentots Holland Mountains, and it is protected in Oorlogskloof Nature Reserve, Jonkershoek Nature Reserve, and Swartberg Nature Reserve. It occurs at altitudes ranging from 27 to 701 m.

== Habitat and ecology ==
During the day, adults are inactive and shelter under loose bark, rotten logs or stones, or in any suitable crevice. One specimen was sampled from a rotting log in the Fynbos Biome.

== Conservation ==
Palystes stilleri is listed as Least Concern by the South African National Biodiversity Institute due to its wide geographic range. The species is protected in Swartberg Nature Reserve, Oorlogskloof Nature Reserve, and Jonkershoek Nature Reserve.
