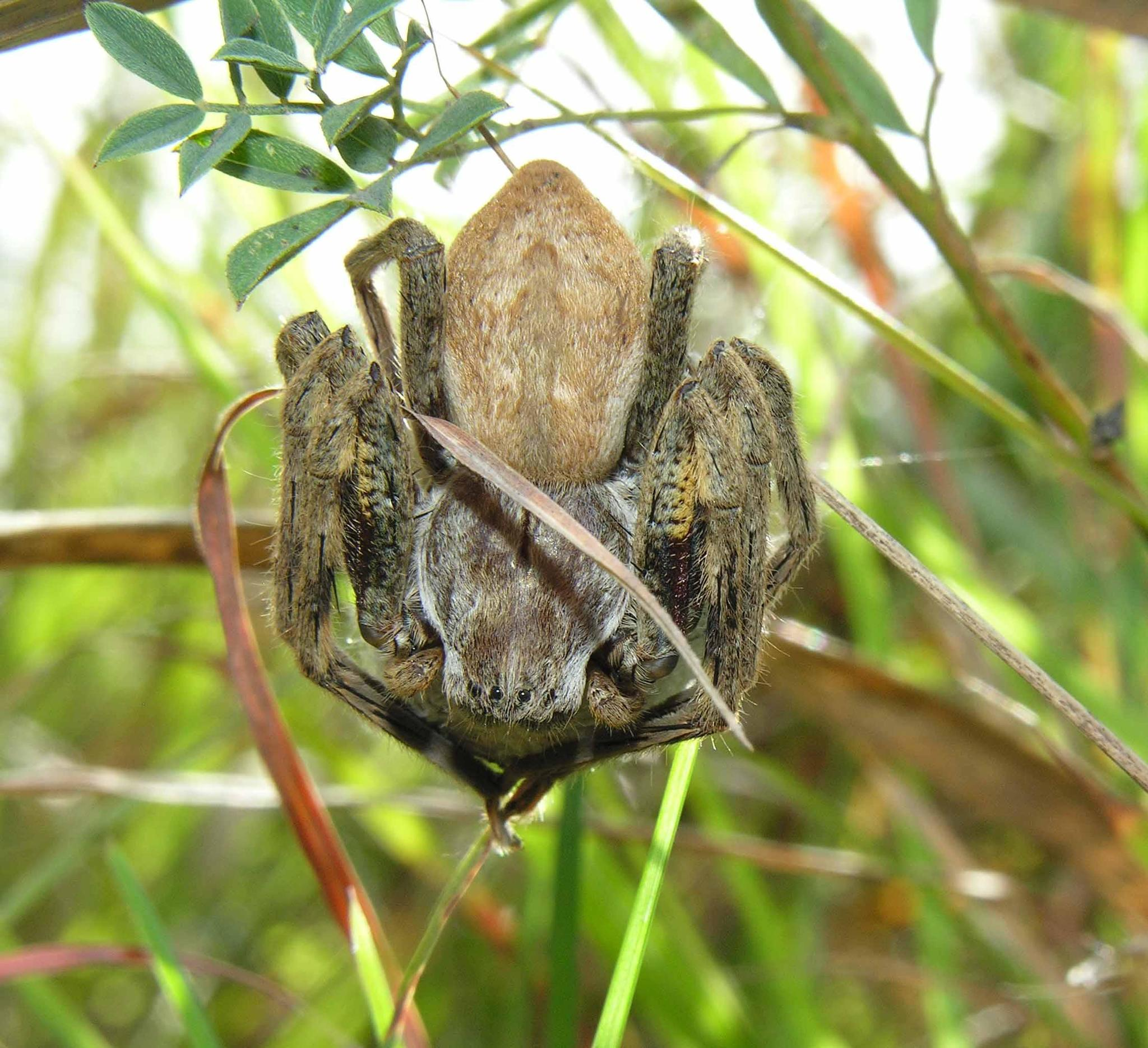
- female
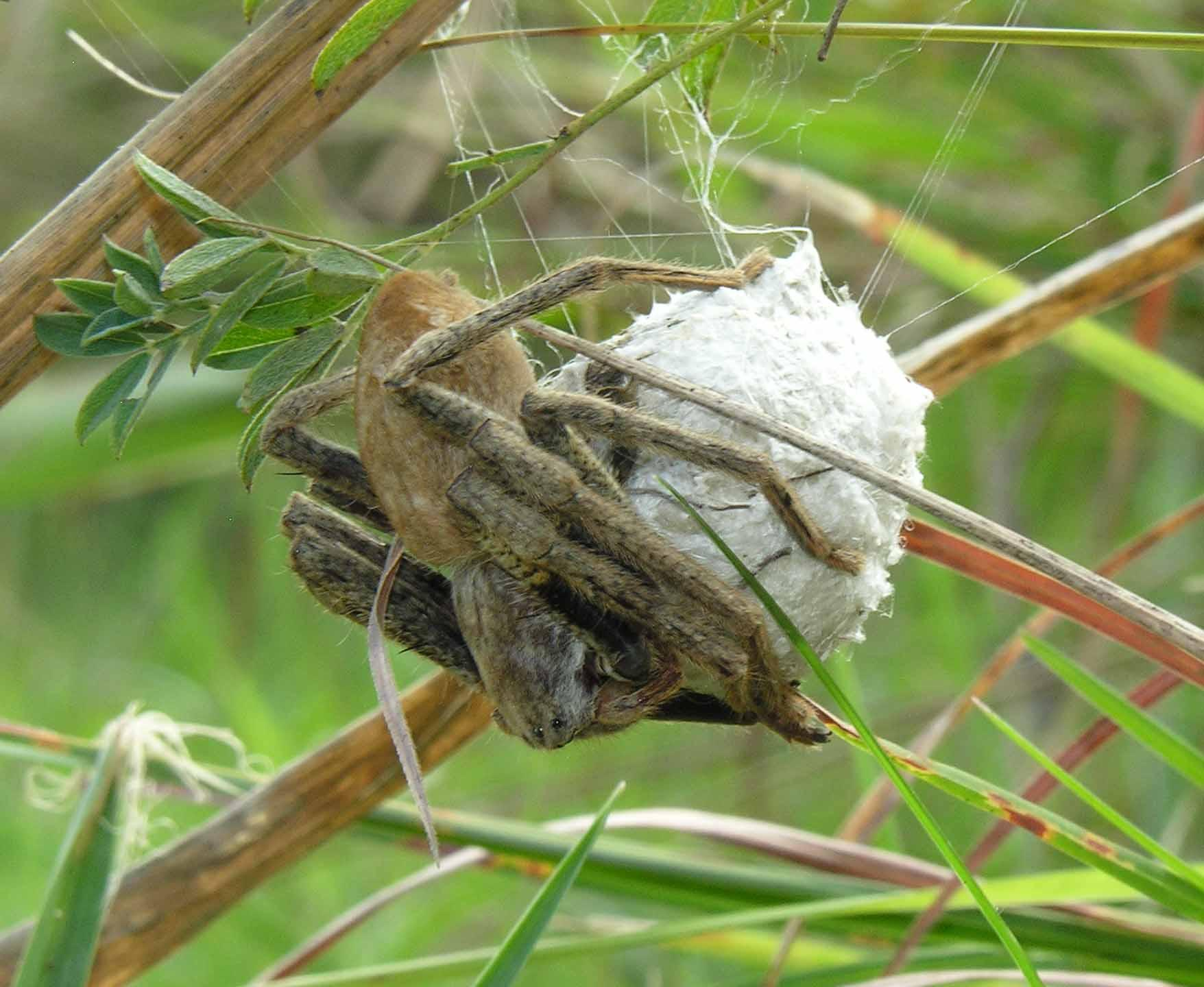
- female with egg sac

Scientific classification
- Kingdom: Animalia
- Phylum: Arthropoda
- Subphylum: Chelicerata
- Class: Arachnida
- Order: Araneae
- Infraorder: Araneomorphae
- Family: Sparassidae
- Genus: Palystes
- Species: P. perornatus

Binomial name
- Palystes perornatus Pocock, 1900

= Palystes perornatus =

Eastern Cape's rain spider

Species of spider

Palystes perornatus is a spider species in the family Sparassidae. It is endemic to South Africa and is commonly known as Eastern Cape's rain spider.

== Distribution ==
Palystes perornatus is found in the Eastern Cape, KwaZulu-Natal, and Western Cape provinces. The species is protected in three reserves including Tsolwana Nature Reserve, Vernon Crookes Nature Reserve, and Swartberg Nature Reserve. Notable locations include Hogsback, Queenstown, and Port Edward. The species occurs at altitudes ranging from 63 to 1,754 m.

== Habitat and ecology ==
Palystes perornatus has been sampled from the Forest, Indian Ocean Coastal Belt, Grassland, Nama Karoo, and Savanna biomes. Some specimens have also been sampled from houses.

== Conservation ==
Palystes perornatus is listed as Least Concern by the South African National Biodiversity Institute due to its wide geographical range. The species is protected in Swartberg Nature Reserve, Tsolwana Nature Reserve, and Vernon Crookes Nature Reserve.

== Taxonomy ==
Palystes perornatus was originally described in 1900 from Queenstown in the Eastern Cape. The species was revised by Peter M. C. Croeser in 1996.
