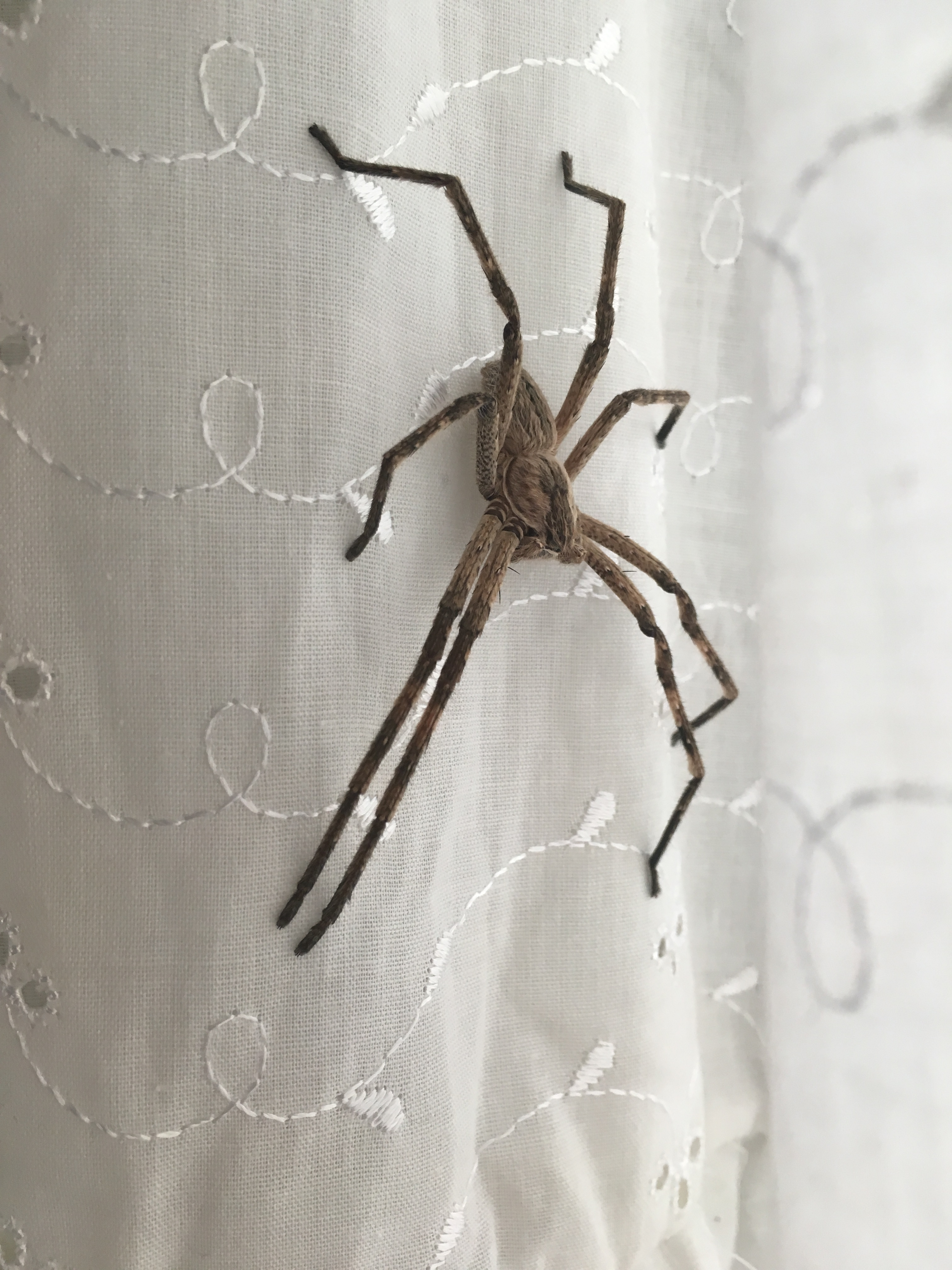

Scientific classification
- Kingdom: Animalia
- Phylum: Arthropoda
- Subphylum: Chelicerata
- Class: Arachnida
- Order: Araneae
- Infraorder: Araneomorphae
- Family: Sparassidae
- Genus: Palystes
- Species: P. castaneus

Binomial name
- Palystes castaneus Latreille, 1819

Synonyms
- Thomisus castaneus Latreille, 1819; Olios castaneus Walckenaer, 1837; Olios fuscus Walckenaer, 1837; Ocypete melanogaster C. L. Koch, 1845; Ocypete nobilis C. L. Koch, 1845; Palystes frenatus L. Koch, 1875; Palystes chaperi Simon, 1880; Olios melanogaster Simon, 1880

= Palystes castaneus =

Species of spider

Palystes castaneus is a species of huntsman spider found in parts of South Africa. It is common from Cape Town to Heidelberg, Western Cape, especially in forested areas. In scrub outside forested areas, it is replaced by Palystes superciliosus. It occurs mainly on plants, where it hunts insects. It has a body length of 17–22 mm. P. castaneus is the type species for the genus Palystes, and was first described by Pierre André Latreille in 1819.

== Distribution ==
Palystes castaneus is recorded from Mozambique, Zimbabwe, and South Africa.

In South Africa, the species is known from the Western Cape province, where it is protected in seven protected areas including De Hoop Nature Reserve and Table Mountain National Park. Notable locations include Cape Town, Hermanus, Stellenbosch, and Swellendam.

== Life style ==
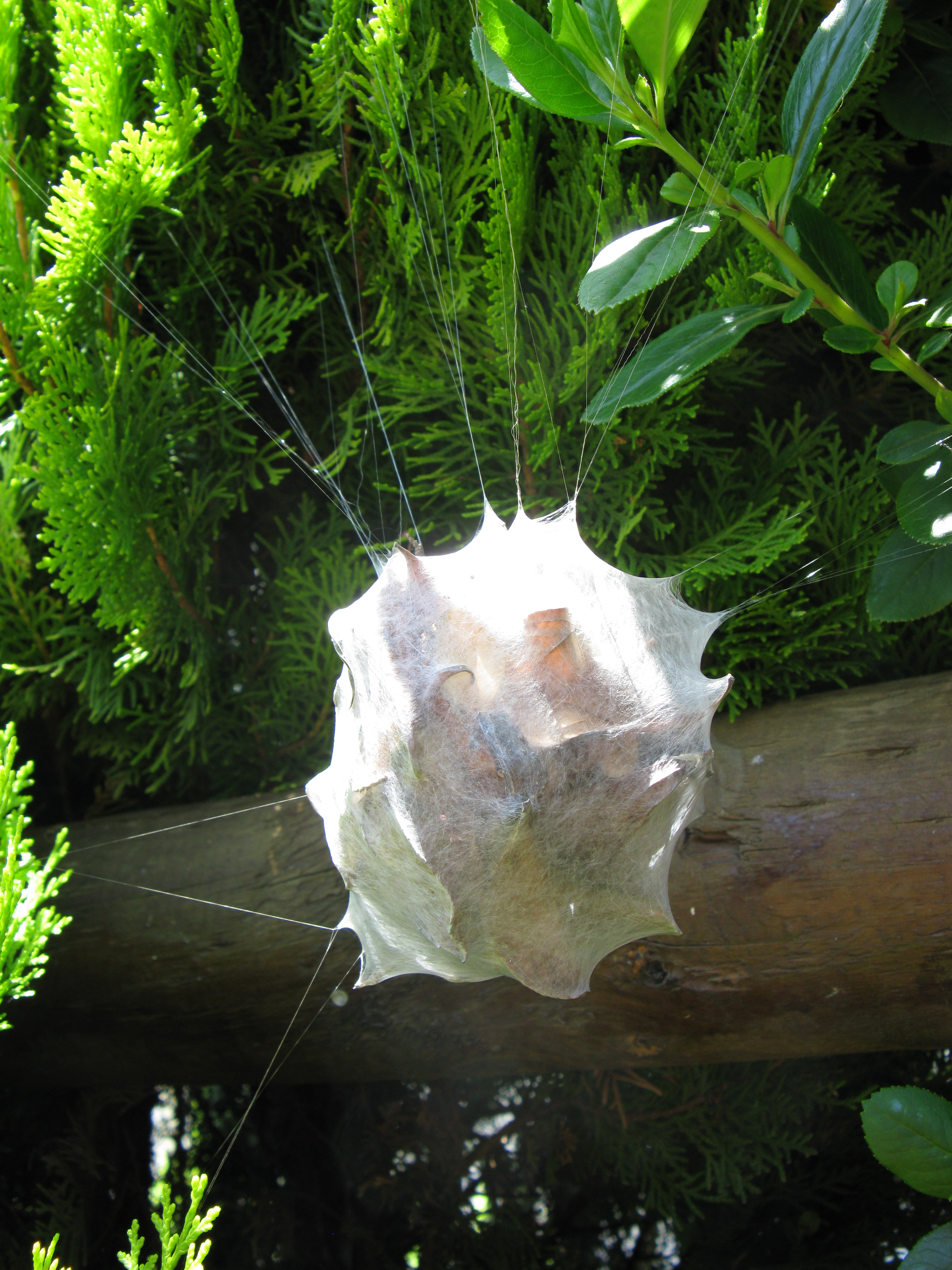
P. castaneus egg sac

Palystes castaneus is a forest and humid fynbos species. In the Western Cape it is found in the eastern Cape Peninsula forest and in similar areas to Grootvadersbos and De Hoop Nature Reserves. The species occurs at altitudes ranging from 4 to 1,517 m.

Spiders in the genus Palystes are commonly called rain spiders, or lizard-eating spiders. P. castaneus often appears in the home just before the onset of rain, where they hunt geckos (usually Afrogecko porphyreus). Males are regularly seen from August to December, probably looking for females.

After mating in the early summer, the female constructs a round egg sac about 60–100 mm in size made of silk, with twigs and leaves woven into it. These egg sacs are commonly seen from about November to April. The female constructs the sac over 3–5 hours, then aggressively guards it until the spiderlings, who hatch inside the protective sac, chew their way out about three weeks later. Many gardeners are bitten by protective Palystes mothers during this period. Females will construct about three of these egg sacs over their two-year lives.

== Description ==
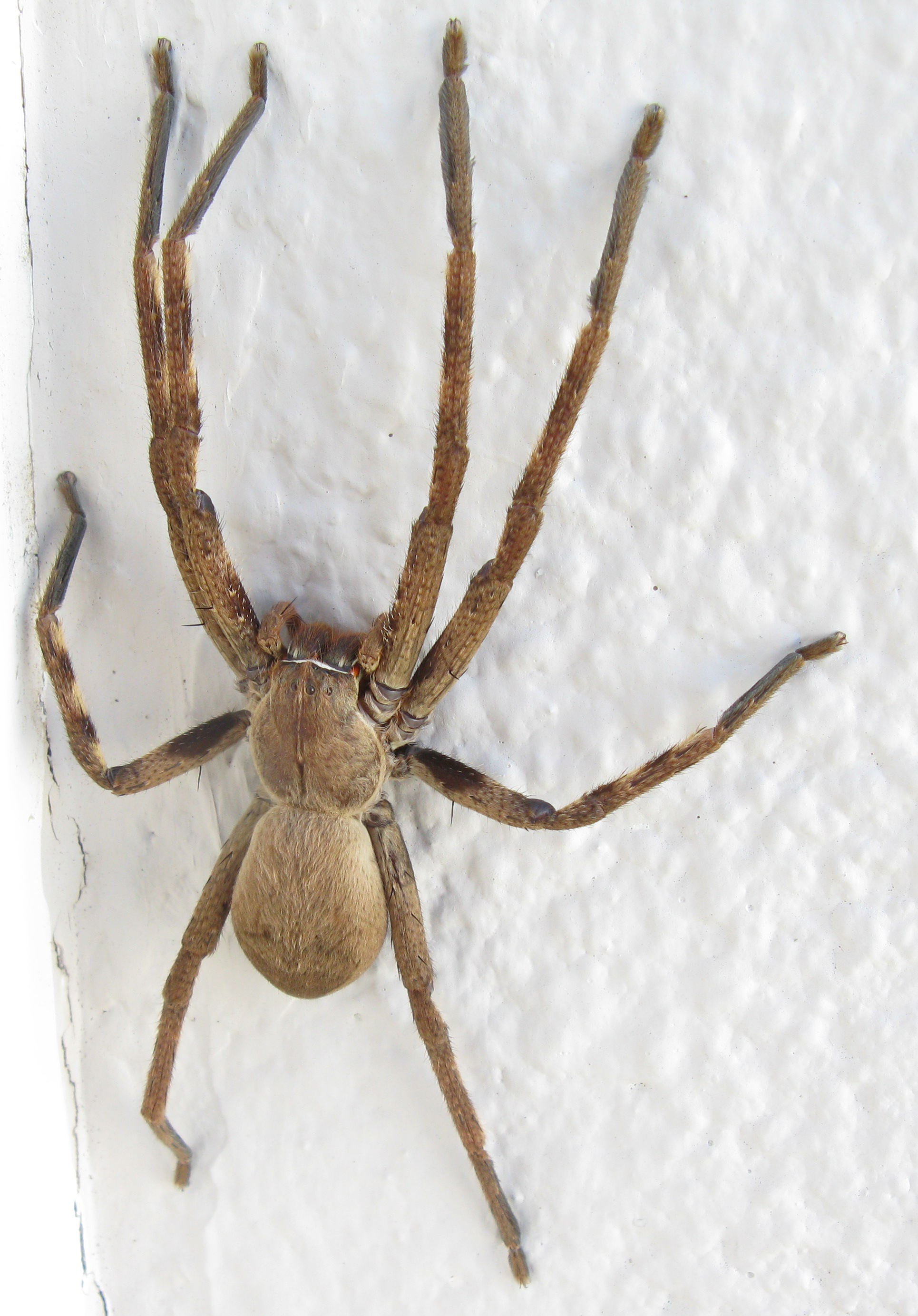

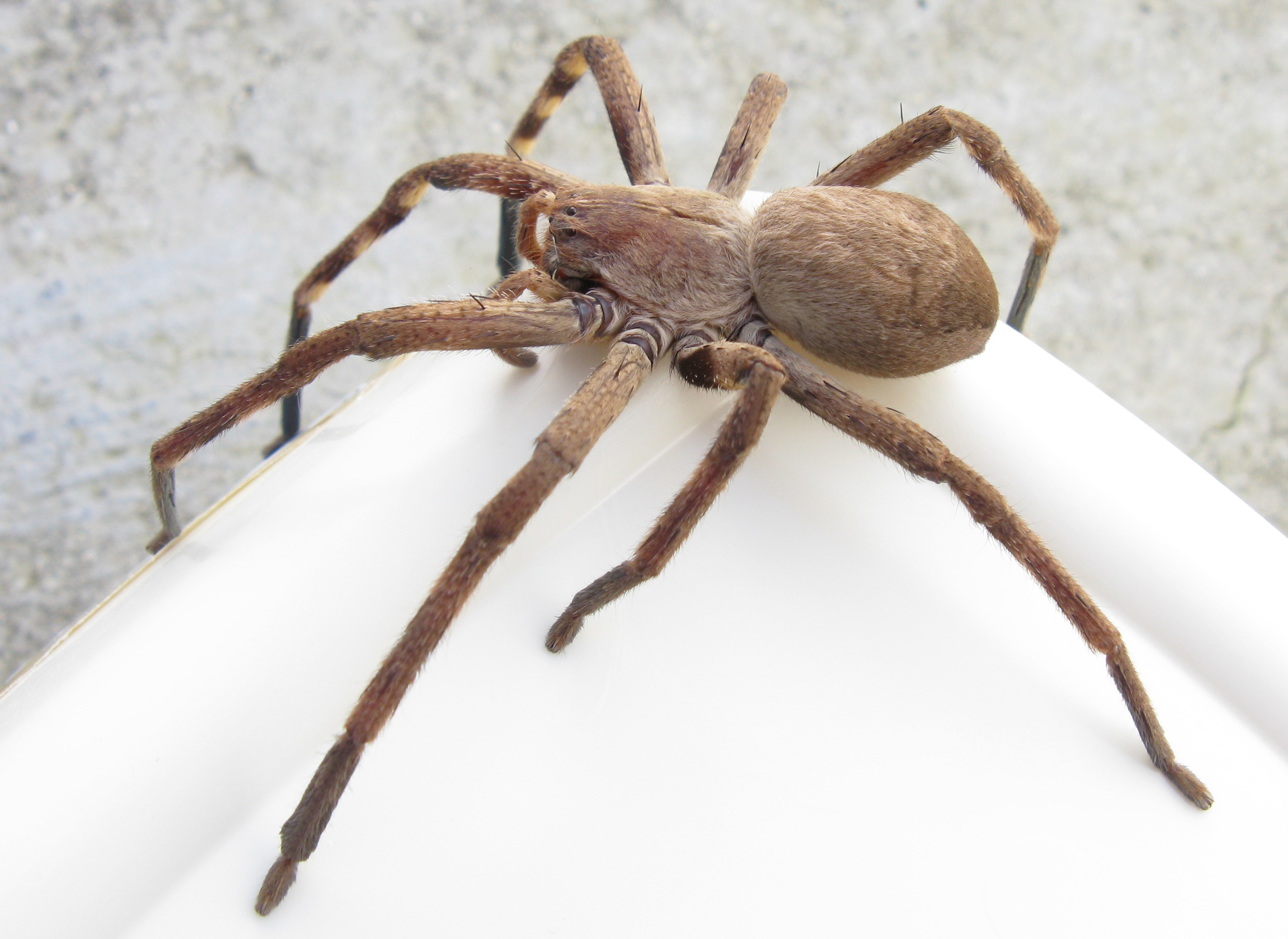
Female P. castaneus

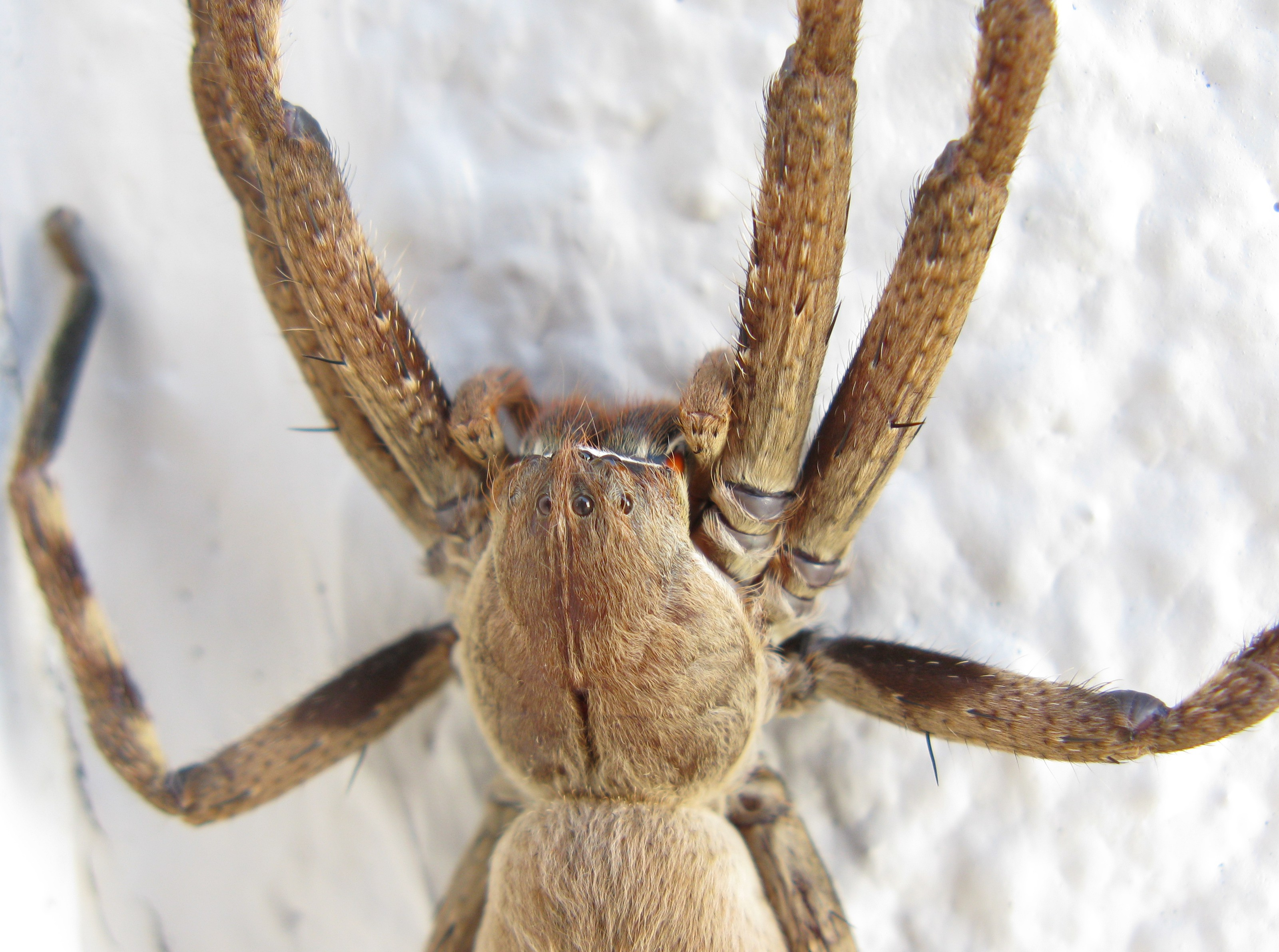

== Wasps ==
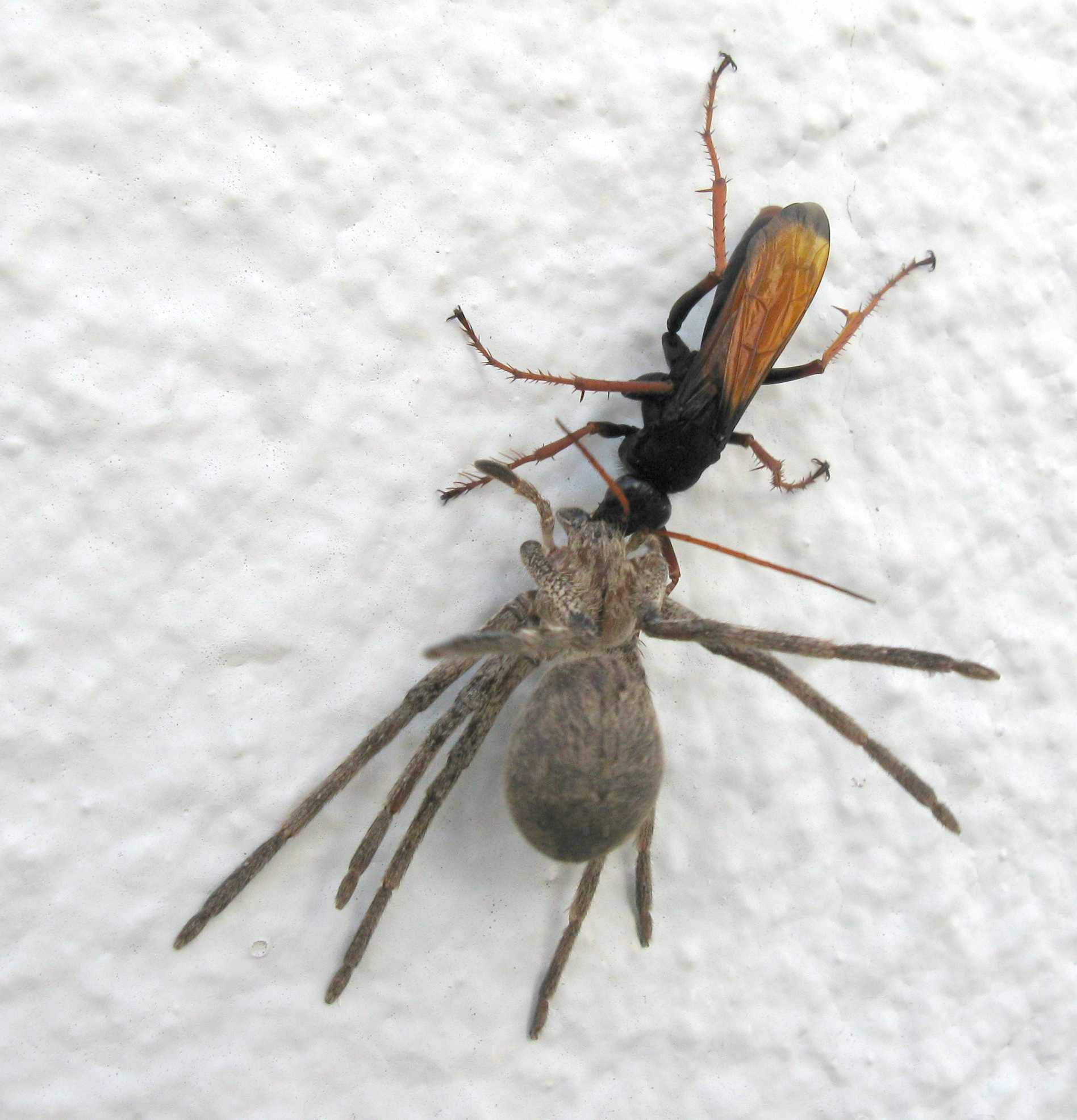
Tachypompilus ignitus dragging Palystes prey (not P. castaneus) up a wall

P. castaneus (and other Palystes spiders) are also commonly seen paralysed, being dragged by a large wasp called a Pompilid wasp. Sometimes the wasp will not be present. Pompilid wasps only hunt spiders, which they paralyse by stinging them. They then drag the spider back to their nest where they lay an egg on the spider, then seal the spider and the egg in. When the egg hatches, the larva eats the paralysed spider, keeping the spider alive as long as possible by eating peripheral flesh first, and saving the vital organs till last. By doing this, the spider stays fresh long enough for the wasp larva to mature and pupate. The Pompilid wasp species Tachypompilus ignitus is at least largely a specialist hunter of mature Palystes females.

== Conservation ==
Palystes castaneus is listed as Least Concern by the South African National Biodiversity Institute due to its wide geographical range.
