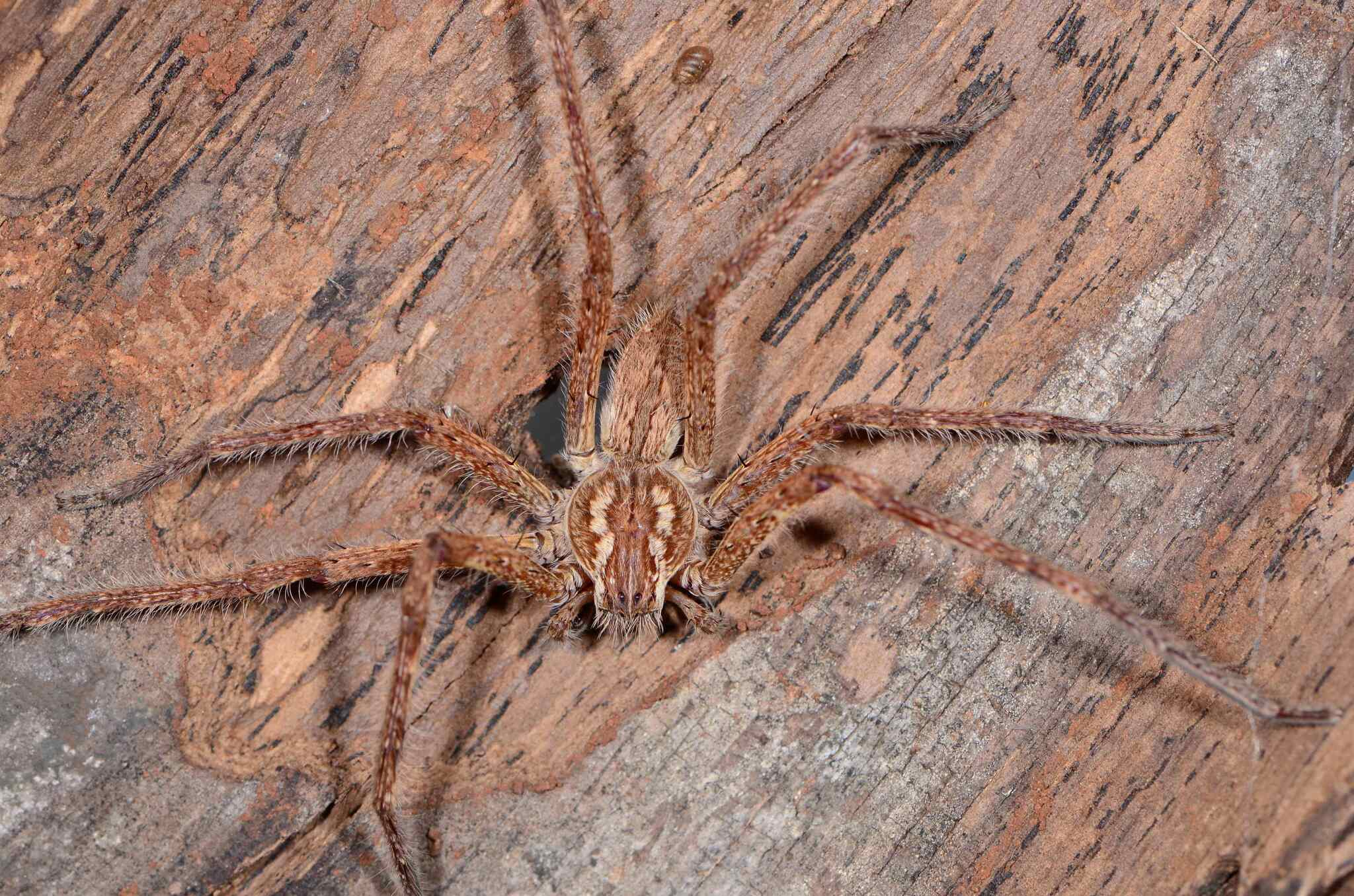
- male
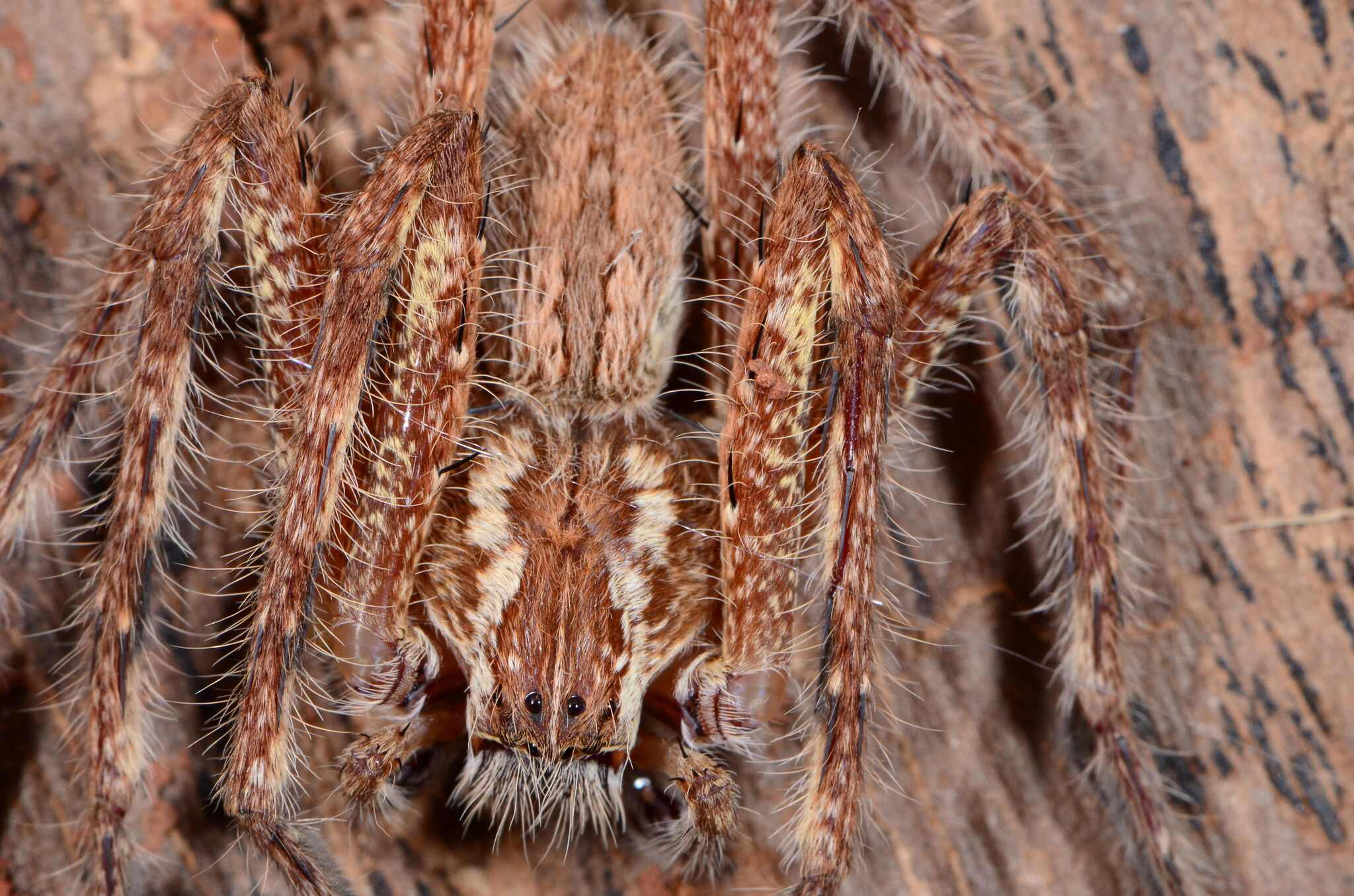
- male

Scientific classification
- Kingdom: Animalia
- Phylum: Arthropoda
- Subphylum: Chelicerata
- Class: Arachnida
- Order: Araneae
- Infraorder: Araneomorphae
- Family: Sparassidae
- Genus: Palystes
- Species: P. leroyorum

Binomial name
- Palystes leroyorum Croeser, 1996

= Palystes leroyorum =

Leroy's rain spider

Species of spider

Palystes leroyorum is a spider species in the family Sparassidae. It is endemic to South Africa and is commonly known as Leroy's rain spider.

== Distribution ==
Palystes leroyorum is found in the Free State, Gauteng, and Limpopo provinces. The species has been recorded from Bloemfontein, Johannesburg, Walter Sisulu National Botanical Garden, and several nature reserves including Lhuvhondo Nature Reserve and Lekgalameetse Nature Reserve. It occurs at altitudes ranging from 687 to 1,762 m.

== Habitat and ecology ==
Palystes leroyorum is a nocturnal hunter. During the day, it is inactive and shelters in vegetation. Some specimens in Bloemfontein were sampled from houses. The species has been sampled from the Grassland and Savanna biomes.

== Description ==
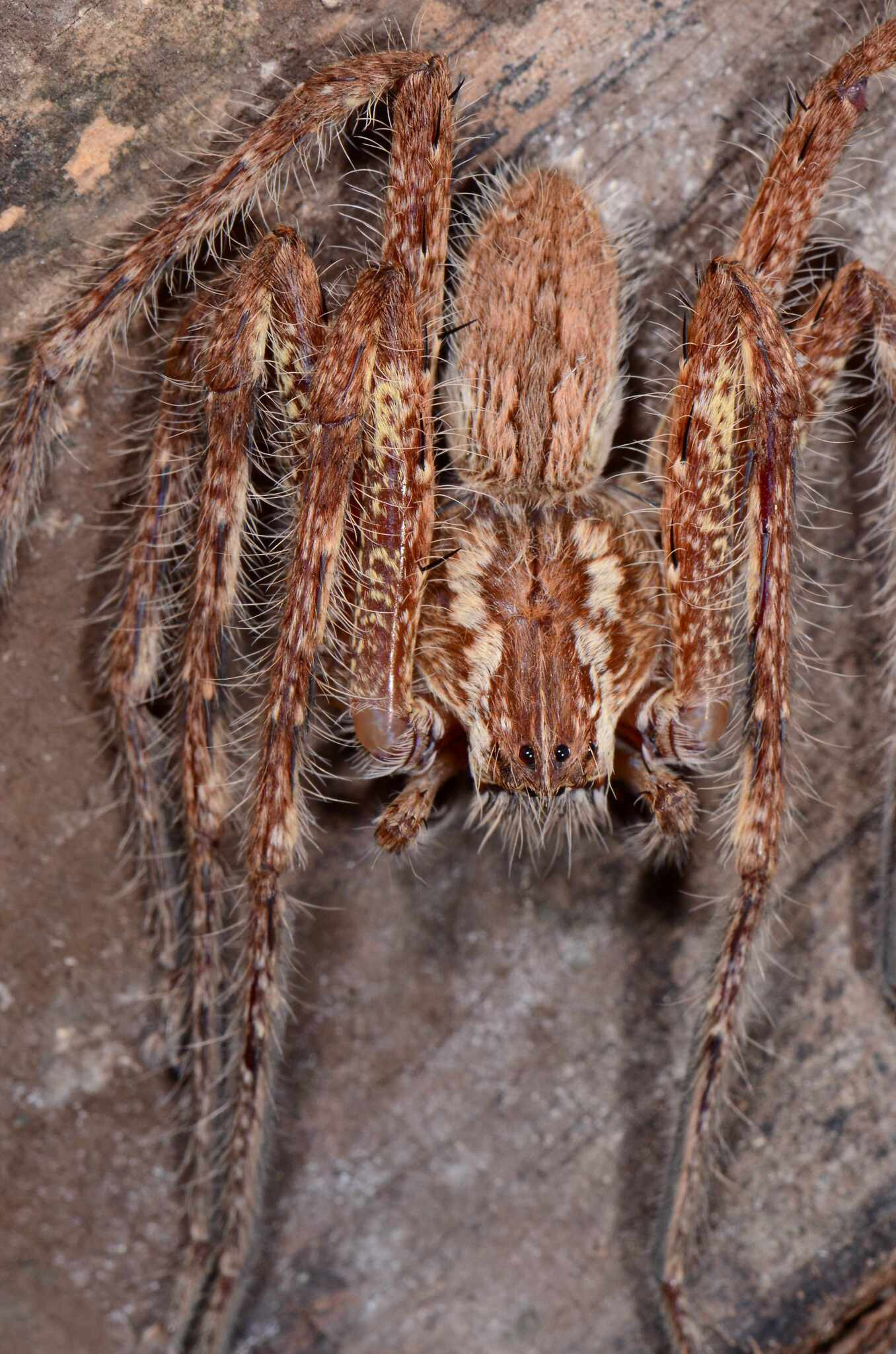
male

== Conservation ==
Palystes leroyorum is listed as Least Concern by the South African National Biodiversity Institute. Although the species is presently known only from one sex, it has a wide geographical range.

== Taxonomy ==
Only the male is known. A female has been collected and is housed in the National Museum in Bloemfontein but remains undescribed.
