= Palystes leppanae =

East Cape rain spider

Scientific classification
- Kingdom: Animalia
- Phylum: Arthropoda
- Subphylum: Chelicerata
- Class: Arachnida
- Order: Araneae
- Infraorder: Araneomorphae
- Family: Sparassidae
- Genus: Palystes
- Species: P. leppanae

Binomial name
- Palystes leppanae Pocock, 1902

Species of spider

Palystes leppanae is a spider species in the family Sparassidae. It is endemic to South Africa and is commonly known as the East Cape rain spider.

== Distribution ==
Palystes leppanae is found in the Eastern Cape and Western Cape provinces. The species has been recorded from Alicedale, Grahamstown, Middelburg, Jeffreys Bay, and Fernkloof Nature Reserve. It occurs at altitudes ranging from 28 to 1,287 m.

== Habitat and ecology ==
Palystes leppanae has been sampled from the Fynbos and Thicket biomes. In Grahamstown it was also found in buildings.

== Conservation ==
Palystes leppanae is listed as Least Concern by the South African National Biodiversity Institute due to its wide geographic range. The species is protected in Fernkloof Nature Reserve.

== Taxonomy ==
Palystes leppanae was originally described by Pocock in 1902 from Grahamstown. The species was revised by Croeser in 1996.
