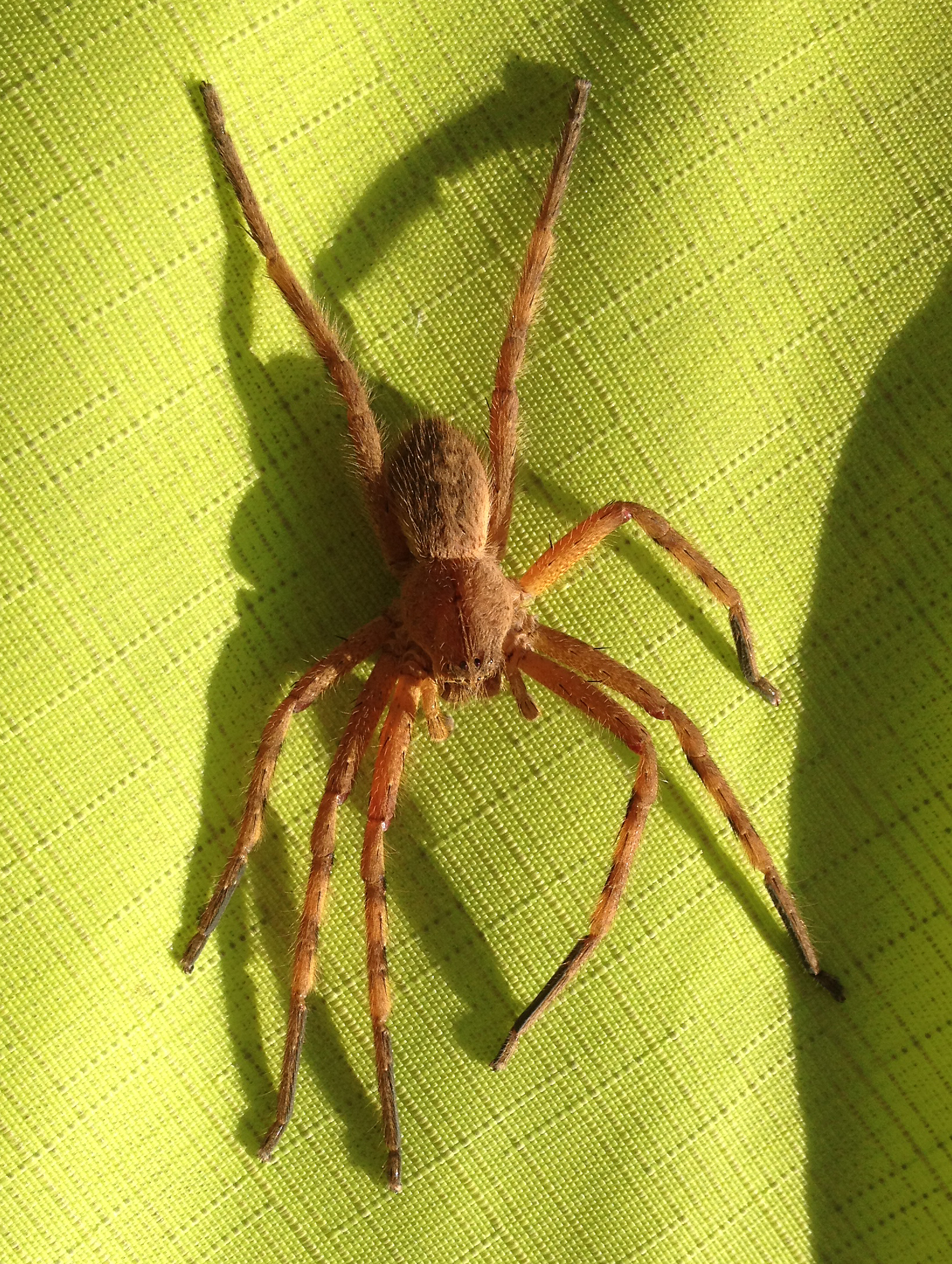

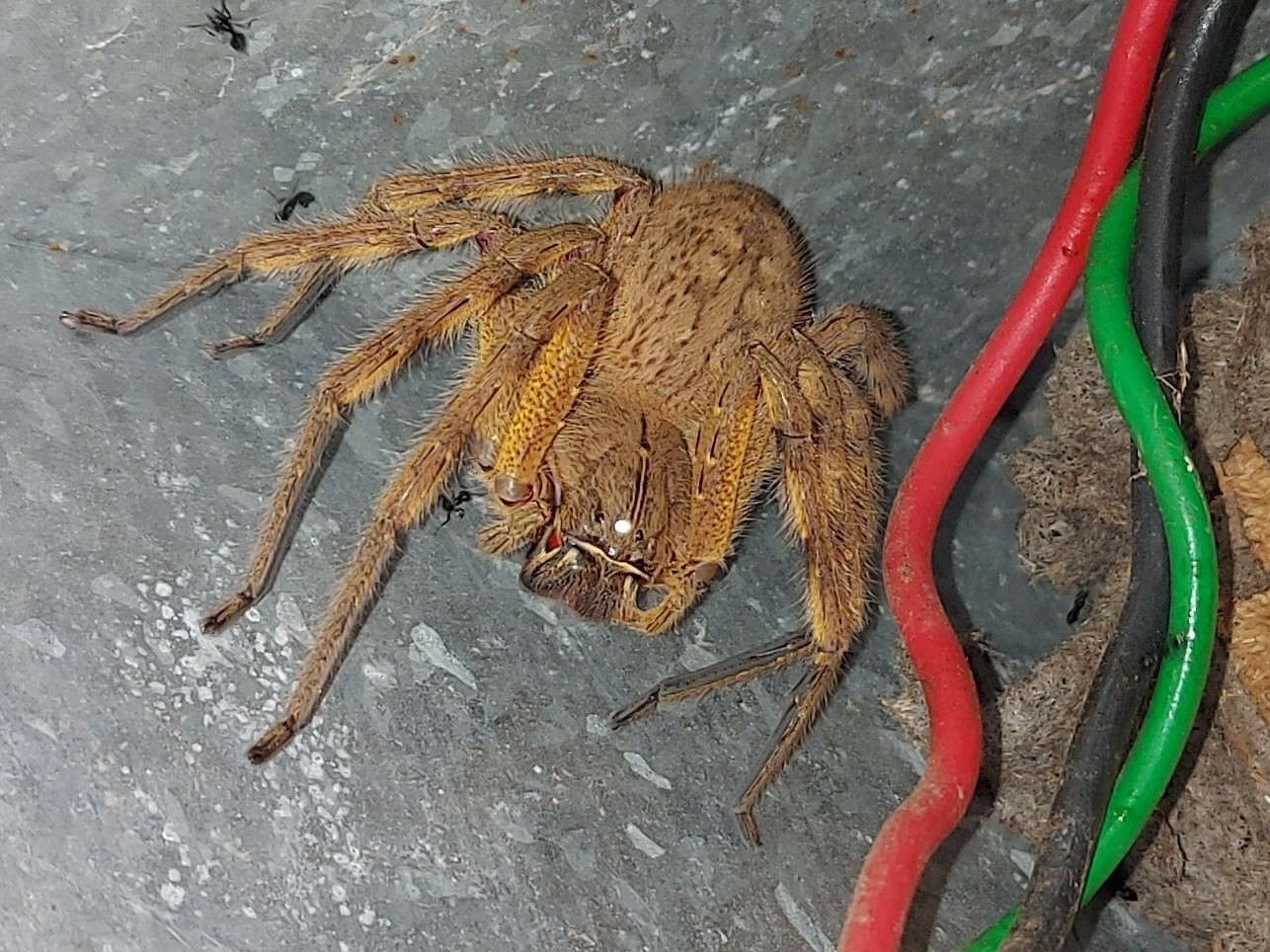

Scientific classification
- Kingdom: Animalia
- Phylum: Arthropoda
- Subphylum: Chelicerata
- Class: Arachnida
- Order: Araneae
- Infraorder: Araneomorphae
- Family: Sparassidae
- Genus: Palystes
- Species: P. martinfilmeri

Binomial name
- Palystes martinfilmeri Croeser, 1996

= Palystes martinfilmeri =

Cederberg rain spider

Species of spider

Palystes martinfilmeri is a spider species in the family Sparassidae. It is endemic to South Africa and is commonly known as the Cederberg rain spider.

== Distribution ==
Palystes martinfilmeri is found in the Western Cape province. The species seems to be restricted to the Cederberg Wilderness Area, with records from Dwars Rivier, Kromrivier, Sneeukop, and Clanwilliam. It occurs at altitudes ranging from 78 to 1,241 m.

== Habitat and ecology ==
Palystes martinfilmeri is a nocturnal plant hunting spider. The species has been sampled from the Fynbos Biome.

== Description ==
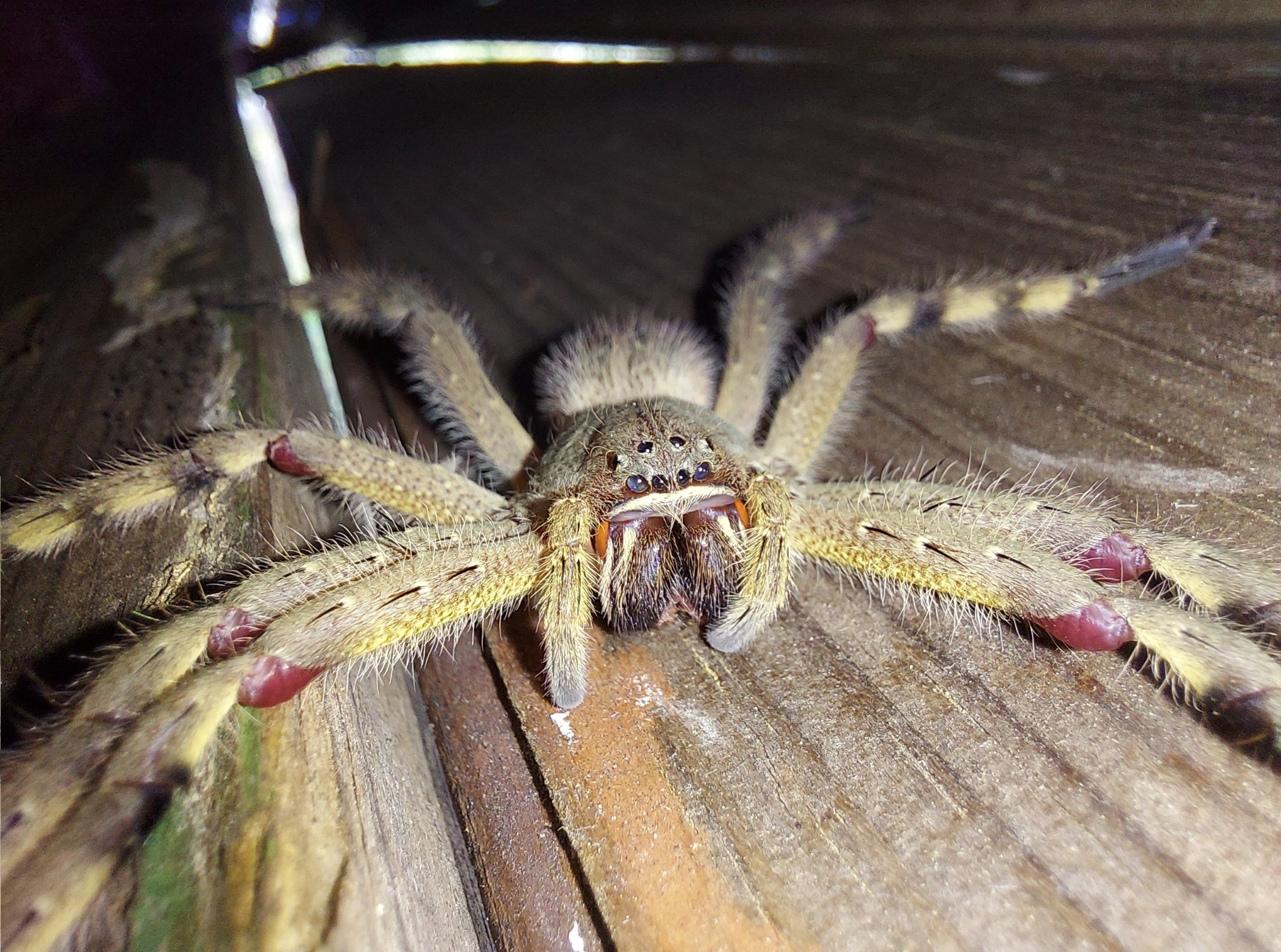

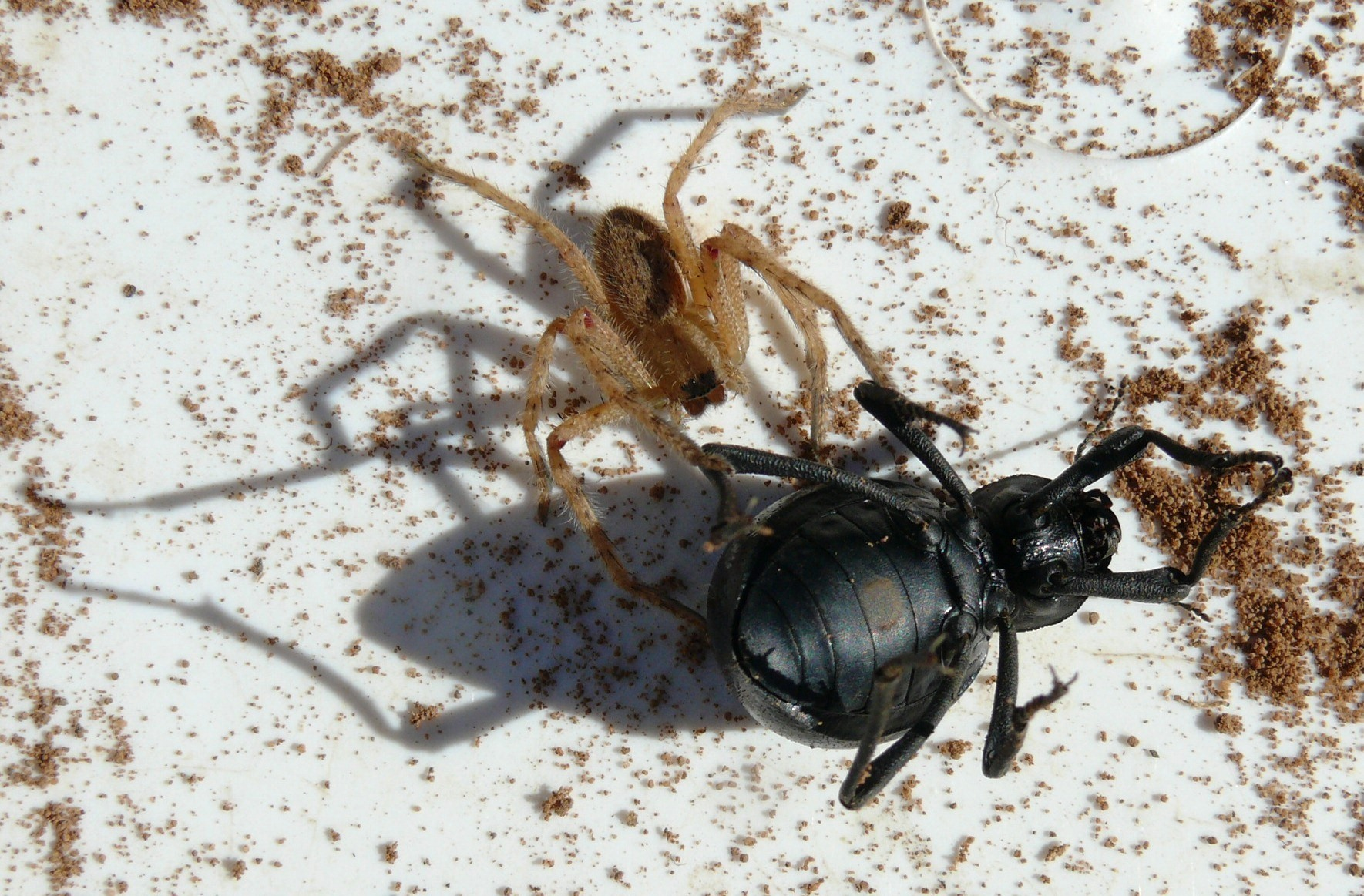

== Etymology ==
The species is named after arachnologist and naturalist Martin Filmer.

== Conservation ==
Palystes martinfilmeri is listed as Rare by the South African National Biodiversity Institute. Due to the species having a small restricted distribution range and occurring predominantly within a protected area, it is listed as Rare. The species is protected in the Cederberg Wilderness Area.
