= Palystes ansiedippenaarae =

Jessievale rain spider

Scientific classification
- Kingdom: Animalia
- Phylum: Arthropoda
- Subphylum: Chelicerata
- Class: Arachnida
- Order: Araneae
- Infraorder: Araneomorphae
- Family: Sparassidae
- Genus: Palystes
- Species: P. ansiedippenaarae

Binomial name
- Palystes ansiedippenaarae Croeser, 1996

Species of spider

Palystes ansiedippenaarae is a spider species in the family Sparassidae. It is endemic to South Africa and is commonly known as the Jessievale rain spider.

== Distribution ==
Palystes ansiedippenaarae is found in KwaZulu-Natal and Mpumalanga provinces. It has been sampled from Jessievale in Mpumalanga and Ndumo Game Reserve in KwaZulu-Natal.

== Habitat and ecology ==
The species is a nocturnal hunting spider. During the day, adults are inactive and shelter on vegetation.

Palystes ansiedippenaarae has been sampled under dry, thin bark of Pinus trees in commercial pine plantations. It occurs in the Forest, Grassland, and Savanna biomes at altitudes ranging from 47 to 1,725 m.

== Etymology ==
The species is named after South African arachnologist Ansie Dippenaar-Schoeman.

== Conservation ==
Palystes ansiedippenaarae is listed as Least Concern by the South African National Biodiversity Institute. The species occurs in two provinces including two protected areas. As this species is able to survive in forestry plantations, a main land use within its range, it is considered Least Concern.
