= Palystes crawshayi =

Lesotho rain spider

Scientific classification
- Kingdom: Animalia
- Phylum: Arthropoda
- Subphylum: Chelicerata
- Class: Arachnida
- Order: Araneae
- Infraorder: Araneomorphae
- Family: Sparassidae
- Genus: Palystes
- Species: P. crawshayi

Binomial name
- Palystes crawshayi Pocock, 1902

Species of spider

Palystes crawshayi is a spider species in the family Sparassidae. It is found in southern Africa and is commonly known as the Lesotho rain spider.

== Distribution ==
Palystes crawshayi is recorded from Lesotho and South Africa.

In South Africa, it is known from the Free State, where it has been sampled from Zastron and Bloemfontein. The species occurs at altitudes ranging from 1,375 to 1,841 m.

== Habitat and ecology ==
Palystes crawshayi is a nocturnal plant dweller. During the day, adults are inactive and shelter on vegetation. The species has also been sampled from buildings in Bloemfontein. A specimen from Zastron was sampled hiding in a rotten log in the Grassland Biome.

== Conservation ==
Palystes crawshayi is listed as Least Concern by the South African National Biodiversity Institute. Much natural habitat remains within this species' range, and it is suspected to be under-sampled.

== Taxonomy ==
Palystes crawshayi was originally described by Pocock in 1902 from Lesotho. The species was revised by Croeser in 1996.
