= Palystella namaquensis =

Namaqua palystella huntsman spider

Scientific classification
- Kingdom: Animalia
- Phylum: Arthropoda
- Subphylum: Chelicerata
- Class: Arachnida
- Order: Araneae
- Infraorder: Araneomorphae
- Family: Sparassidae
- Genus: Palystella
- Species: P. namaquensis

Binomial name
- Palystella namaquensis Lawrence, 1938

Species of spider

Palystella namaquensis is a spider species in the family Sparassidae. It is endemic to southern Africa and is commonly known as the Namaqua Palystella huntsman spider.

== Distribution ==
Palystella namaquensis has been recorded from Namibia and South Africa, where it is known only from Klipfontein in the Northern Cape.

== Habitat and ecology ==
Palystella namaquensis is a free-running ground dweller found in arid regions. It has been sampled from under rocks in the Nama Karoo Biome. The species occurs at altitudes of approximately 927 m.

== Conservation ==
Palystella namaquensis is listed as Data Deficient for taxonomic reasons by the South African National Biodiversity Institute. The species is known only from the type locality with a very restricted range. The male remains unknown, and additional sampling is needed to collect males and determine the full extent of the species' distribution.
