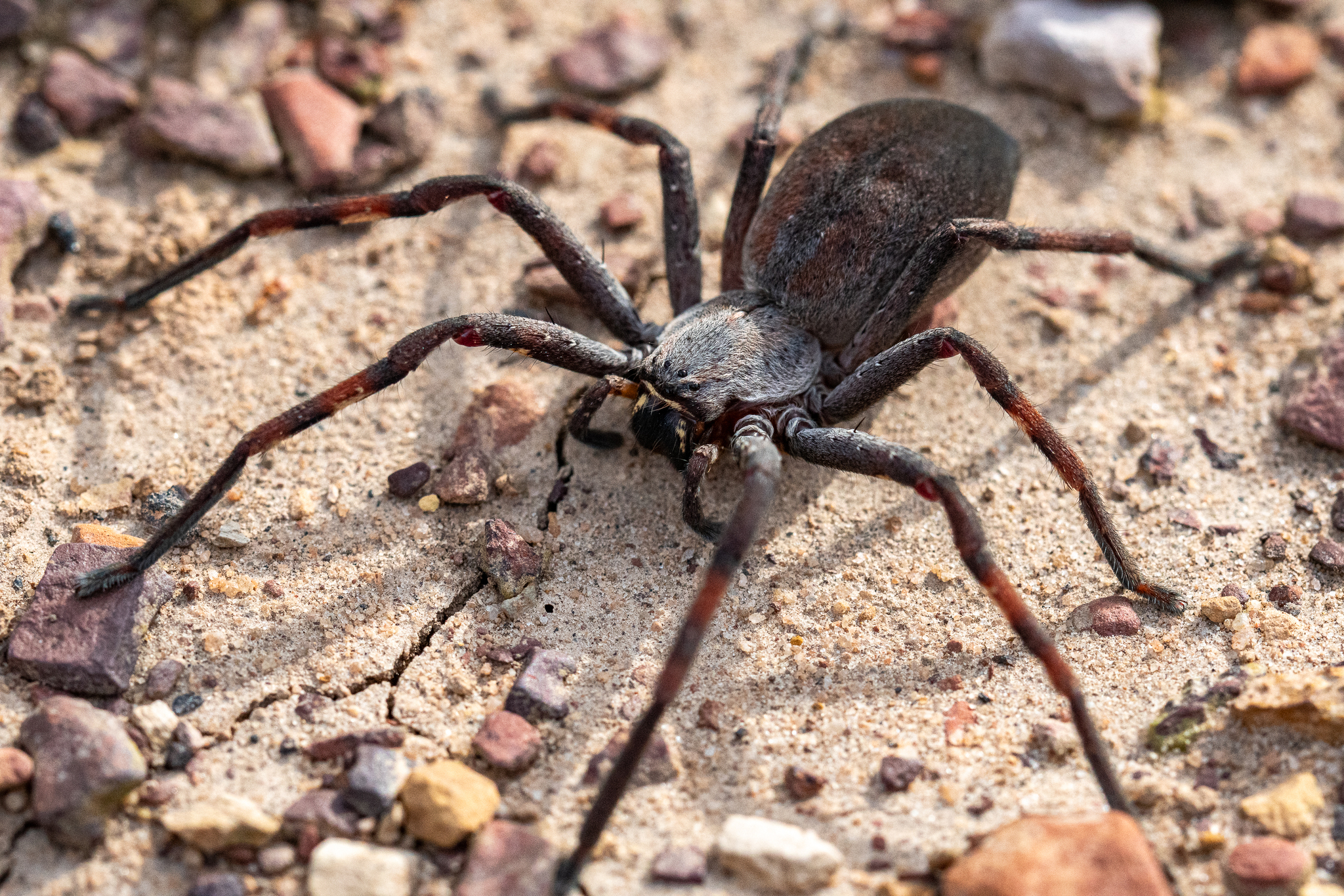

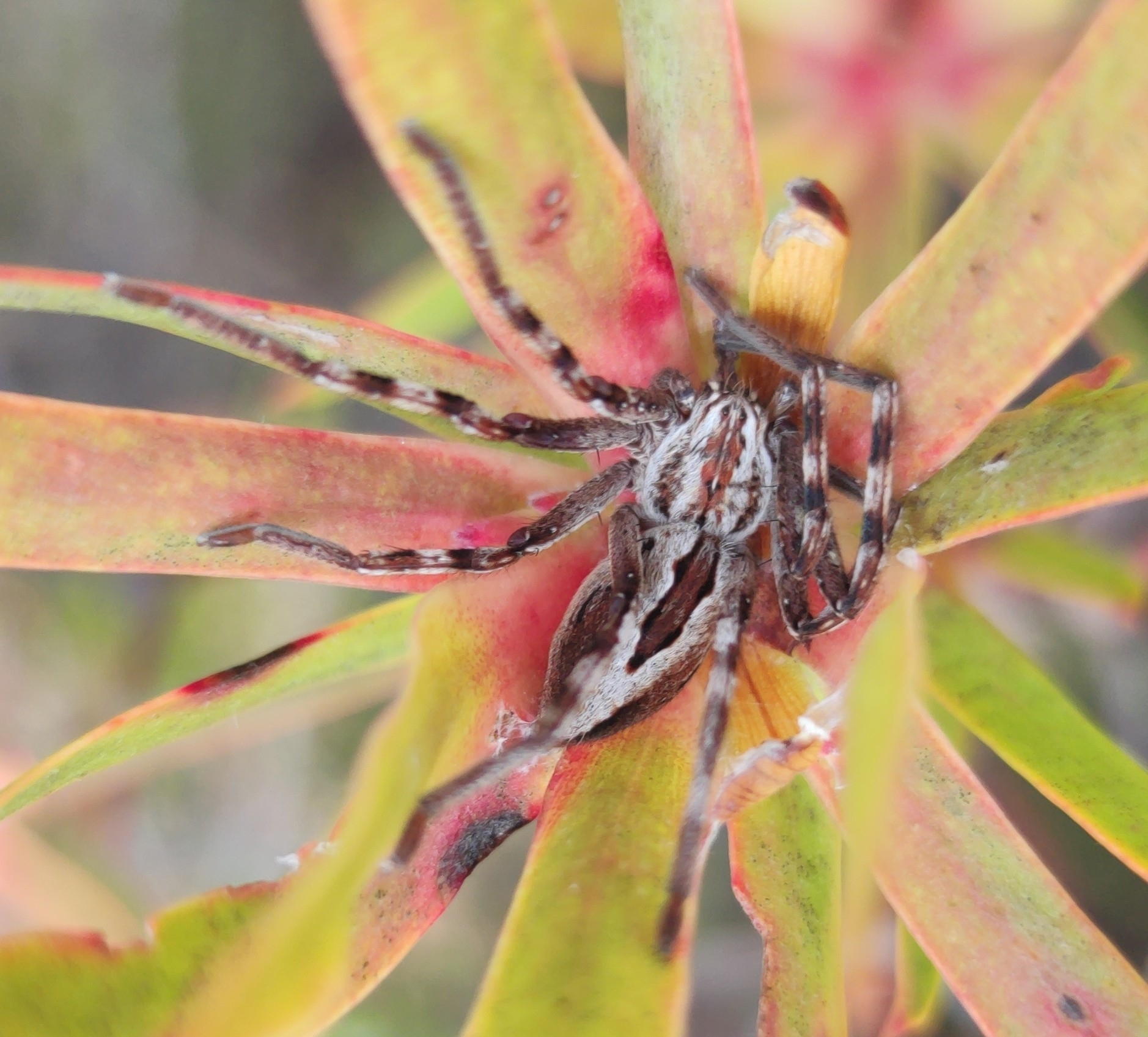

Scientific classification
- Kingdom: Animalia
- Phylum: Arthropoda
- Subphylum: Chelicerata
- Class: Arachnida
- Order: Araneae
- Infraorder: Araneomorphae
- Family: Sparassidae
- Genus: Palystes
- Species: P. kreutzmanni

Binomial name
- Palystes kreutzmanni Jäger & Kunz, 2010

Synonyms
- Palystes kreuzmanni Dippenaar-Schoeman et al., 2022

= Palystes kreutzmanni =

Kleinmond rain spider

Species of spider

Palystes kreutzmanni is a spider species in the family Sparassidae. It is endemic to South Africa and is commonly known as the Kleinmond rain spider or Kreutzmann's rain spider.

== Distribution ==
Palystes kreutzmanni is found in the Western Cape province. It has been recorded from Kleinmond, Pringle Bay, Du Toitskloof, Fernkloof Nature Reserve, and Kirstenbosch National Botanical Garden. The species occurs at altitudes ranging from 6 to 230 m.

== Habitat and ecology ==
Palystes kreutzmanni occurs in fynbos vegetation of the Western Cape region. The spiders build retreats between apical leaves of bushes such as Leucadendron and Asteraceae (Othonna quinqedentata) bushes. The egg sac is enclosed in the leaves.

== Conservation ==
Palystes kreutzmanni is listed as Endangered by the South African National Biodiversity Institute. The species is rare and presently known only from a small area in the Western Cape. It is protected in the Fernkloof Nature Reserve. Due to the species having a small restricted range, being known from only four locations, and experiencing ongoing decline in habitat availability due to coastal development and crop cultivation, it is listed as Endangered.
