= Palystes lunatus =

Murraysburg rain spider

Scientific classification
- Kingdom: Animalia
- Phylum: Arthropoda
- Subphylum: Chelicerata
- Class: Arachnida
- Order: Araneae
- Infraorder: Araneomorphae
- Family: Sparassidae
- Genus: Palystes
- Species: P. lunatus

Binomial name
- Palystes lunatus Pocock, 1896

Species of spider

Palystes lunatus is a spider species in the family Sparassidae. It is endemic to South Africa and is commonly known as the Murraysburg rain spider.

== Distribution ==
Palystes lunatus was originally described with the type specimen only labelled as South Africa. According to Croeser, the species may be restricted to a relatively small locality, probably somewhere in the montane interior of the Eastern Cape Province.

== Habitat and ecology ==
Nothing is known about the habitat or ecology of this species.

== Conservation ==
Palystes lunatus is listed as Data Deficient by the South African National Biodiversity Institute. The species is known only from a single unspecified site in South Africa. The status of the species remains obscure. Some more sampling is needed to collect the male and to determine the species' range.

== Taxonomy ==
Palystes lunatus was originally described by Pocock in 1896. The species was revised by Croeser in 1996, and is known from only the female.
