= Palystes stuarti =

Nieuwoudtville rain spider

Scientific classification
- Kingdom: Animalia
- Phylum: Arthropoda
- Subphylum: Chelicerata
- Class: Arachnida
- Order: Araneae
- Infraorder: Araneomorphae
- Family: Sparassidae
- Genus: Palystes
- Species: P. stuarti

Binomial name
- Palystes stuarti Croeser, 1996

Species of spider

Palystes stuarti is a spider species in the family Sparassidae. It is endemic to South Africa and is commonly known as the Nieuwoudtville rain spider.

== Distribution ==
Palystes stuarti is found in the Northern Cape and Western Cape provinces. The species has been recorded from Nieuwoudtville and Borrelfontein near Gouritz Mouth. It occurs at altitudes ranging from 4 to 699 m.

== Habitat and ecology ==
During the day, adults are inactive and shelter in vegetation. The type specimen was sampled in a house in the Fynbos Biome.

== Conservation ==
Palystes stuarti is listed as Data Deficient by the South African National Biodiversity Institute. The species is under-sampled as only one other specimen has been sampled from the Western Cape. The status of the species remains obscure, and additional sampling is needed to determine the species' range.
