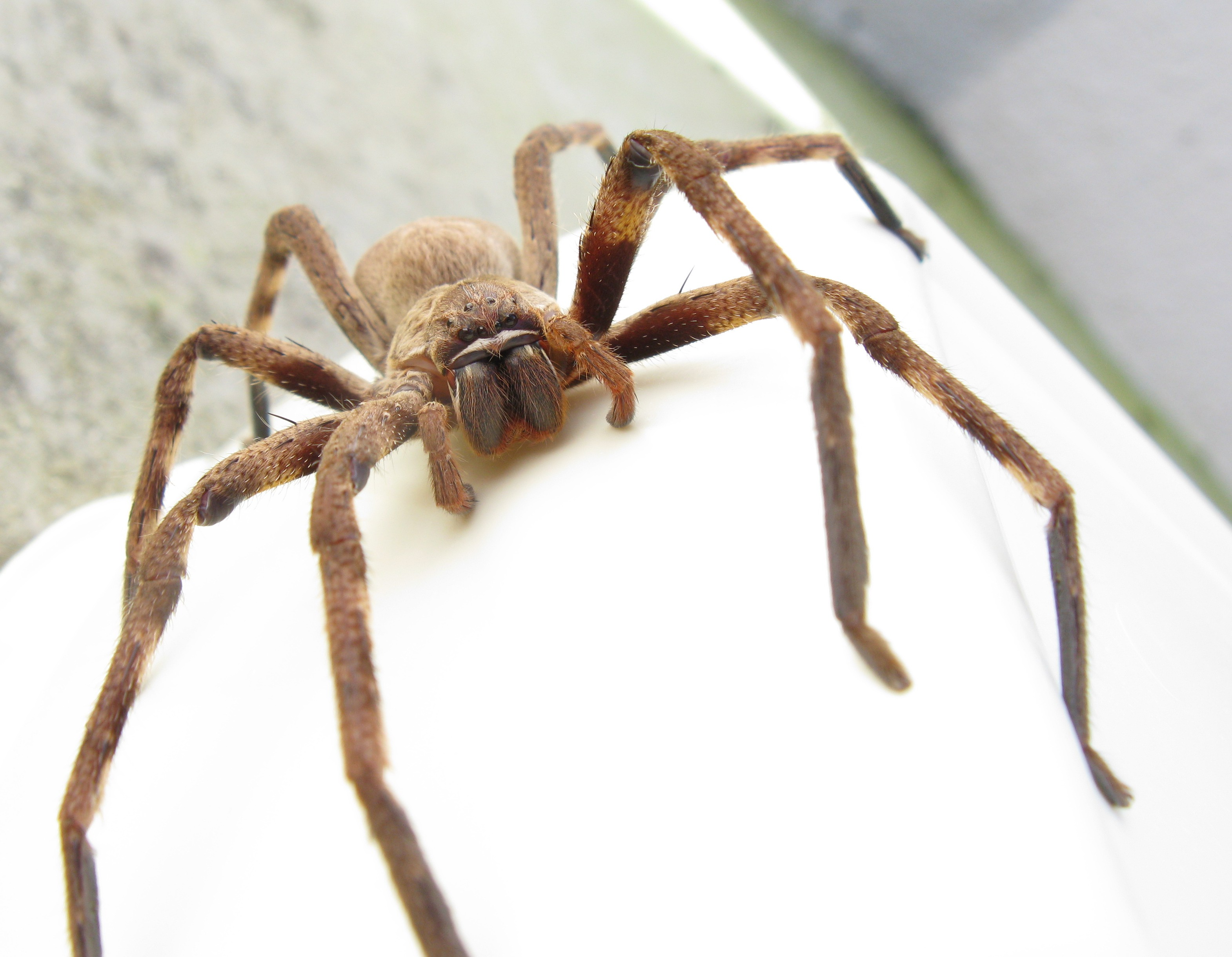
- Female Palystes castaneus near Somerset West, South Africa
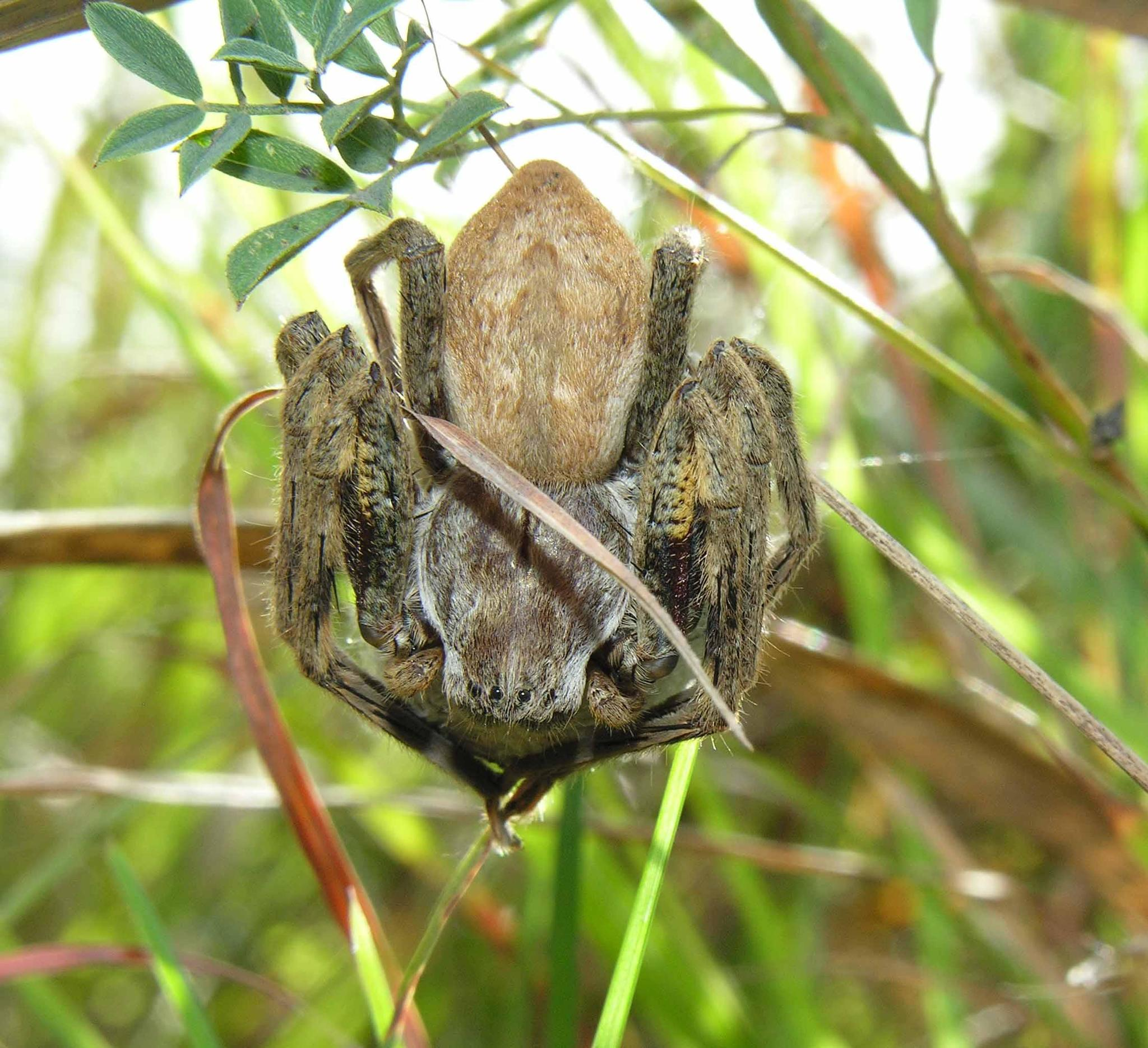
- Female P. perornatus

Scientific classification
- Kingdom: Animalia
- Phylum: Arthropoda
- Subphylum: Chelicerata
- Class: Arachnida
- Order: Araneae
- Infraorder: Araneomorphae
- Family: Sparassidae
- Genus: Palystes; L. Koch, 1875

Type species
- Palystes castaneus Latreille, 1819

Species
- See text

Diversity
- 20 species

= Palystes =

Genus of spiders

Palystes is a genus of huntsman spiders, commonly called rain spiders or lizard-eating spiders, occurring in Africa, India, Australia, and the Pacific. The most common and widespread species is P. superciliosus, found in South Africa, home to 12 species in the genus. The name Palystes is derived from either the Latin palaestes or the Greek palaistes, meaning "wrestler". The genus was first described by Ludwig Carl Christian Koch in 1875.

== Build ==
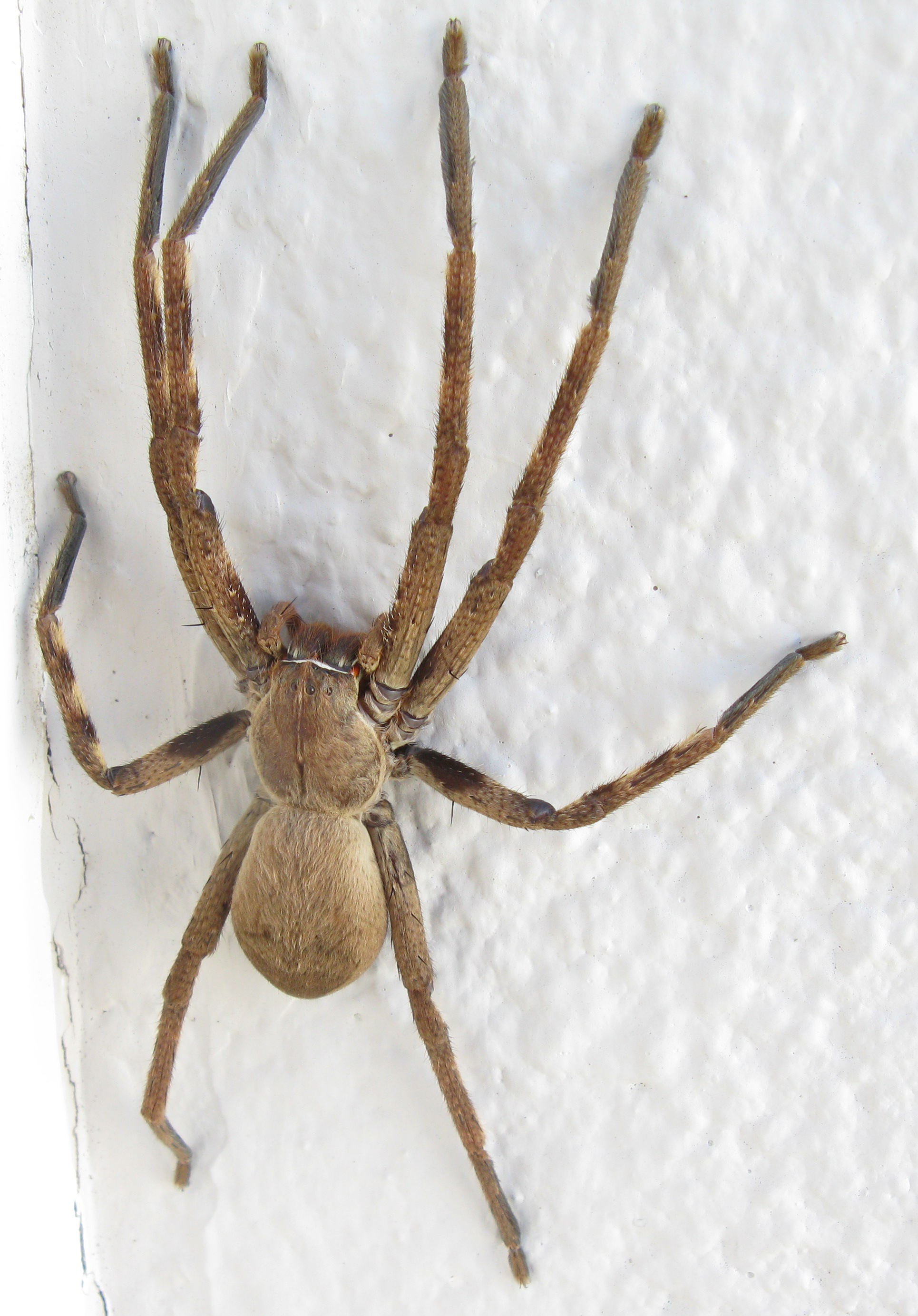

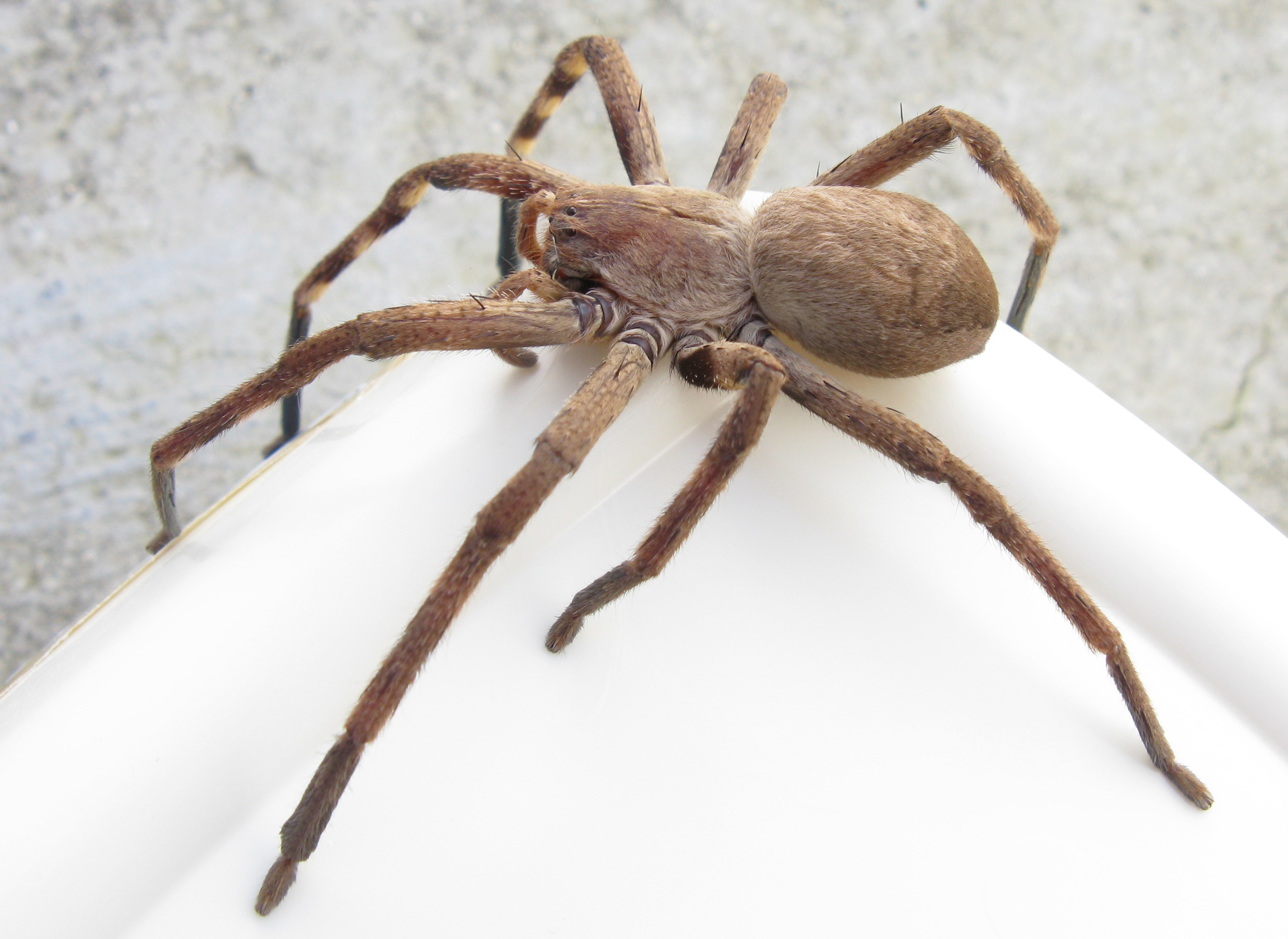
female P. castaneus

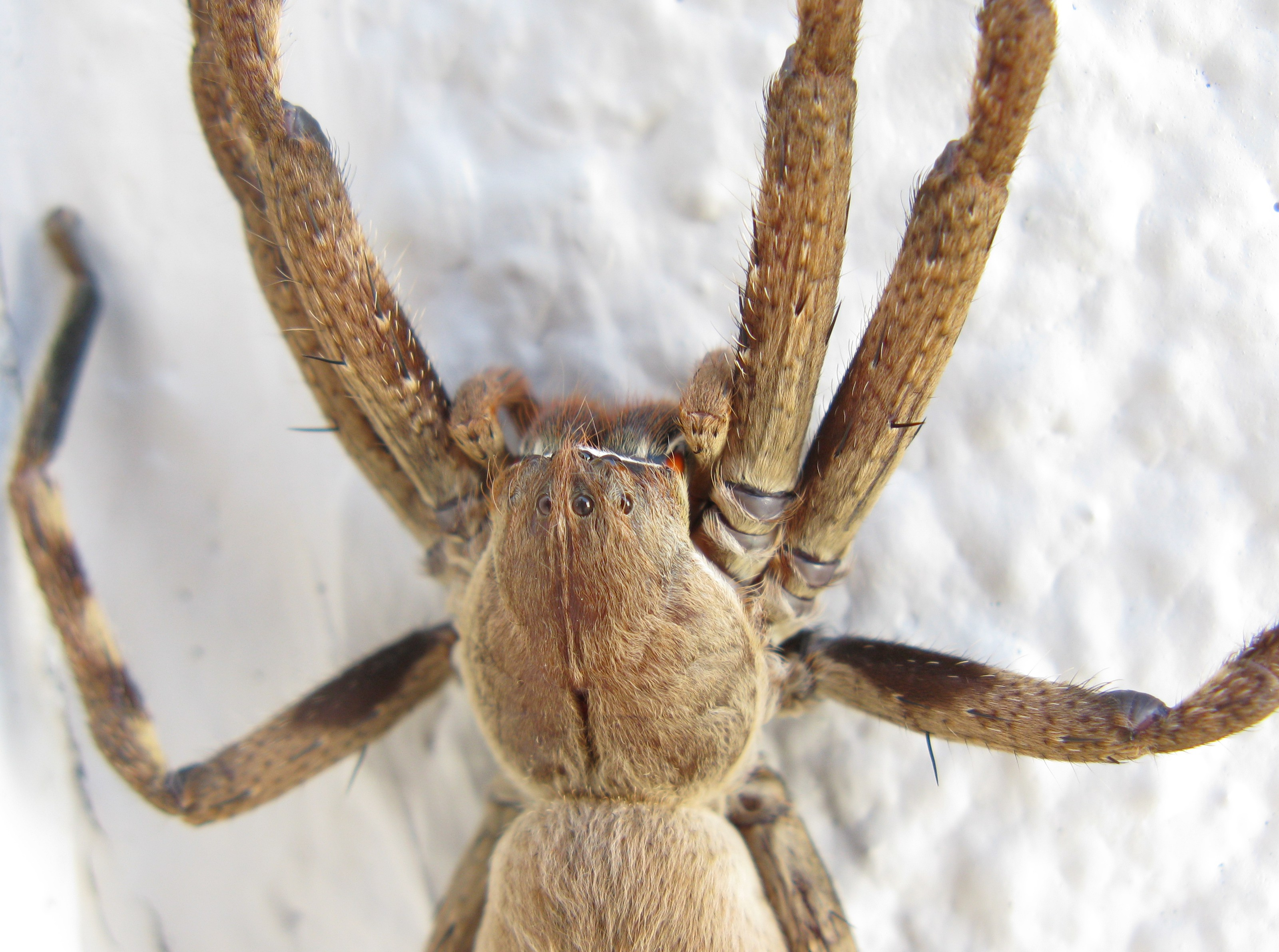

Palystes species are large spiders, with a body length of 15–36 mm, and a leg span up to 110 mm. Their top side is covered in tan to dark tan velvety setae (hairs). The underside of their legs is banded in colour, and their legs and abdomens may be interspersed with slightly longer setae. They have a large moustachial stripe below their front eyes, and extending down their fangs.

== Habits ==
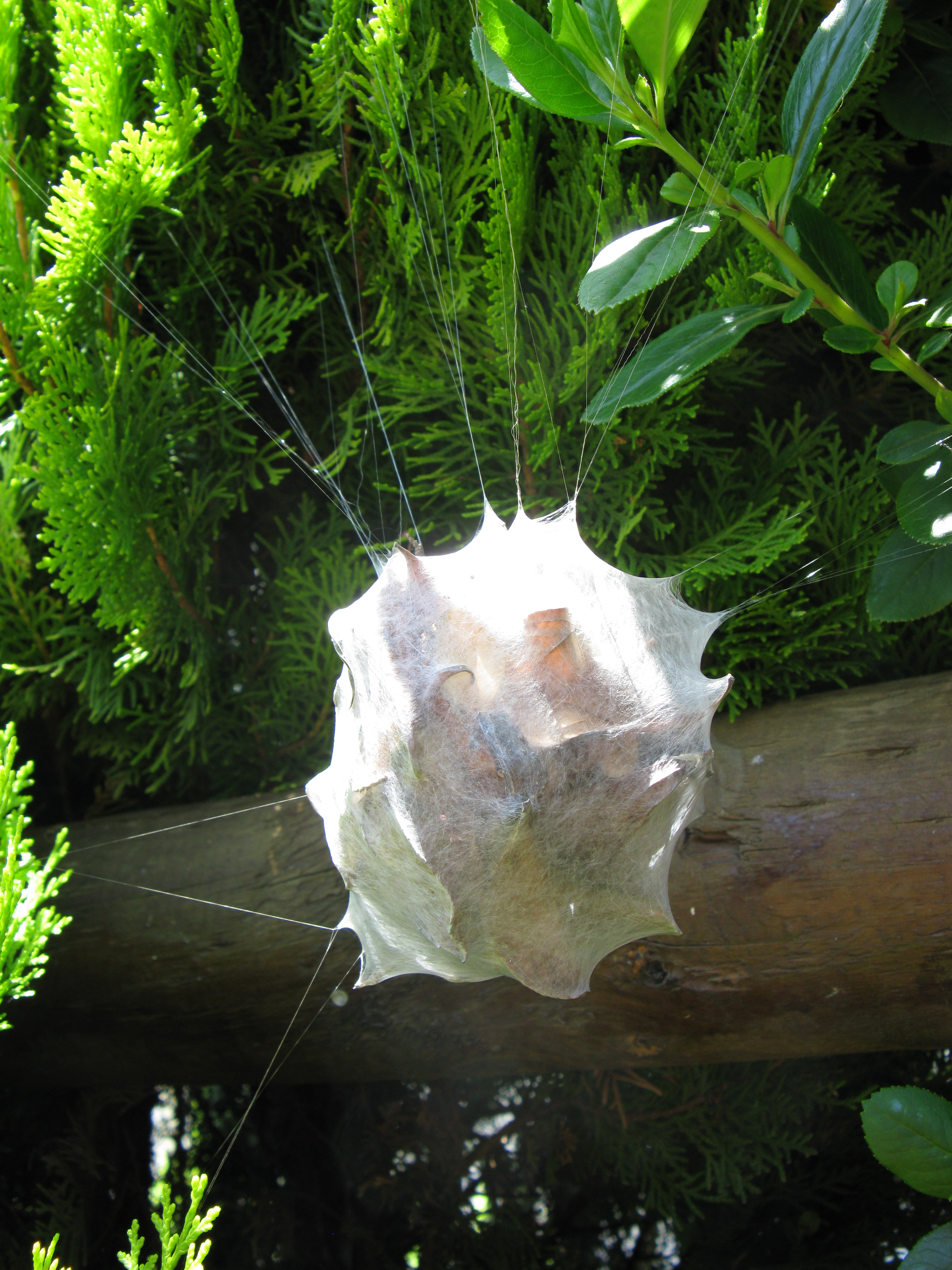
Egg sac of P. castaneus

While Palystes species mostly hunt insects on plants, they commonly enter houses before rain, or during the summer, where they prey on geckos (usually Afrogecko porphyreus in the Western Cape, or Lygodactylus capensis in the eastern parts of southern Africa). Males are regularly seen from August to December, probably looking for females.

The large, round egg sacs of P. castaneus and P. superciliosus are commonly seen from about November to April. After mating in the early summer, the female makes a 60- to 100-mm sac out of silk, with twigs and leaves woven into it. She constructs the sac over 3–5 hours, then aggressively guards it until the spiderlings, which hatch inside the protective sac, chew their way out about three weeks later. Females construct about three of these egg sacs over their two-year lives. Many gardeners are bitten by protective Palystes mothers during this period.

In the field, Palystes species are usually associated with canopy and open forest on moist, sea-ward aspects of inland mountains, wooded gorges and river valleys, or with low altitude forest and scrub on the coastal plains abutting the Indian Ocean. P. superciliosus also occurs in savannah woodland. They are night-active wandering hunters that retire into rock, plant or tree crevices, and under loose bark during the day, relying on immobility and cryptic colouring to escape detection. They are particularly easily collected in plantation pockets of pine trees in indigenous forest where they are found under the loose bark of felled logs or dead branches. Three species are commonly encountered in suburban gardens and homes in the higher rainfall areas of southern Africa. Their egg sacs and the protection by the female differ between species.

== Venom ==
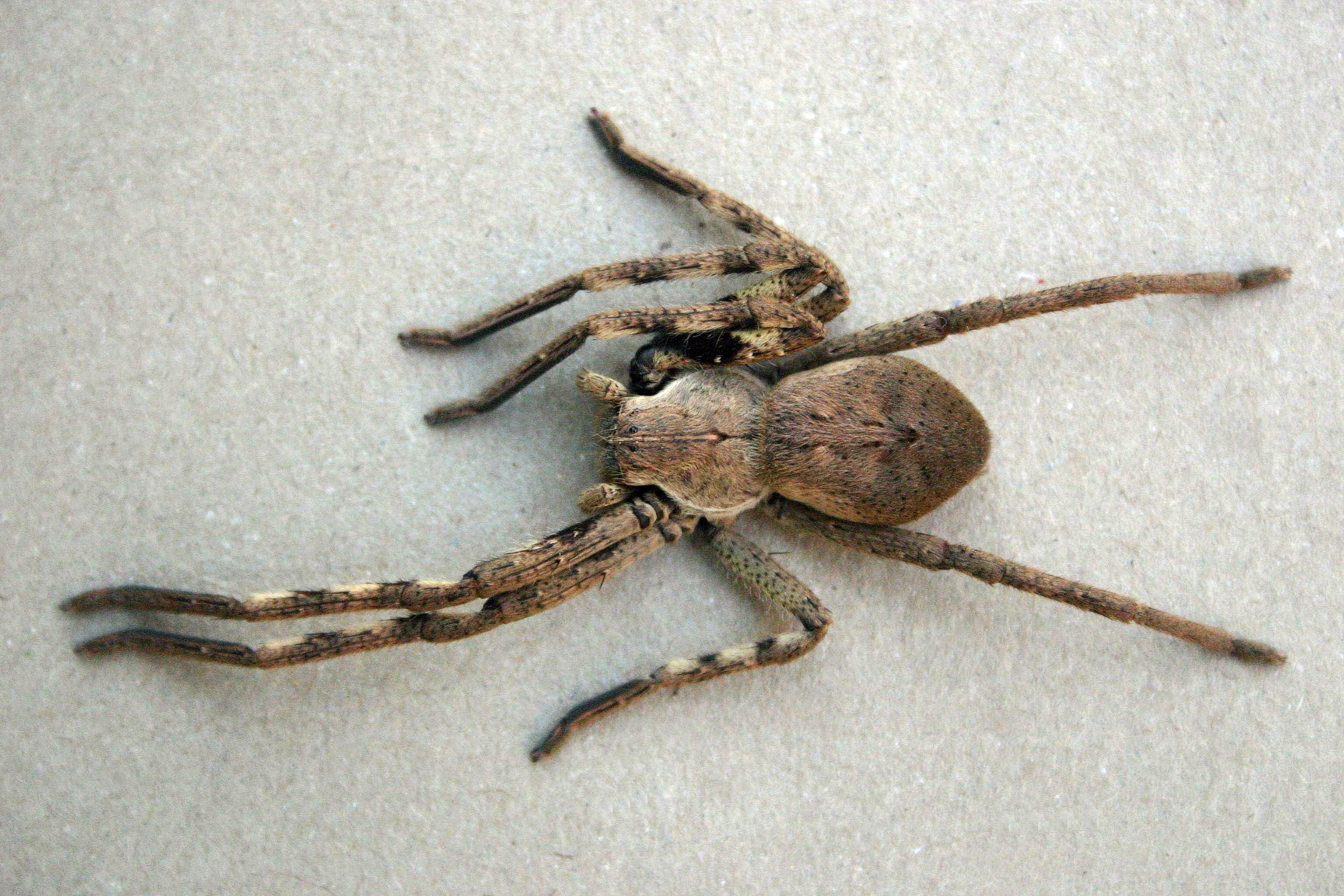
Female P. superciliosus

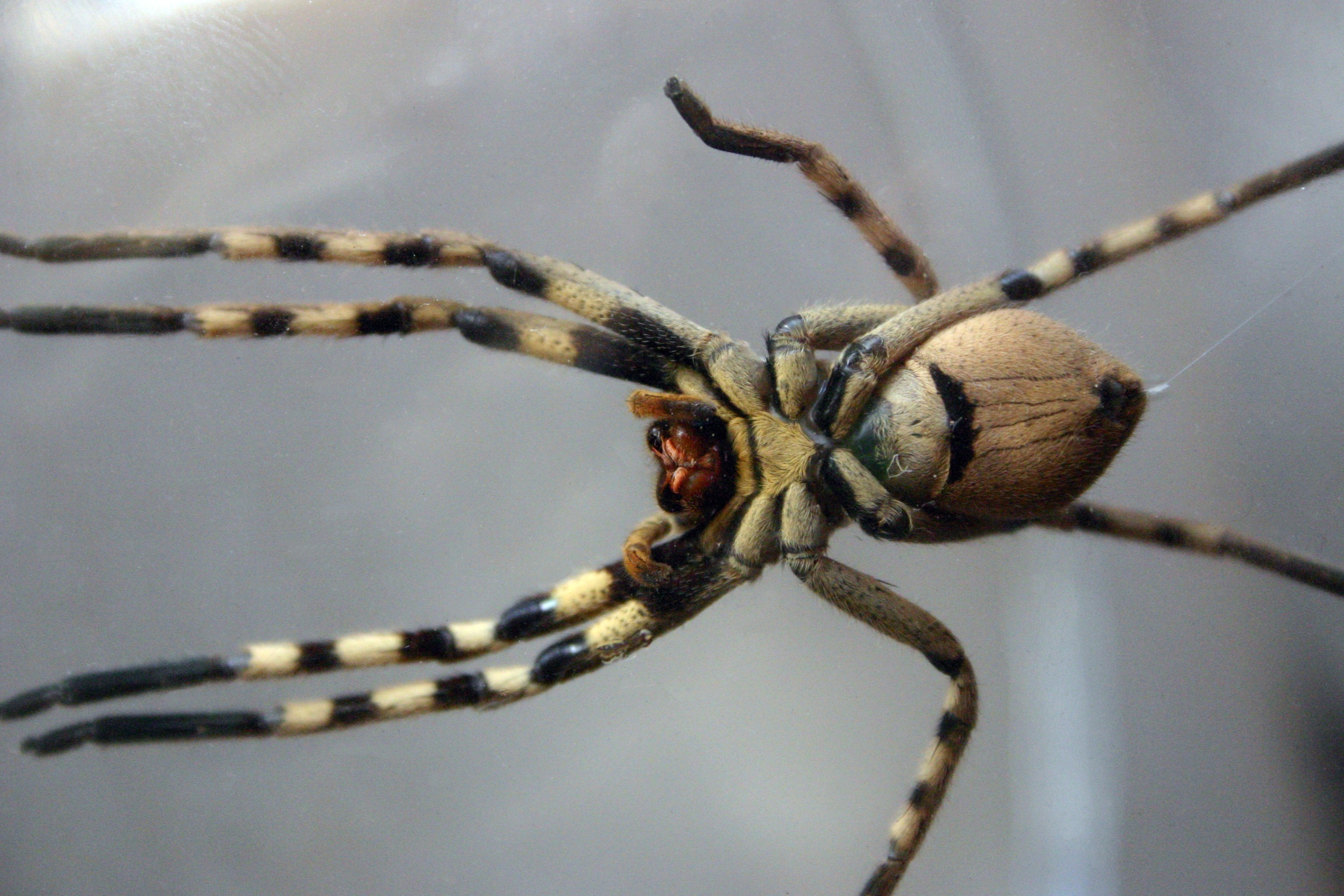
Underside of female P. superciliosus, showing banding

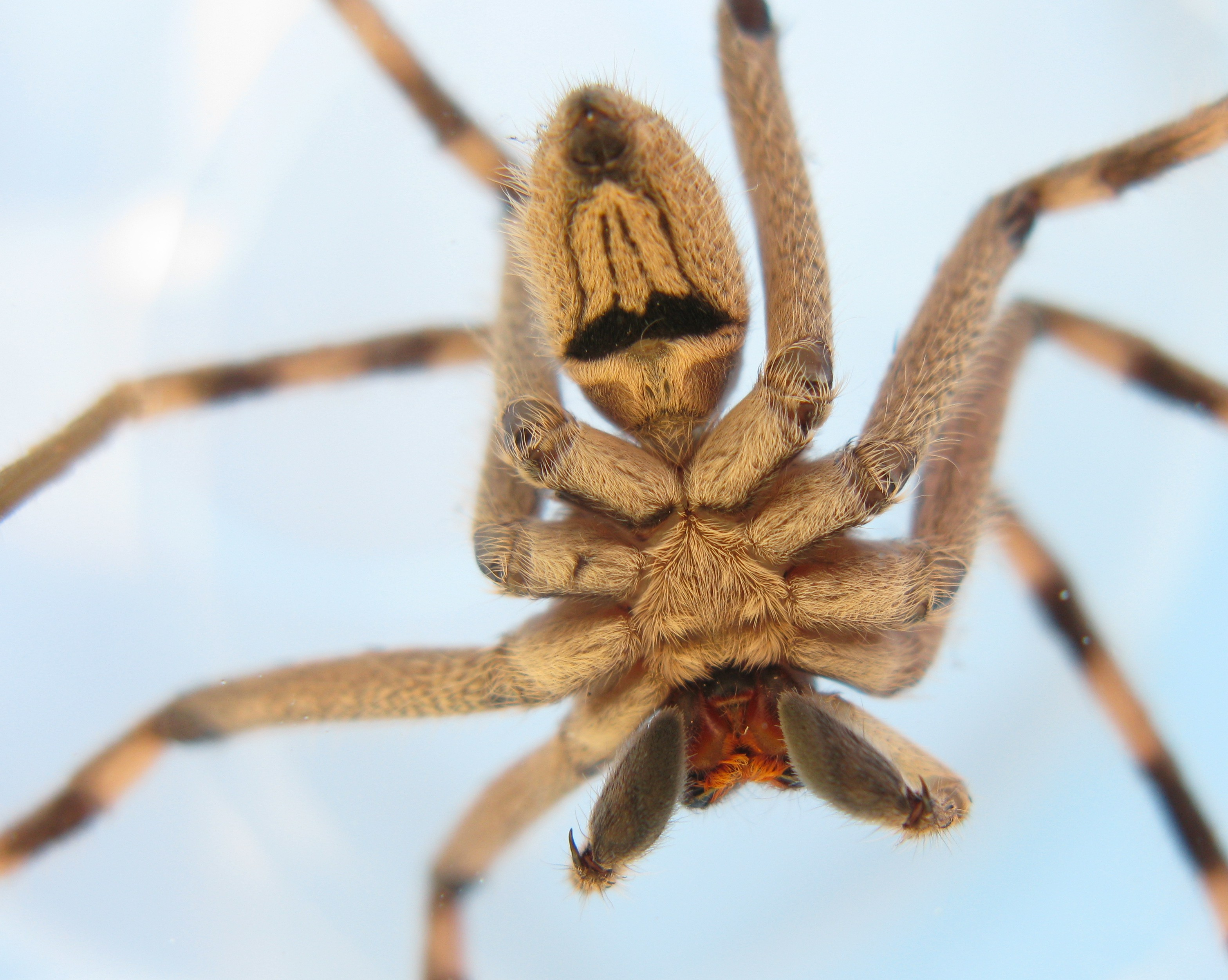
Underside of male P. superciliosus

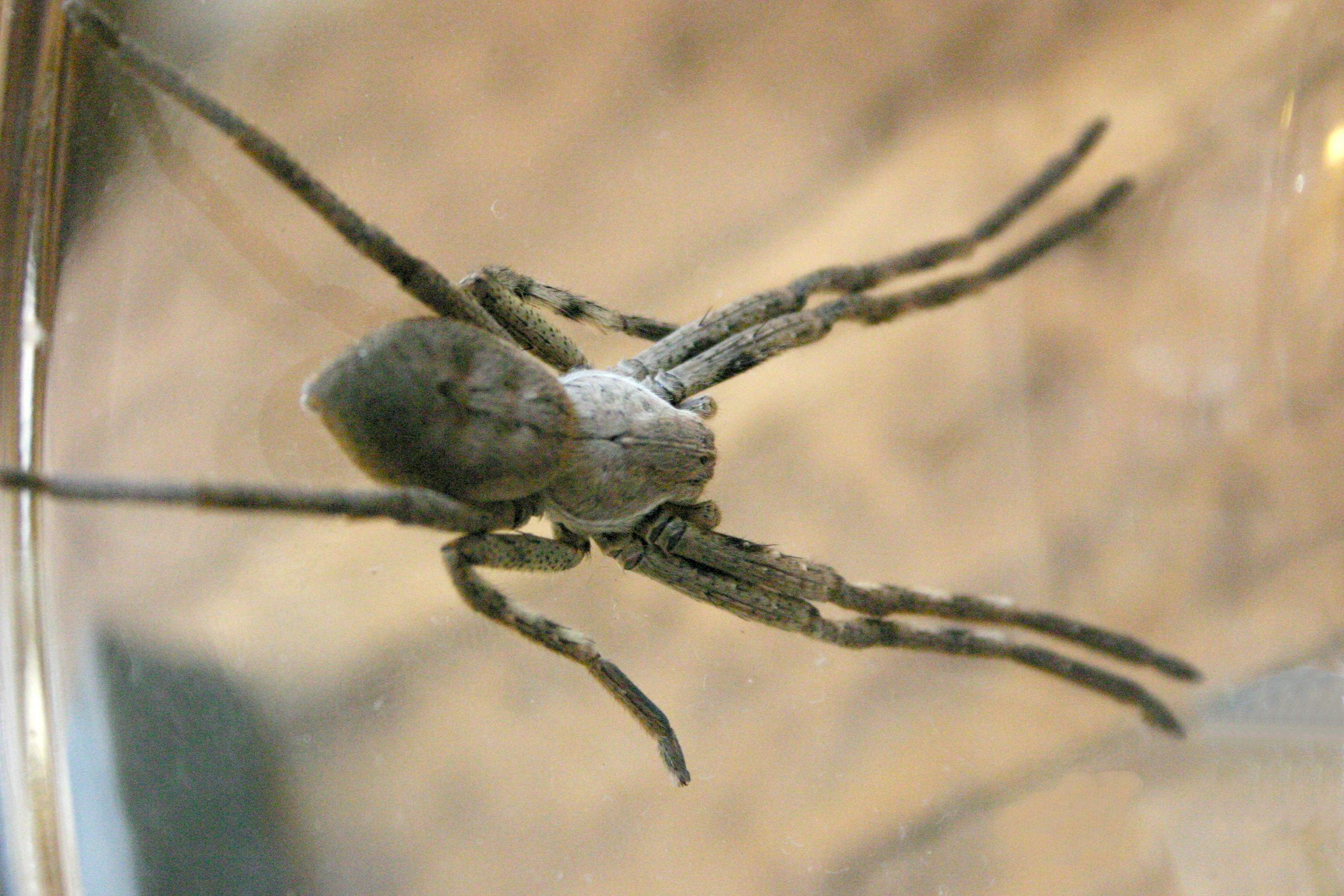
Female P. superciliosus

The size of Palystes spiders, combined with the banding on the underside of the legs exposed when the spider is in threat pose, give them a fearsome appearance. An experiment was done in 1959 where a P. superciliosus was allowed to bite an adult guinea pig on the nose. The guinea pig died within 7 minutes, leading to a belief that the spider's venom was dangerous. However, further research on anaesthetized guinea pigs showed that the original guinea pig had actually died of shock, rather than as a result of the spider's venom. In humans a Palystes bite is no more dangerous than a bee sting. It causes a burning sensation, and swelling which lasts for a few days. Recovery is spontaneous and complete.

== Wasps ==
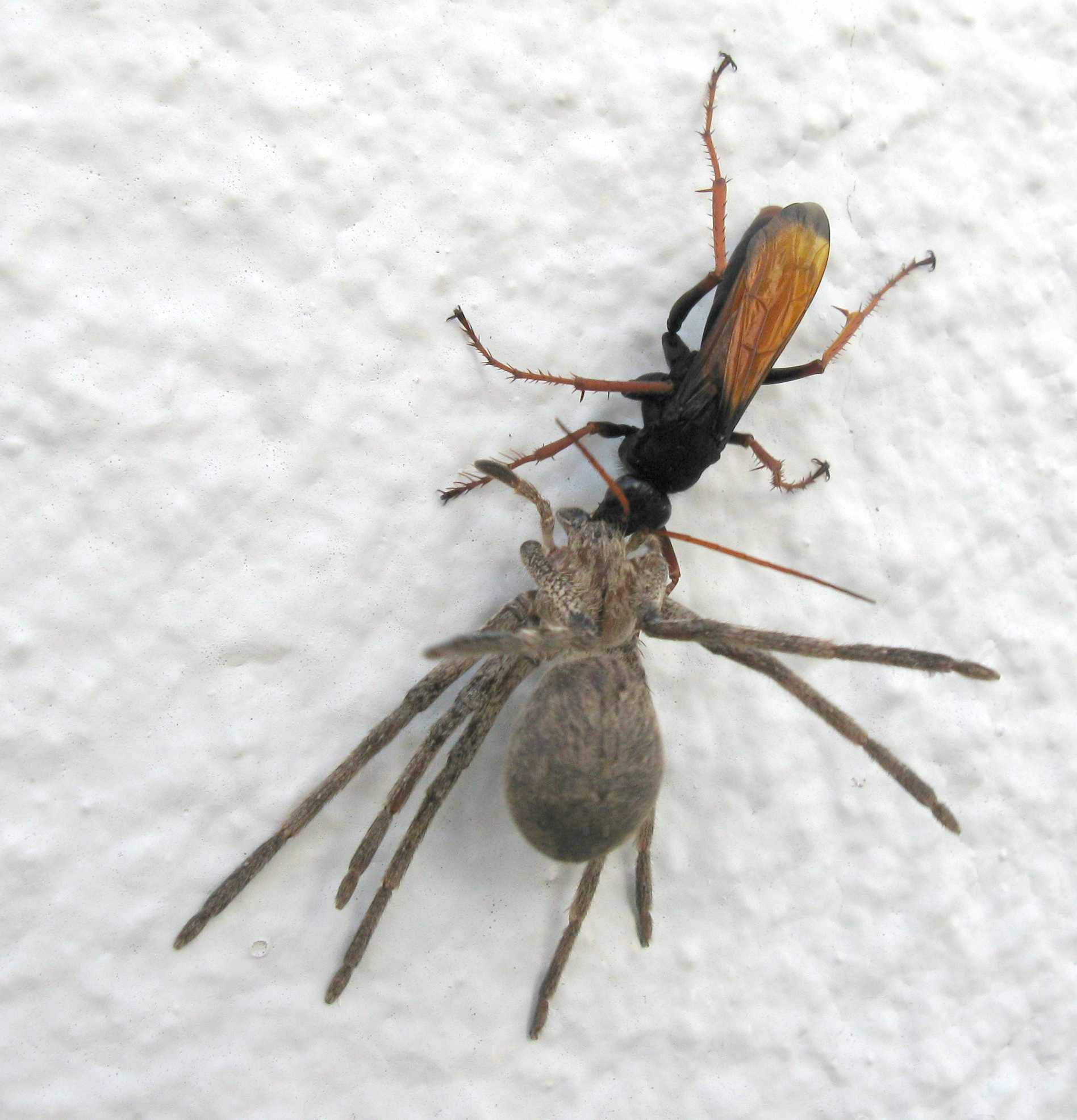
Tachypompilus ignitus dragging Palystes prey up a wall

Palystes spiders are also commonly seen paralysed, being dragged by a large wasp called a pompilid or spider wasp. Sometimes, the wasp is not present. Pompilid wasps only hunt spiders, which they paralyse by stinging them. They then drag the spider back to their nest where they lay an egg on the spider, then seal the spider and the egg in.

When the egg hatches, the larva eats the paralysed spider, keeping the spider alive as long as possible by eating peripheral flesh first, and saving the vital organs till last. By doing this, the spider stays fresh long enough for the wasp larva to mature and pupate.

The pompilid wasp species Tachypompilus ignitus is at least largely a specialist hunter of mature Palystes females.

== Description ==
Palystes species are medium to large spiders, up to 30 mm in body length, with an extended leg span reaching 110 mm.

They are light to dark brown hunting spiders. The carapace is flat posterior to the posterior eye row and slopes downwards from the horizontal fovea. The anterior eye row is straight.

Two distinct longitudinal stripes of white or yellow setae are present at the outer margin of each cheliceral base. The clypeus has a broad clypeal 'moustache' of closely adpressed white to yellow setae. The abdomen dorsally has a clearly outlined brown to black cardiac marking. Ventrally there is a dark to black transverse crescent marking immediately posterior to the epigastric groove, generally with additional black, brown or white markings between the crescent and spinnerets.

The posterior and anterior spinnerets are two-segmented, while the median spinnerets have a single segment. The anterior spinnerets are stout, larger, wider and longer than the posterior and median spinnerets. The colulus is absent.

== Species ==
As of October 2025, this genus includes twenty species:

- Palystes ansiedippenaarae Croeser, 1996 – South Africa
- Palystes castaneus (Latreille, 1819) – Zimbabwe, Mozambique, South Africa (type species)
- Palystes convexus Strand, 1907 – Madagascar
- Palystes crawshayi Pocock, 1902 – South Africa, Lesotho
- Palystes ellioti Pocock, 1896 – DR Congo, Uganda, Rwanda, Tanzania, Malawi
- Palystes fornasinii (Pavesi, 1881) – Mozambique
- Palystes hoehneli Simon, 1890 – Kenya, Tanzania
- Palystes johnstoni Pocock, 1896 – Botswana, Zimbabwe, Malawi, Mozambique, Uganda
- Palystes karooensis Croeser, 1996 – South Africa
- Palystes kreutzmanni Jäger & Kunz, 2010 – South Africa
- Palystes leppanae Pocock, 1902 – South Africa
- Palystes leroyorum Croeser, 1996 – South Africa
- Palystes lunatus Pocock, 1896 – South Africa
- Palystes martinfilmeri Croeser, 1996 – South Africa
- Palystes perornatus Pocock, 1900 – South Africa
- Palystes pinnotheres (Walckenaer, 1805) – Australia (New South Wales), New Caledonia
- Palystes reticulatus Rainbow, 1899 – Solomon Islands
- Palystes stilleri Croeser, 1996 – South Africa
- Palystes stuarti Croeser, 1996 – South Africa
- Palystes superciliosus L. Koch, 1875 – Namibia, Mozambique, South Africa, Eswatini
