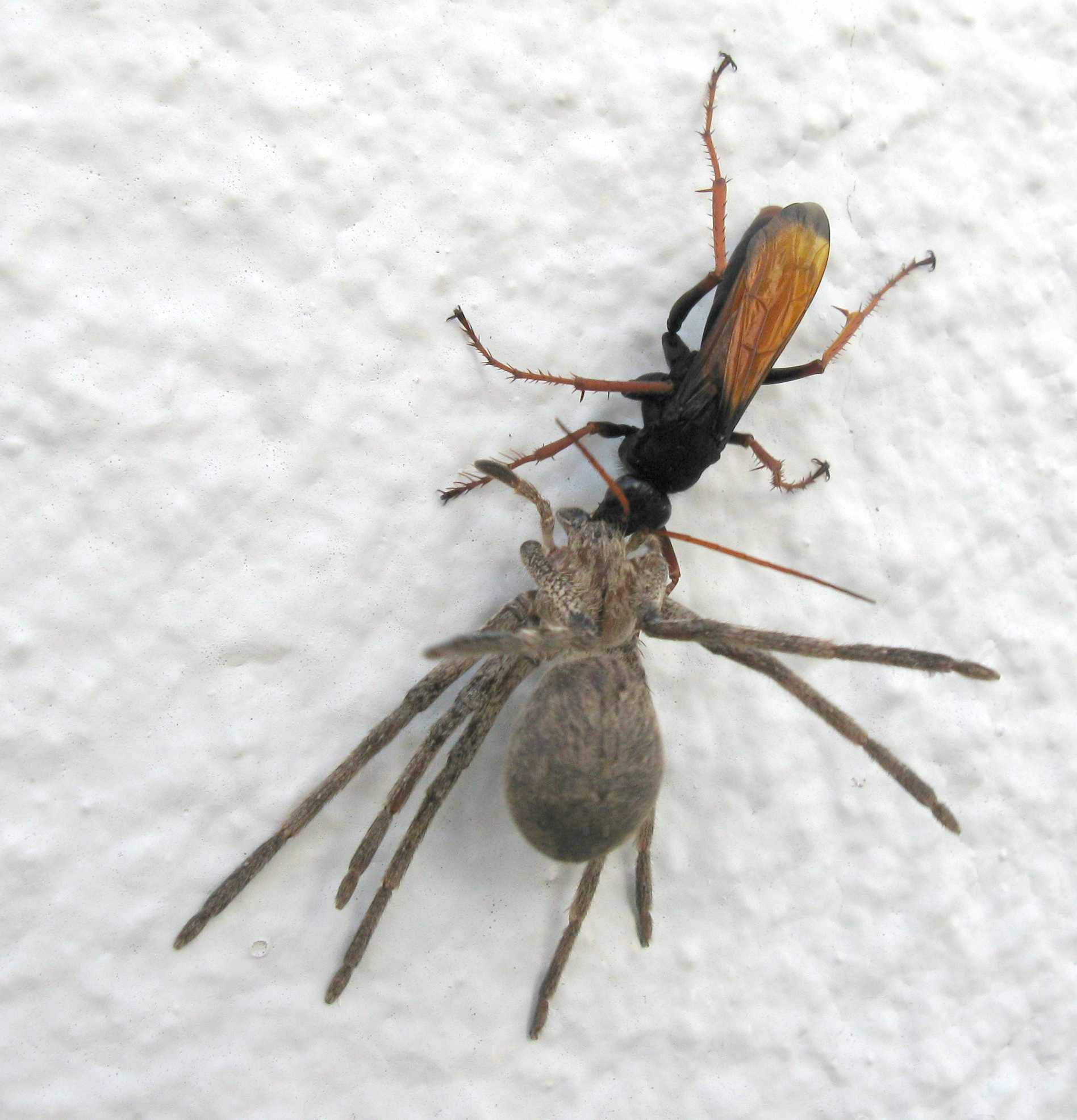
- Tachypompilus ignitus with a Palystes spider

Scientific classification
- Kingdom: Animalia
- Phylum: Arthropoda
- Class: Insecta
- Order: Hymenoptera
- Family: Pompilidae
- Genus: Tachypompilus
- Species: T. ignitus

Binomial name
- Tachypompilus ignitus Smith, 1855

Synonyms
- Afropompilus ignitus (Smith, 1855 (synonym); Anoplius erythrourus (Cameron, 1905); Balanoderes ignitus (Smith, 1855); Pompilogaster erythrura (Cameron, 1905); Pompilus erythrourus (Cameron, 1905); Pompilus ignites (Smith, 1855)

= Tachypompilus ignitus =

Species of wasp

The rain spider wasp or red-femora spider wasp (Tachypompilus ignitus) is an Afrotropical species of spider wasp specialising in capturing spiders of the genus Palystes, the rain spiders.

== Distribution ==
This spider wasp is found in Southern Africa, recorded from South Africa and Zimbabwe.

== Description ==
These wasps are about 45 mm in length. They are largely black with orange antennae, orange dital parts of the legs, and largely orange wings, which are dark at the base and tip.

== Biology ==
Females of T. ignites largely specialise in hunting and capturing rain spiders Palystes spp., which are stung by the wasp; the sting paralyses the spider which is dragged to the wasp's nest. In the nest, the wasp lays an egg on the spider and then seals the nest. When the larva hatches, it consumes the spider, starting with the less vital parts to keep the spider alive for as long as possible, eating the vital organs last. Once finished consuming the prey, the larva pupates, and males usually emerge before females and patrol nest sites looking for newly emerged females with which to mate. Baboon spiders have also been recorded as prey for this wasp. Adults feed on nectar from flowers.
