= Swartberg Nature Reserve =

Protected area in the Western Cape province of South Africa

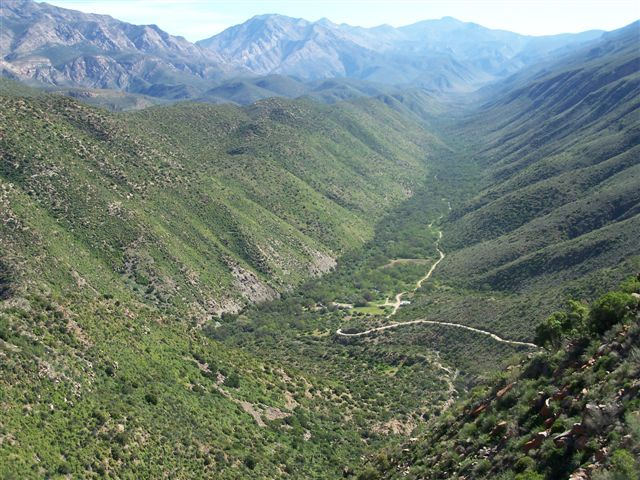

- Location within Western Cape
- Location: Karoo, South Africa
- Nearest city: Prince Albert
- Coordinates: 33°21′09″S 22°0′19″E
- Area: 1,210 km^{2} (470 sq mi)
- Established: 1978
- Governing body: CapeNature
- World Heritage site: 2004 (Cape Floral Region Protected Areas)
- Website: www.capenature.co.za/reserves/swartberg-nature-reserve-gamkaskloof-die-hel/

UNESCO World Heritage Site
- Part of: Cape Floral Region Protected Areas
- Criteria: Natural: ix, x
- Reference: 1007-002
- Inscription: 2004 (28th Session)
- Extensions: 2015

The Swartberg Nature Reserve (Afrikaans: Swartberg Natuur Reservaat) is a protected area in the Western Cape province of South Africa. This 1,210 km^{2} (470 sq mi) protected area is part of the Cape Floral Region Protected Areas World Heritage Site. It is administered by CapeNature.

== See also ==
- Swartberg
- Swartberg Pass
- Gamkaskloof
- Karoo
- Cango Caves
- Meiringspoort
