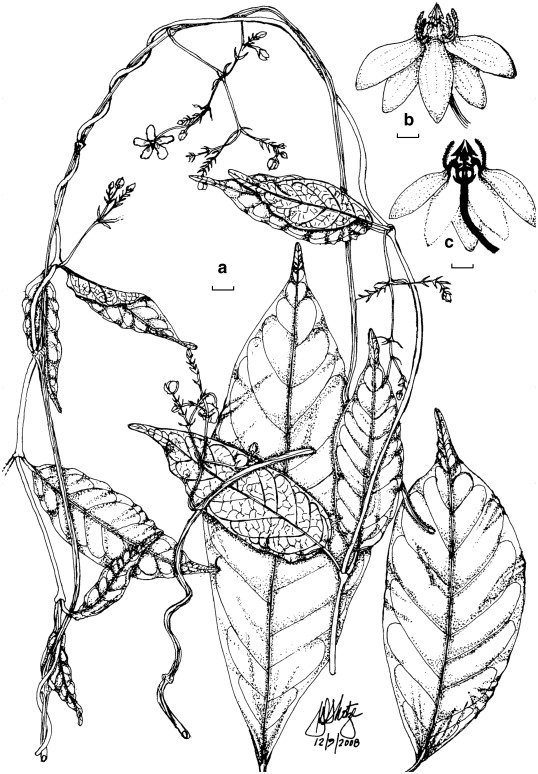
- Botanical illustration of Batesanthus pseudopalpus

Scientific classification
- Kingdom: Plantae
- Clade: Tracheophytes
- Clade: Angiosperms
- Clade: Eudicots
- Clade: Asterids
- Order: Gentianales
- Family: Apocynaceae
- Genus: Batesanthus
- Species: B. pseudopalpus

Binomial name
- Batesanthus pseudopalpus Venter & R.L.Verh.

= Batesanthus pseudopalpus =

Species of flowering plant

Batesanthus pseudopalpus is a species of plant in the Apocynaceae family. It is native to the Republic of the Congo and Gabon. Hendrik J. T. Venter and Rudolf L. Verhoeven, the botanists who first formally described the species, named it after the lobes of its corona which they said resemble the pedipalps of the rain spiders Palystes castaneus and Palystes superciliosus.

== Description ==
It is a herbaceous to slightly woody climbing plant. Its reddish brown, hairless, slightly shiny stems have lenticels. The hairless, dotted leaves are 11.5–22.5 by 4–7.5 centimeters. The leaves are elliptical to egg-shaped with the broadest part toward the tip. The leaves occur opposite one another on the stem. The tips of the leaves come to an abrupt to long, narrow point. The bases are wedge-shaped to rounded. The leaves have 6–8 pairs of secondary veins emanating from their midribs. Its fluted petioles are 1.5 to 5.5 centimeters long. It has fleshy ridges between adjacent petioles which sometimes have multicellular secretory hairs called colleters at their base. It has branched Inflorescences with primary peduncles that are 3.5–6 centimeters long, secondary peduncles that are 2–6 centimeters, and tertiary peduncles that are 0.5–1 centimeters. Each inflorescence has up to 10 flowers. Each flower is on a pedicel that is 1–2 centimeters long. The pedicels have rough, narrow to very narrow, triangular to oval bracts that are 3–5 millimeter long. The bracts have blunt to pointed tips, boat-shaped bases, and fringed margins. Its flowers have 5 rough, narrow, oval to triangular sepals that are 1.5–2 by 1–1.5 millimeters, with pointed tips and fringed margins. Its 5 reddish-violet petals are fused at the base forming a 2–3 millimeter long tubes that are partially covered in fine soft hairs in the inside. The fleshy, hairless, broad, oval to elliptical lobes of the petals are 5–10 by 4–6 millimeters. The tips of the petals are blunt. The flowers have a structure between the petals and the stamens called a corona. Its dark-violet corona is covered in soft white hairs. The corona has fleshy oval to triangular feet that are fused with base of the petals and have thread-like lobes that are 2 millimeters long and curved toward the pistil. The flowers have 5 hairless stamen with oblong to oval anthers that are 2 by 1 millimeters and filaments that are 1 millimeters long. The anthers are fused to the stigma. The pistils are surrounded by 5 concave, rectangular, shelf-shaped nectaries. The pistils have 1 millimeter long, hairless styles shaped like thin tapering cylinders. The triangular stigma have pointed tips and are 1 millimeters long.

=== Reproductive biology ===
The pollen of Batesanthus pseudopalpus is shed as permanent tetrads.

=== Distribution and habitat ===
It has been observed growing in forests.
