= Colleter =

Colleter or Colléter may refer to:

- Colleter (botany) or Colletor, one of the mucilage-secreting hairs on certain plants
- Colleter (company), a company in France
- Patrick Colleter, a professional football player
- Solenn Colléter, a French novelist
