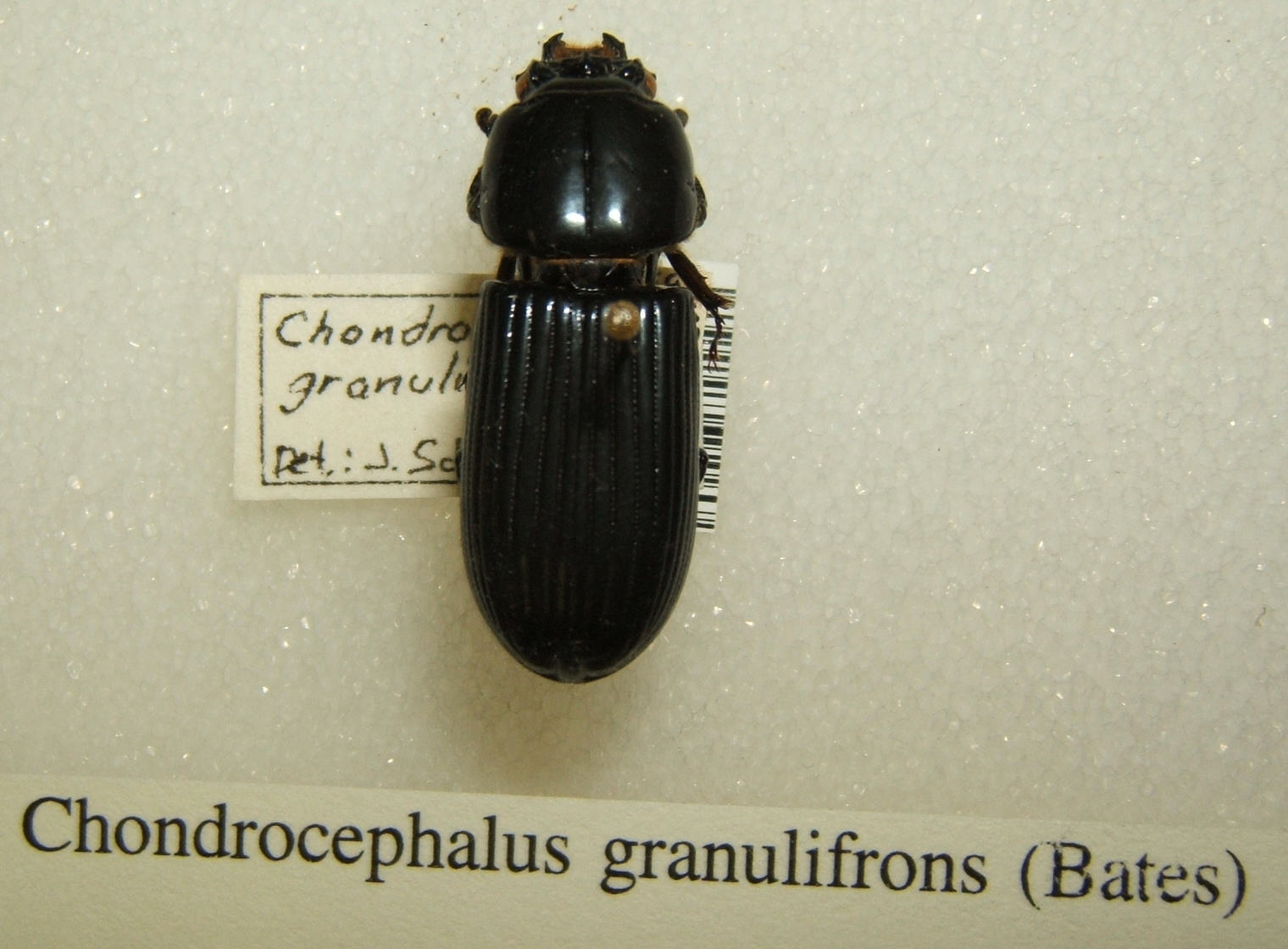
- Adult

Scientific classification
- Kingdom: Animalia
- Phylum: Arthropoda
- Clade: Pancrustacea
- Class: Insecta
- Order: Coleoptera
- Suborder: Polyphaga
- Infraorder: Scarabaeiformia
- Family: Passalidae
- Subfamily: Passalinae
- Tribe: Proculini
- Genus: Chondrocephalus
- Species: C. granulifrons

Binomial name
- Chondrocephalus granulifrons (Bates, 1886)

Synonyms
- Popilius granulifrons

= Chondrocephalus granulifrons =

Species of beetle

Chondrocephalus granulifrons is a species of beetle in the family Passalidae. It was first described by George Latimer Bates in 1886 under the name Popilius granulifrons.

This species is found in Guatemala, Ecuador, and Mexico.
