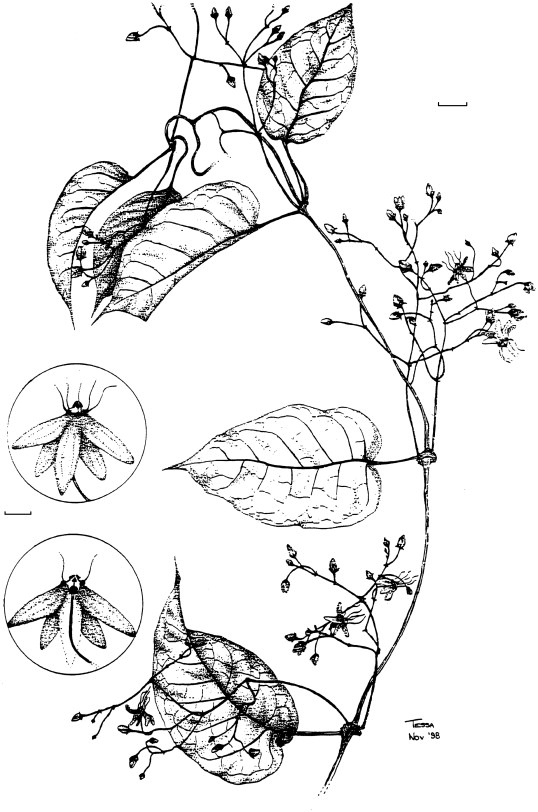
- Botanical illustration of Batesanthus purpureus

Scientific classification
- Kingdom: Plantae
- Clade: Tracheophytes
- Clade: Angiosperms
- Clade: Eudicots
- Clade: Asterids
- Order: Gentianales
- Family: Apocynaceae
- Genus: Batesanthus
- Species: B. purpureus

Binomial name
- Batesanthus purpureus N.E.Br.

Synonyms
- Cryptolepis purpureus (N.E.Br.) P.I.Forst.; Batesanthus intrusus S.Moore; Batesanthus mildbraedii Schltr.; Batesanthus talbotii S.Moore; Batesanthus talbotii var. grandifolius S.Moore; Perithrix glabra Pierre

= Batesanthus purpureus =

Species of flowering plant

Batesanthus purpureus is a species of plant in the Apocynaceae family. It is native to the Cameroon, the Central African Republic, Democratic Republic of the Congo, Gabon, Guinea, Ivory Coast, Liberia, and Nigeria. Nicholas Edward Brown, the botanist who first formally described the species, named it after its purple (purpureus in Latin) flowers.

== Description ==
It is herbaceous to slightly woody climbing plant that reaches 4–5 meters in height. It has fleshy, tuberous roots that are 3 centimeters in diameter and up to 30 centimeters long. Its purplish, hairless, slightly shiny stems have lenticels. The hairless, dotted leaves are 7.5–19 by 4.5–9.5 centimeters. The leaves are elliptical to egg-shaped. The leaves occur opposite one another on the stem. The tips of the leaves taper to a point. The bases are heart-shaped. The leaves have 6–9 pairs of reddish-purple secondary veins emanating from their midribs. Its fluted petioles are 2–5.5 centimeters long. It has ridges between adjacent petioles which sometimes have multicellular secretory hairs called colleters at their base. It has branched Inflorescences with primary peduncles that are 2.5–7 centimeters long, secondary peduncles that are 2.5–6.5 centimeters, and tertiary peduncles that are 1–6 centimeters. Each inflorescence has up to 15 flowers. Each flower is on a pedicel that is 5–10 millimeters long. The pedicels have triangular bracts that are 1 millimeter long. The bracts have fringed margins. Its flowers have 5 oval to narrowly triangular sepals that are 1.5–2 by 1–2 millimeters, with pointed to blunt tips and sparsely fringed margins. Its 5 petals are fused at the base forming 1–2 millimeter long tube. The wrinkled, hairless, broad, oval to elliptical lobes of the petals are 3–11 by 1–6 millimeters. The petals are pale green on the outside and dark purple on the inside. The tips of the petals are blunt and the margins are wavy. The flowers have a structure between the petals and the stamens called a corona. Its blackish-purple corona is hairless. The corona has fleshy oval feet that are fused with base of the petals and can have thread-like lobes that are 0.5 millimeters long. The flowers have 5 hairless, whitish stamen with oval anthers that are 1 by 0.5 millimeters and thread-like filaments that are 0.5 millimeters long. The pistil are surrounded by 5 concave, rectangular, shelf-shaped nectaries. The pistils have 1–1.3 millimeter long, hairless styles shaped like thin tapering cylinders. The triangular stigma have pointed tips and are 1 millimeters long. The fruit occur as singles or in pairs and are tapering, oval cylinders that are 6–7.5 by 9–10.4 centimeters.

=== Reproductive biology ===
The pollen of Batesanthus purpureus is shed as permanent tetrads.

=== Distribution and habitat ===
It has been observed growing in forests.
