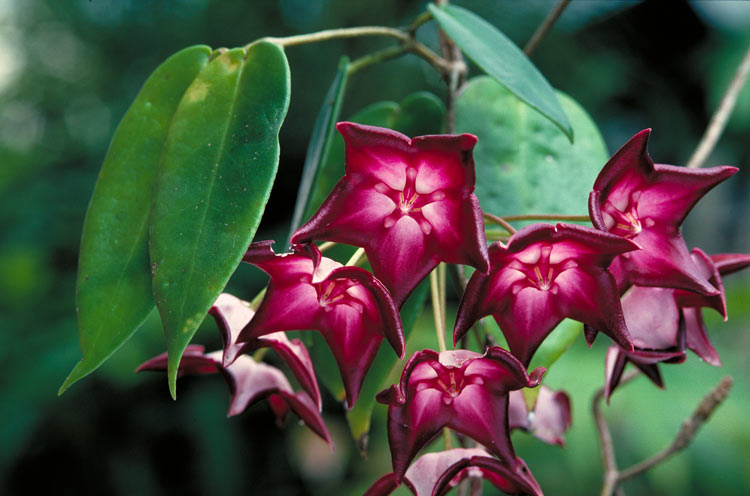

Conservation status
- Rare (NCA)

Scientific classification
- Kingdom: Plantae
- Clade: Tracheophytes
- Clade: Angiosperms
- Clade: Eudicots
- Clade: Asterids
- Order: Gentianales
- Family: Apocynaceae
- Genus: Hoya
- Species: H. macgillivrayi

Binomial name
- Hoya macgillivrayi F.M.Bailey

= Hoya macgillivrayi =

Species of plant

Hoya macgillivrayi, commonly known as red hoya or Macgillivray's wax flower, is a species of vine endemic to Cape York Peninsula in Queensland, and has egg-shaped to lance-shaped leaves and racemes of dark reddish-pink flowers, sometimes with a white centre, and a reddish-pink corona.

== Description ==
Hoya macgillivrayi is a vine with stems less than 20 mm (0.79 in) in diameter and containing white, milky sap. Its leaves are glabrous, egg-shaped to lance-shaped, up to 200 mm (7.9 in) long and to 80 mm (3.1 in) wide with two to five colleters. The flowers are fleshy, glabrous, flattened bell-shaped, dark reddish-pink, sometimes with a white centre, 55–80 mm (2.2–3.1 in) in diameter with six to ten flowers. Each flower is on a pedicel 54–85 mm (2.1–3.3 in) long and has narrowly oblong lobes 20–25 mm (0.79–0.98 in) long and 19–23 mm (0.75–0.91 in) wide with the edges curved down. The corona has linear lobes 10–12 mm (0.39–0.47 in) long and 2–3 mm (0.079–0.118 in) wide and reddish-pink. Flowering occurs from May to October and the fruit is a follicle about 250 mm (9.8 in) long and 16 mm (0.63 in) wide.

== Taxonomy ==
Hoya macgillivrayi was first formally described in 1914 by Frederick Manson Bailey in the Queensland Agricultural Journal from specimens collected by William MacGillivray near "Claudie River, Lloyd Bay". The specific epithet (macgillivrayi) honours the collector of the type specimens.

== Distribution and habitat ==
This species of Hoya grows in rainforest and monsoon forest in the Iron Range, Queensland and McIlwraith Ranges on Cape York Peninsula, from sea level to 450 m (1,480 ft).

== Conservation status ==
Hoya macgillivrayi is listed as "near threatened" under the Queensland Government Nature Conservation Act 1992.

== Use in horticulture ==
This species requires a loose, friable peaty soil mixture and good drainage. Plants perform better when root-bound, with small applications of slow-release fertiliser at nine-monthly intervals.
