= Chondrocephalus =

Scientific classification
- Domain: Eukaryota
- Kingdom: Animalia
- Phylum: Arthropoda
- Class: Insecta
- Order: Coleoptera
- Suborder: Polyphaga
- Infraorder: Scarabaeiformia
- Family: Passalidae
- Subfamily: Passalinae
- Tribe: Proculini
- Genus: Chondrocephalus; Kuwert, 1896

Genus of beetles

Chondrocephalus is a genus of bess beetles in the family Passalidae. There are about nine described species in Chondrocephalus.

== Species ==
These nine species belong to the genus Chondrocephalus:

- Chondrocephalus debilis (Bates, 1886) (Guatemala, Mexico)
- Chondrocephalus gemmae Reyes-Castillo & Castillo, 1986 (Mexico)
- Chondrocephalus granulifrons (Bates, 1886) (Guatemala, Ecuador, Mexico)
- Chondrocephalus granulum Kuwert, 1897 (El Salvador, Guatemala, Mexico)
- Chondrocephalus guatemalae (Reyes-Castillo & Schuster, 1983) (Guatemala)
- Chondrocephalus pokomchii (Schuster, 1991) (Guatemala)
- Chondrocephalus purulensis (Bates, 1886) (Guatemala, Mexico)
- Chondrocephalus reyesi (Schuster, 1988) (Honduras)
- Chondrocephalus salvadorae (Schuster, 1989) (El Salvador)
