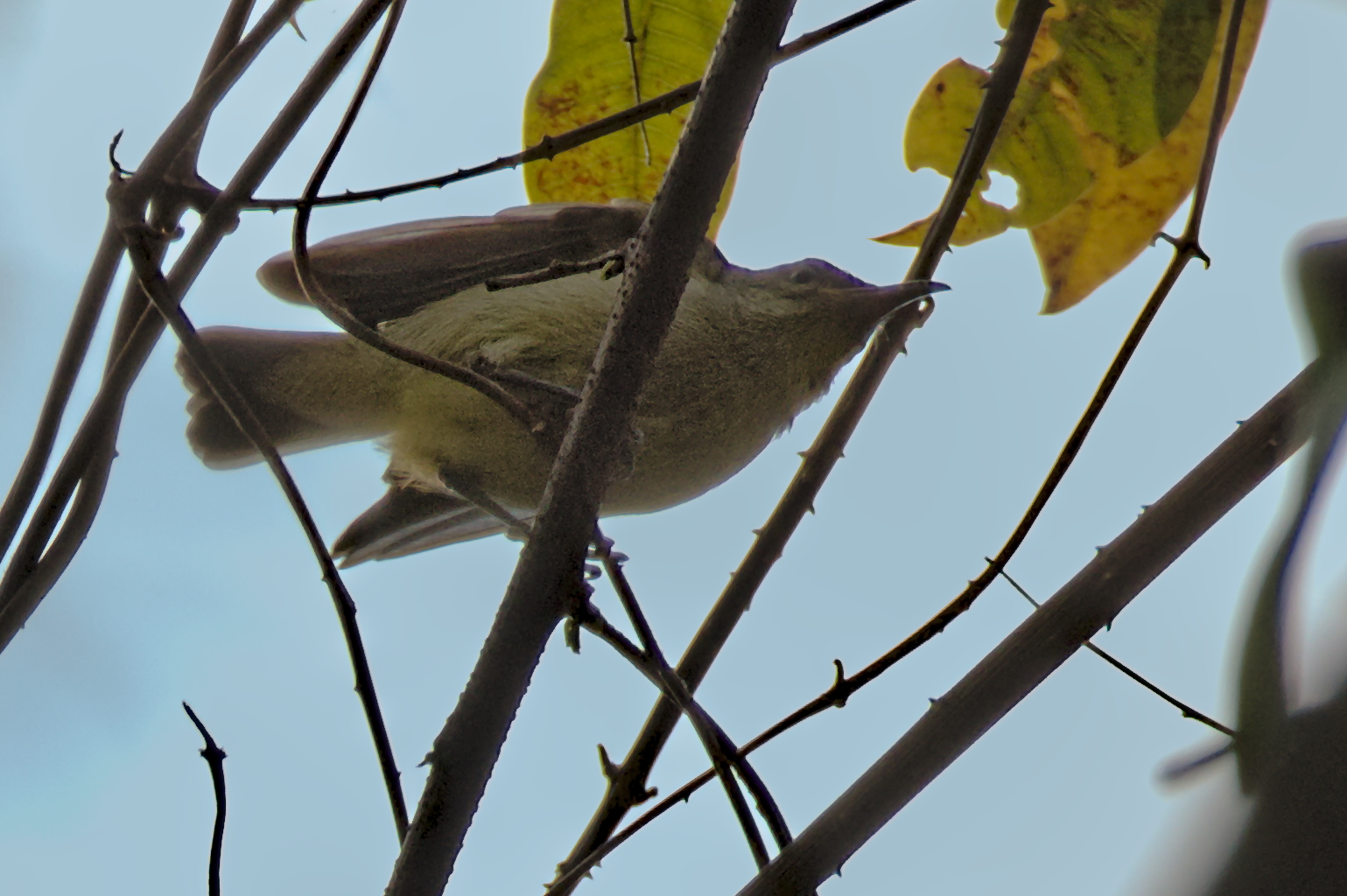

Conservation status
- Least Concern (IUCN 3.1)

Scientific classification
- Kingdom: Animalia
- Phylum: Chordata
- Class: Aves
- Order: Passeriformes
- Family: Nectariniidae
- Genus: Cinnyris
- Species: C. batesi

Binomial name
- Cinnyris batesi Ogilvie-Grant, 1908

Synonyms
- Nectarinia batesi

= Bates's sunbird =

Species of bird

Bates's sunbird (Cinnyris batesi) is a species of sunbird in the family Nectariniidae which occurs in Western African forests and Central African rainforests, and locally in other types of forest in Central Africa.

== Taxonomy ==
Monotypic.

== Description ==
Bates's sunbird is a very small dull green sunbird with a short, decurved bill a short tail and a yellowish belly. The male has dark olive upperparts, except for a vague pale supercilium, with paler greyer underparts with a pale buffy centre to the belly. The wings are dark brown with pale fringes and the tail is black with wide olive edges and tips to the outer tail feathers. There are long wispy yellow feathers on the sides of the breast, in the otherwise similar female these feathers are whiter and may be much reduced in length. They measure 9–10 cm in length and weigh 5.7–7g. Given the species overall drab plumage and furtive habits, it can be easily overlooked.

== Distribution ==
Bates's sunbird is an uncommon resident of forest and rainforest from Liberia in the west to the eastern Democratic Republic of the Congo in the east, occurring south as far as Angola and northern Zambia. This species is also known from Bioko.

== Habitat ==
Bates's sunbird is found in the canopy of trees in primary rainforest, also at forest edges, secondary growth and cultivated areas with tall trees.

== Habits ==
Bates's sunbirds feed on nectar from blossoms on flowering trees, Macaranga assas is known to be fed on. Also insects, spiders, berries and fruits. It will form small flocks of ten or so and will also join mixed species flocks. They are often seen on branches with a lot of moss and epiphytes. At night it is able to reduce its metabolism to save energy.

The nest is a hanging pocket made of pappus, dry leaves and spiders webs with green moss placed on the outside and lined with natural cotton-like fibres, it is suspended from a bush at about 3m above the ground or even from cables in abandoned buildings. 1-2 eggs are laid in July in Cameroon, December in the Democratic Republic of Congo and February in Gabon.

== Naming ==
Its common name and Latin binomial commemorate George Latimer Bates (1863–1940), an American naturalist who traveled in West Africa.
