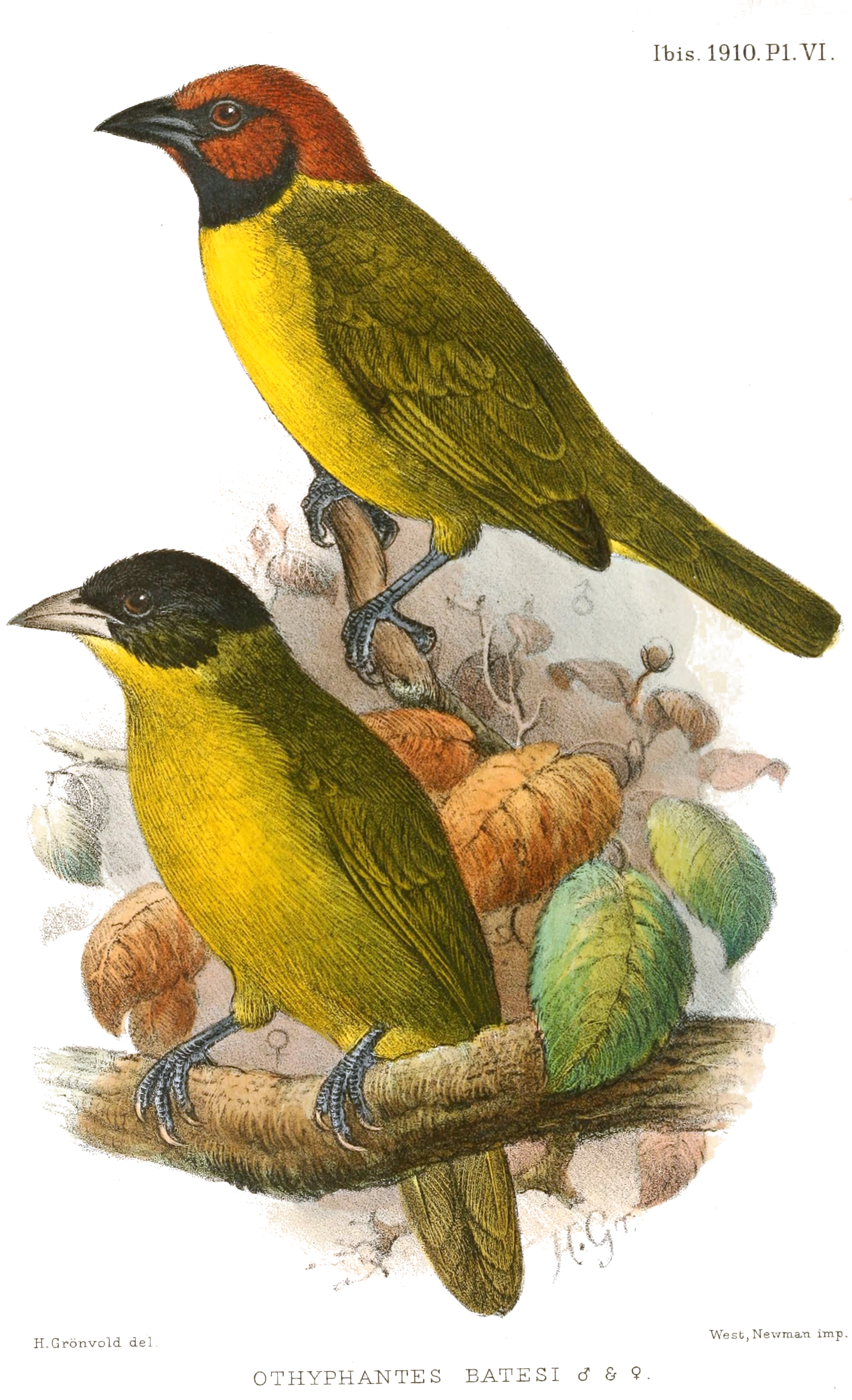

Conservation status
- Endangered (IUCN 3.1)

Scientific classification
- Kingdom: Animalia
- Phylum: Chordata
- Class: Aves
- Order: Passeriformes
- Family: Ploceidae
- Genus: Ploceus
- Species: P. batesi

Binomial name
- Ploceus batesi (Sharpe, 1908)

Synonyms
- Othyphantes batesi

= Bates's weaver =

Species of bird

Bates's weaver (Ploceus batesi) is a species of bird in the family Ploceidae. It is endemic to Cameroon, and is often regarded as inexplicably rare across its distribution.

== Description ==
Similar in size and shape to other members of the genus Ploceus. Males are distinctive in their yellow undersides, bright chestnut heads with limited black throats, and olive green backs.

== Taxonomy ==
It is named after George Latimer Bates, who collected the type specimen (a young female) near the Dja River on 29 January 1906.

== Distribution and habitat ==
=== Distribution ===
Known only from Cameroon.

=== Habitat ===
Its natural habitat is subtropical or tropical moist lowland forests. It is threatened by habitat loss.
