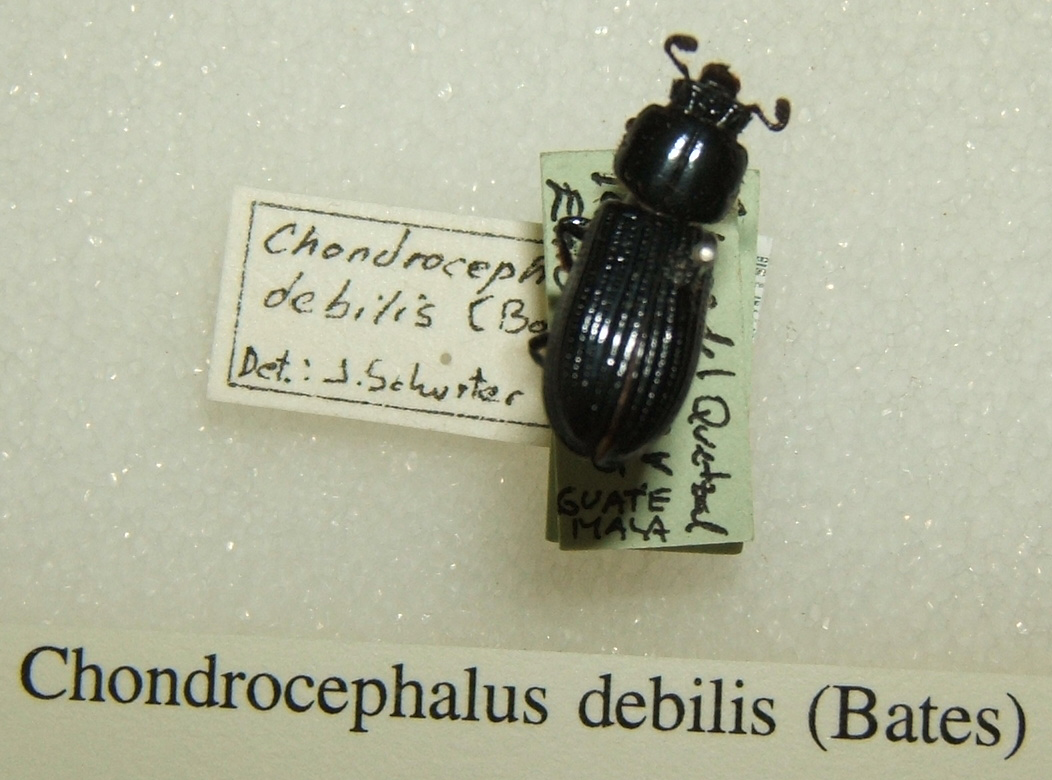
- Chondrocephalus debilis, adult

Scientific classification
- Domain: Eukaryota
- Kingdom: Animalia
- Phylum: Arthropoda
- Class: Insecta
- Order: Coleoptera
- Suborder: Polyphaga
- Infraorder: Scarabaeiformia
- Family: Passalidae
- Subfamily: Passalinae
- Tribe: Proculini
- Genus: Chondrocephalus
- Species: C. debilis

Binomial name
- Chondrocephalus debilis (Bates, 1886)

= Chondrocephalus debilis =

Species of beetle

Chondrocephalus debilis is a species of beetle of the family Passalidae. They are found in Mexico and Guatemala.
