= Batesanthus =

Scientific classification
- Kingdom: Plantae
- Clade: Tracheophytes
- Clade: Angiosperms
- Clade: Eudicots
- Clade: Asterids
- Order: Gentianales
- Family: Apocynaceae
- Genus: Batesanthus; N.E.Br.

Genus of flowering plants

Batesanthus is a genus of flowering plants belonging to the family Apocynaceae.

Its native range is Western Tropical Africa to Angola. The genus is named after George Latimer Bates.

Species:

- Batesanthus parviflorus Norman
- Batesanthus pseudopalpus Venter & R.L.Verh.
- Batesanthus purpureus N.E.Br.
