= George Latimer Bates =

American naturalist

George Griswold Latimer Bates
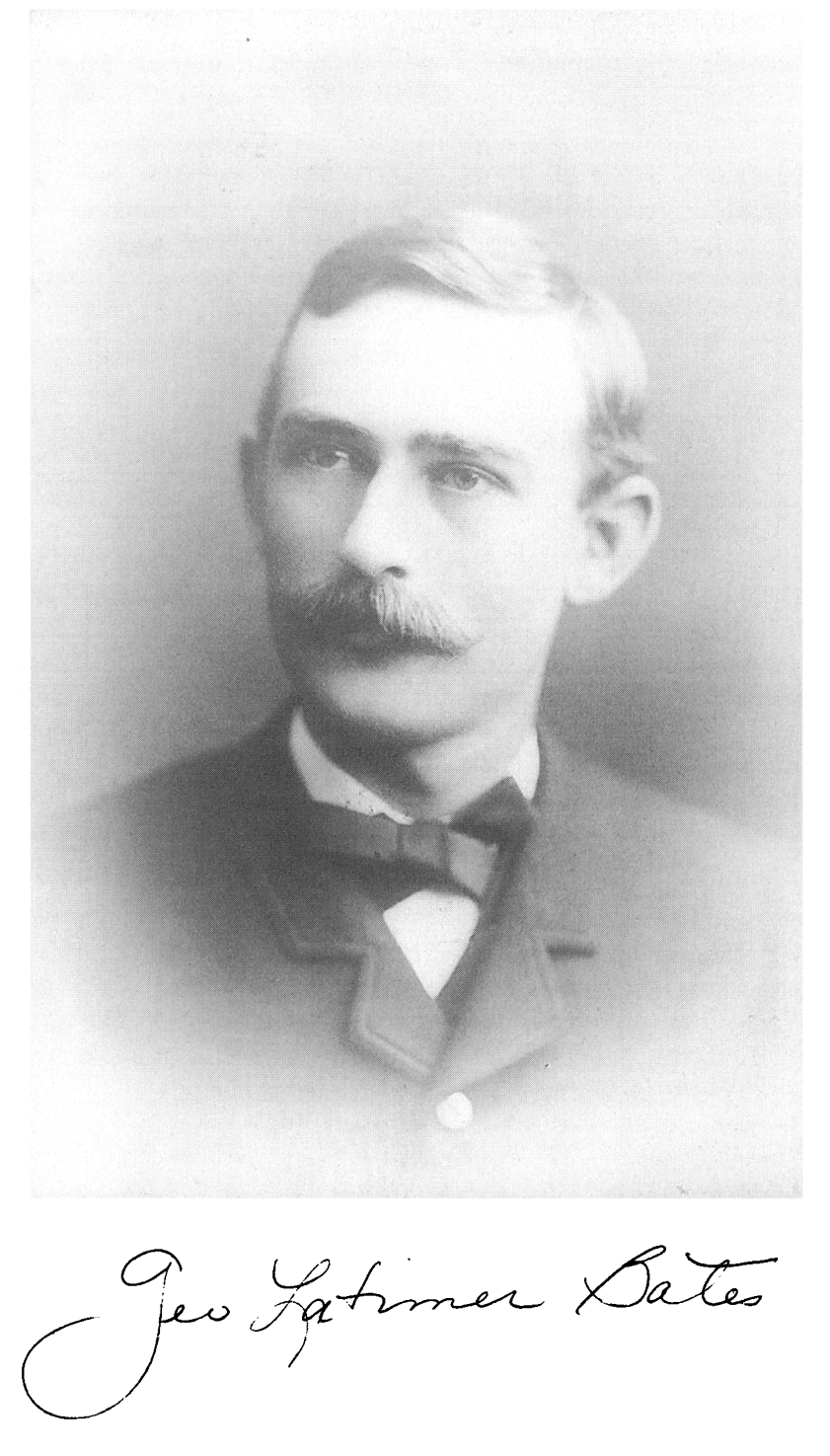
- Born: March 21, 1863; Abingdon, Illinois US
- Died: January 31, 1940 (aged 76); Chelmsford UK
- Occupation: naturalist
- Notable work: Handbook of the Birds of West Africa

George Griswold Latimer Bates (March 21, 1863, Abingdon, Illinois US – January 31, 1940 Chelmsford UK), LL.D., M.B.O.U. was an American naturalist. He lived in central Africa and travelled widely, collecting specimens of natural history from which numerous new species were described. As many as 62 new species of mammals, reptiles and amphibians were described from his collections, including the Goliath frog, the hairy frog, and the Goliath shrew Crocidura goliath. He published a Handbook of the Birds of West Africa (1930) and was compiling a catalogue of the birds of Arabia.

== Life and work ==
Bates was born near Abingdon, Illinois. He went to school where he learned Latin and became interested in languages. He got an interest in natural history from his teacher Leanna Hague who took the class on botanical trips. He went to study at Lincoln, Illinois, and then transferred to Knox College, Galesburg. He worked in the summer to help produce maps for the Santa Fe Railroad in Knox County and Galesburg. After graduating with a doctor of letters from Knox College in 1885, he became a teacher in Hawaii but quit after a few months. He then worked as a surveyor for a railroad company in Tennessee. Following his parents' wishes, he joined the Chicago Theological Seminary where he studied Greek and Hebrew and graduated with a theology degree in 1892. He then taught at Ward Academy in South Dakota, using his free time to study the plants of the region.

=== Cameroon ===
In 1895, he went to West Africa ostensibly to work in a Presbyterian Mission but primarily to collect natural history specimens. There, he took an interest in the local language and began to document the Bulu grammar and vocabulary. This led to a publication of a textbook in 1926. He lived initially at Senji, later at Efulen near Great Batanga in the German part of Cameroon, making a living from farming. He was known by the locals as "Bitye" and he called his farm by the same name. He collected natural history specimens both around him and on his travels and sent many of these to the Natural History Museum in London. He made use of native hunters to assist him in his collections. Some of the natives believed that he sought to collect male and female specimens so as to populate his own country with the bird species. Richard Bowdler Sharpe noted in 1906 that Bates' specimens were valuable and that there were several new species. By 1928, the number of specimens he had sent to the museum was estimated at 6905. During World War I, Bates was unable to send specimens and he began to spend more time on his farm cultivating cocoa, coffee and rubber trees: his may have been the earliest rubber plantations in the region. The German authorities forced him to hand over his guns (used for bird collecting) and he was asked to leave the region in 1915. He then moved south on foot to Rio Beneto in the Spanish Guinea. It was only in 1916 that he returned to his plantation and by 1921 he had travelled across the Cameroon which was controlled by Britain and France. He wrote on the structure of the underwing coverts in 1918. In 1922, he travelled to Nigeria and in 1927, he visited the northwest of Lake Chad.

=== England ===
Bates left Africa and moved to live in England in Little Watham, Essex in 1928 and settled in a home that he called 'Timbuctoo'. He then began to examine the bird collections in the bird room in the British Museum, London, and began to work on a Handbook of the Birds of West Africa. In 1930, he made a collecting trip to Sierra Leone for the Natural History Museum, and also visited Guinea and Mount Nimba. In 1931, he went on another expedition to Mali. He was asked to examine the specimen collection of Harry St John Bridger Philby. He learned Arabic and visited Arabia at the age of 70 in 1934 on the invitation of Philby. He spent three months and collected more than 500 specimens. Bates trained Philby's servant to skin and had an Indian clerk, Mahbub Elahi Kazi, collect specimens with a 16-bore gun. He also left a .410 bore shotgun for Philby to obtain more bird specimens even though the latter found it difficult to skin birds. Because of this, Norman Kinnear influenced the Bombay Natural History Society to send a skinner named Fateh Khan to Arabia. The skinner, however, proved to be inexperienced, fell sick, and was forced to return to India. Philby's specimens included several new species including Dendrocopus dorae which he requested be named after his wife Dora. He also had a subspecies of owl named as Otus senegalensis pamelae named after Miss Pamela Lovibond, a friend and librarian at the Athenaeum Club. Bates was unable to publish the Birds of Arabia but wrote several papers on Arabian birds for the Ibis. His unpublished manuscript on the Birds of Arabia was later used by Richard Meinertzhagen who added various embellishments and gave little credit to Bates. Bates died in Chelmsford following a surgery and recurring serious illness.

== Taxon named in his honor ==
- A species of African snake, Rhamnophis batesii, is named in his honor,

as are three species of African amphibians

- Astylosternus batesi,
- Phrynobatrachus batesii, and
- Bate's tree toad Nectophryne batesii from middle Africa.

in addition twenty birds and several species of bird bear his name

- including the rare Bates's weaver, Ploceus batesi from the Cameroon.
- Bates's swift Apus batesi is a species of small swift in the family Apodidae which is found in western Africa.
- Bates's sunbird (Cinnyris batesi) is a species of sunbird in the family Nectariniidae which occurs in Western African forests and Central African rainforests, and locally in other types of forest in Central Africa.
- Bates's paradise flycatcher Terpsiphone batesi is a passerine bird belonging to the monarch-flycatcher family, Monarchidae.

and four mammals.

A plant genus:

- Batesanthus is a genus of flowering plants belonging to the family Apocynaceae named after him.

From the Cameroons Raiamas batesii is a species of cyprinid fish.
