= Solenn Colléter =

- Born: 1974 (age 51–52)
- Education: École nationale de l'aviation civile - Aerospace engineer
- Occupation: Novelist

Solenn Colléter is a French novelist born in Paris in 1974.

== Biography ==
Graduate from École nationale de l'aviation civile ("French civil aviation university" ; promotion 1993), she is aerospace engineer in Toulouse and lives in a commune of Aude department. She is the author of Je suis morte et je n’ai rien appris ("I am dead and I learned nothing" ; Éditions Albin Michel) relating to hazing in university studies.

== Bibliography ==
- Solenn Colléter, Lettres de sang sur la côte sauvage, Alain Bargain, 2005, 541 p. (ISBN 978-2914532662)
- Solenn Colléter, Je suis morte et je n'ai rien appris, Albin Michel, 2007, 359 p. (ISBN 978-2226179609)
