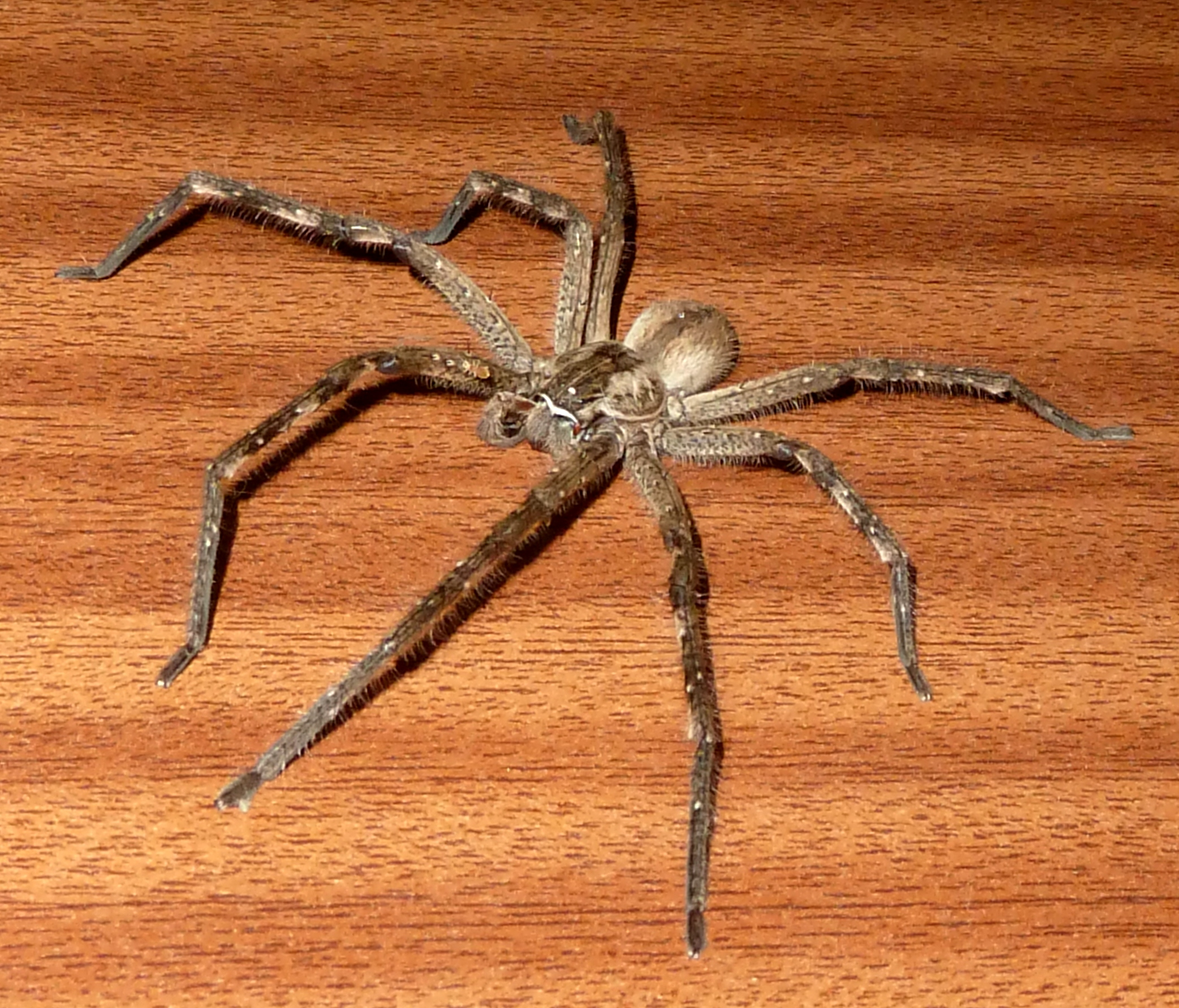
- Female Palystes superciliosus
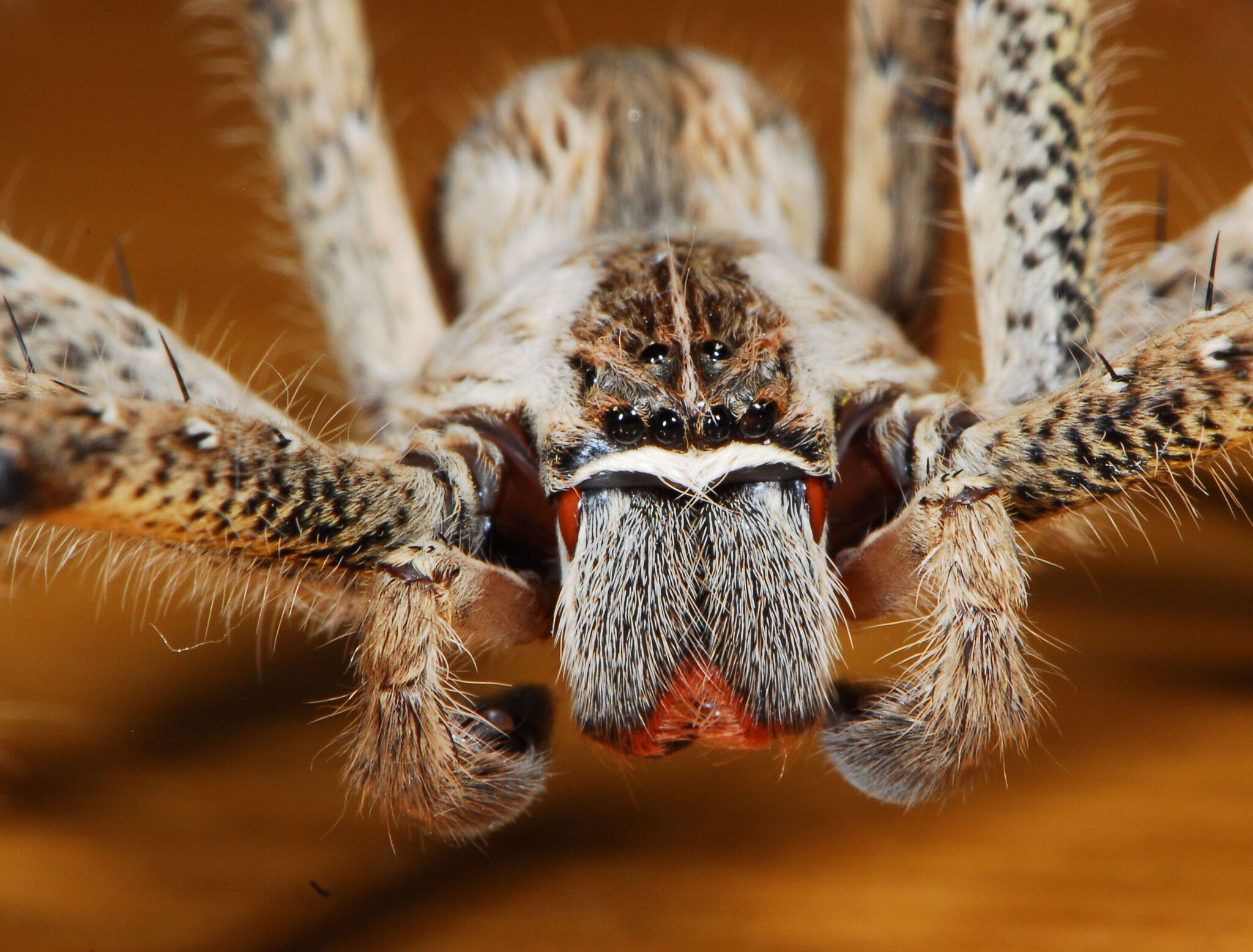
- Female

Scientific classification
- Kingdom: Animalia
- Phylum: Arthropoda
- Subphylum: Chelicerata
- Class: Arachnida
- Order: Araneae
- Infraorder: Araneomorphae
- Family: Sparassidae
- Genus: Palystes
- Species: P. superciliosus

Binomial name
- Palystes superciliosus L. Koch, 1875

Synonyms
- Heteropoda natalia Karsch, 1878; Olios natalicus Simon, 1880; Palystes spenceri Pocock, 1896; Palystes pulchripes Pocock, 1896; Palystes natalius Pocock, 1898; Palystes modificus Strand, 1906

= Palystes superciliosus =

Species of spider

The common rain spider (Palystes superciliosus), formerly P. natalius, is a species of huntsman spider native to Southern Africa. It is the most common and widespread species in the genus Palystes.

In South Africa its distribution ranges from KwaZulu-Natal province in the east, then westwards to the provinces of Mpumalanga, Limpopo, Gauteng and North West in the north, and Eastern Cape and Western Cape in the south. It has a body length of 15–36 mm and a leg span of up to 110mm. The species was first described by Ludwig Carl Christian Koch in 1875.

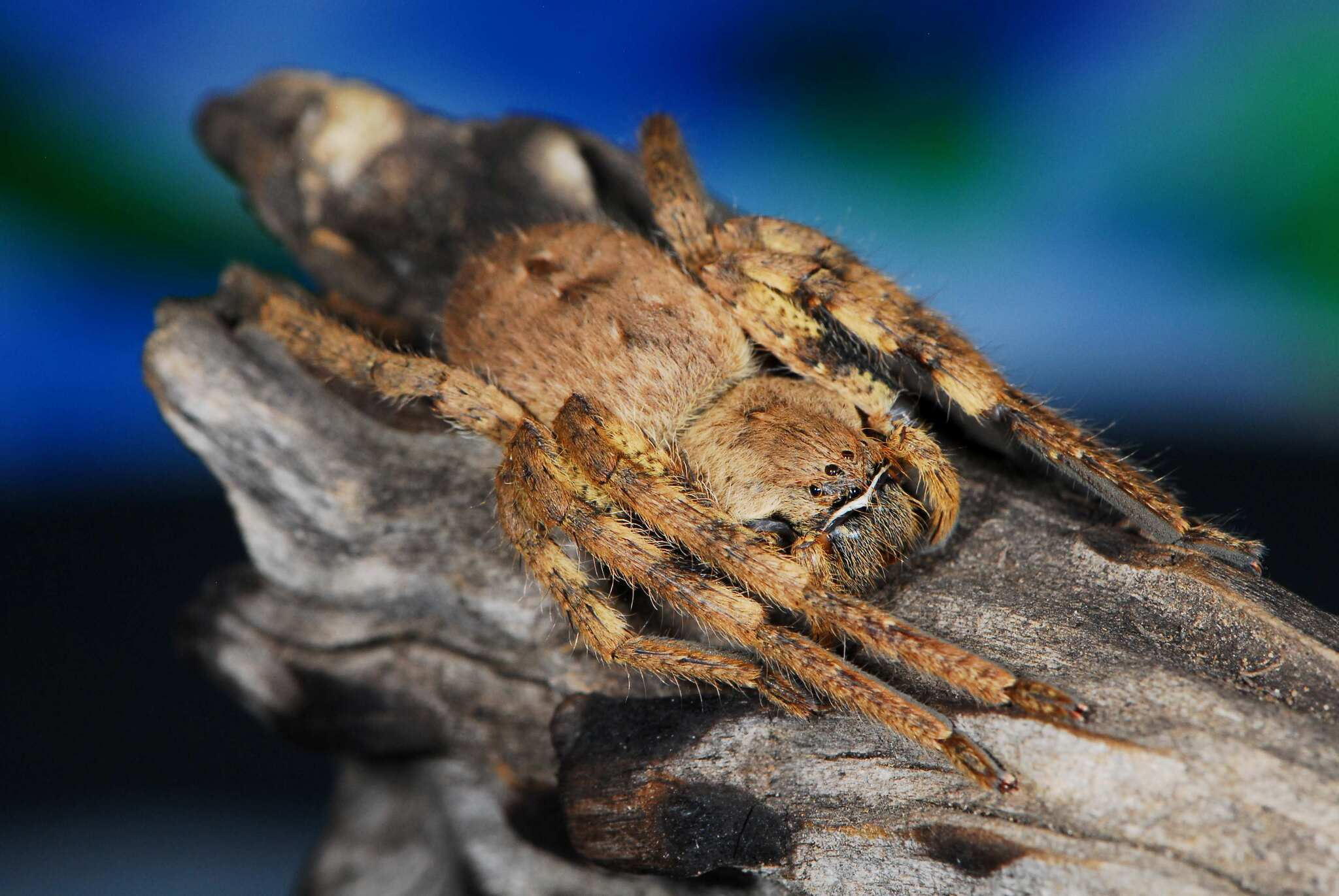
Female from South Africa

== Distribution ==
Palystes superciliosus is recorded from Namibia, Mozambique, Eswatini, and South Africa.

In South Africa, the species has a very wide distribution throughout all provinces and occurs in more than 10 protected areas. Notable locations include Kruger National Park, Ndumo Game Reserve, Polokwane Nature Reserve, De Hoop Nature Reserve, and Swartberg Nature Reserve. The species occurs at altitudes ranging from 1 to 2,785 m.

== Habitat and ecology ==
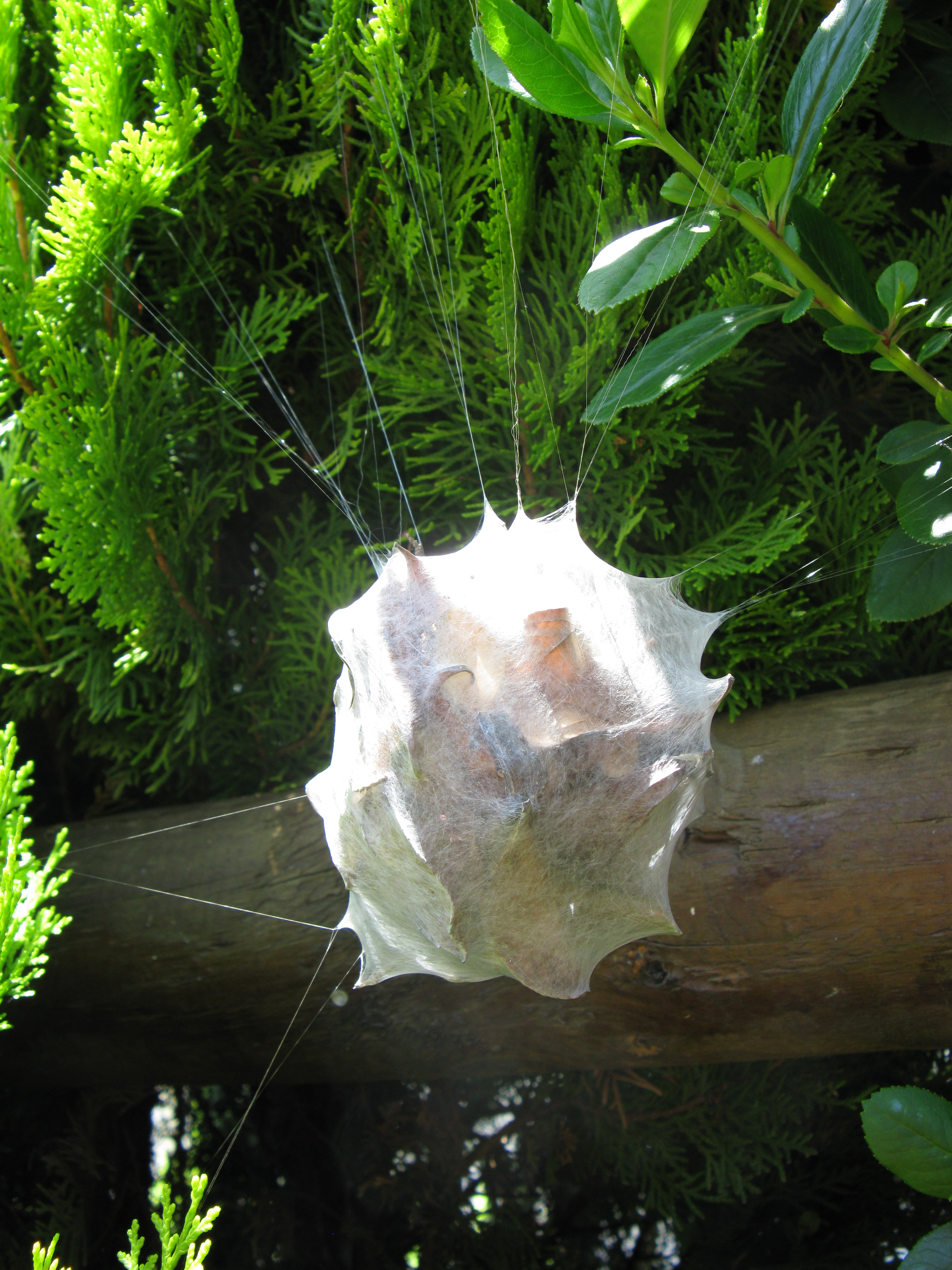
Egg sac of P. castaneus, similar to P. superciliosus

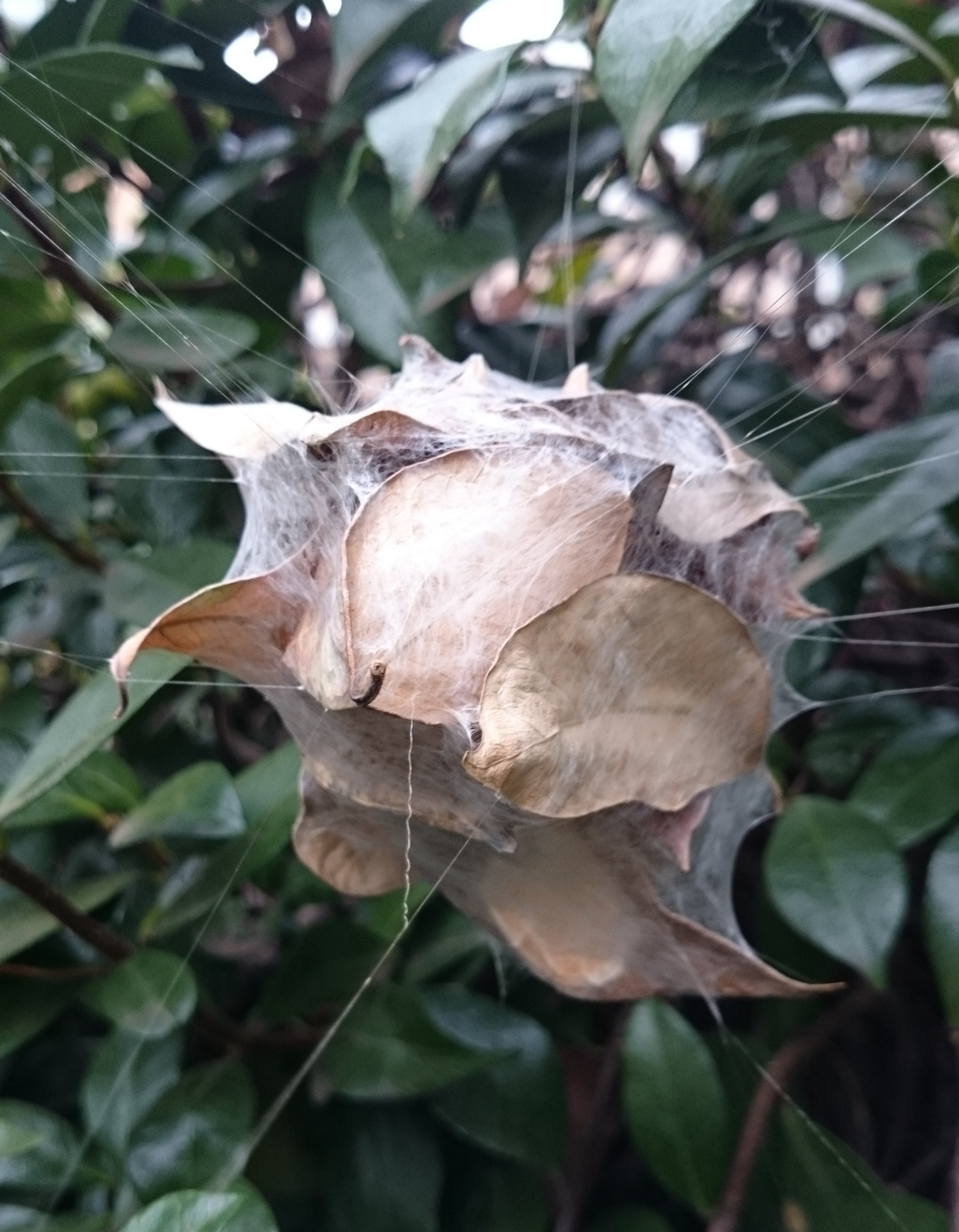
Common Rain Spider egg nest

Palystes superciliosus is a very common species and is commonly found in houses. They usually enter houses before rainy spells. Their large egg sacs are made attached to vegetation. The species has been sampled from all the biomes except the more arid biomes. They were also sampled from cabbage, avocado and macadamia orchards.

Its preferred habitat is scrubland and savannah woodland. Spiders in the genus Palystes are commonly called rain spiders, or lizard-eating spiders. Palystes spiders will often enter homes before rain, where they will prey on geckos (usually Afrogecko porphyreus in Gauteng, the Western Cape, or Lygodactylus capensis in the eastern parts of southern Africa). Males are regularly seen from August to December, probably looking for females.

The legs of these spiders can reach a length of 11 cm, while their bodies alone can reach a length of 4 cm. Interestingly, both sexes of these spiders are roughly the same size. After mating in the early summer, the female constructs a round egg sac about 60–100 mm in size made of silk, with twigs and leaves woven into it. These egg sacs are commonly seen from about November to April. The female constructs the sac over 3–5 hours, then aggressively guards it until the spiderlings, who hatch inside the protective sac, chew their way out about three weeks later. Females will construct about three of these egg sacs over their two-year lives. Many gardeners are bitten by protective Palystes mothers during this period.

The size of these spiders, combined with the yellow and black banding on the underside of the legs exposed when the spider is in threat pose, give them a fearsome appearance. An experiment was done in 1959 where a Palystes superciliosus was allowed to bite an adult guinea pig on the nose. The guinea pig died within 7 minutes, leading to a belief that the spider's venom was dangerous. However, further research on anaesthetized guinea pigs showed that the original guinea pig had actually died of shock, rather than as a result of the spider's venom. In humans the bite is no more dangerous than a bee sting. It causes a burning sensation, and swelling which lasts for a few days. Recovery is spontaneous and complete.

== Description ==
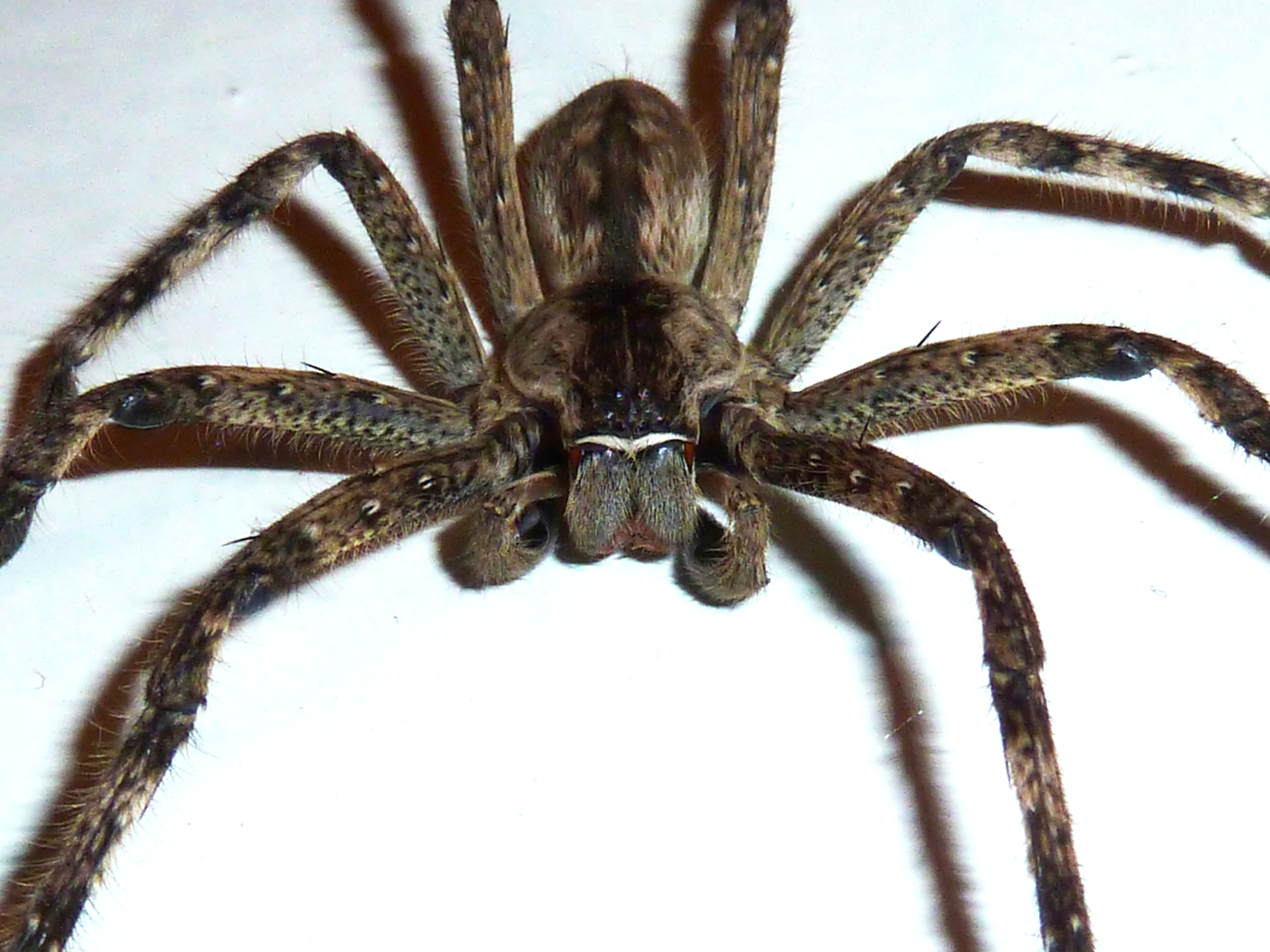
Female P. superciliosus

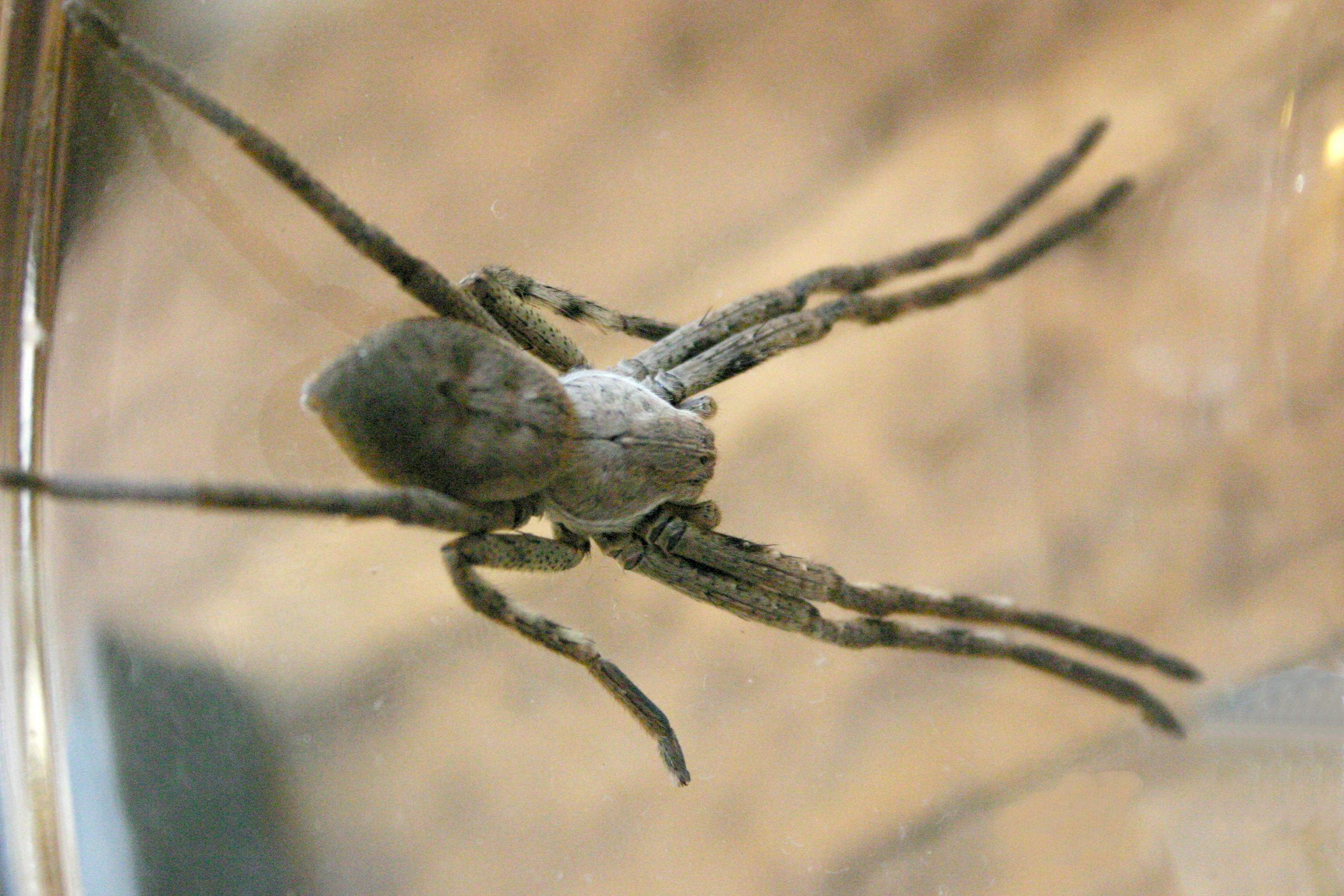
Female P. superciliosus

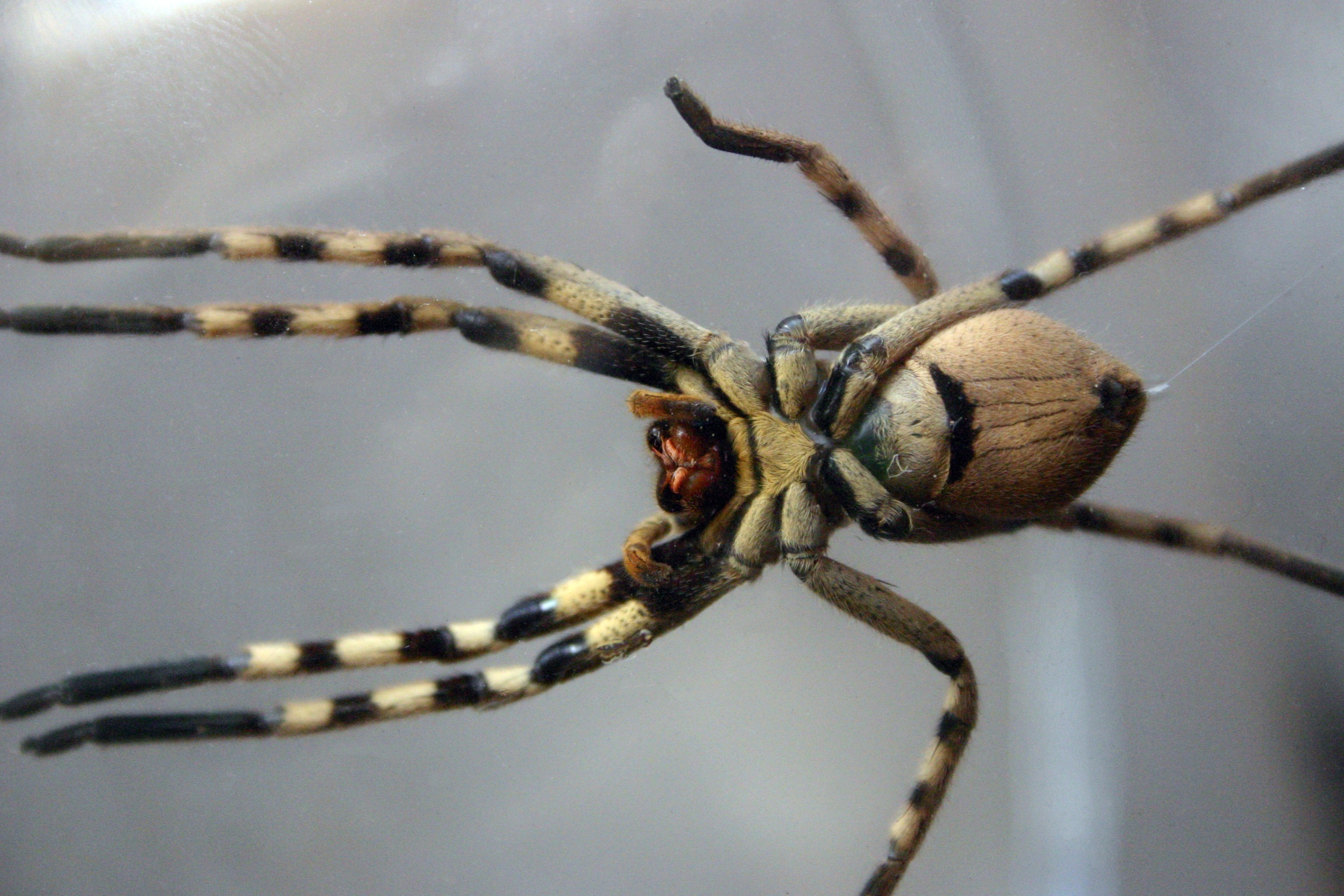
Underside of female P. superciliosus

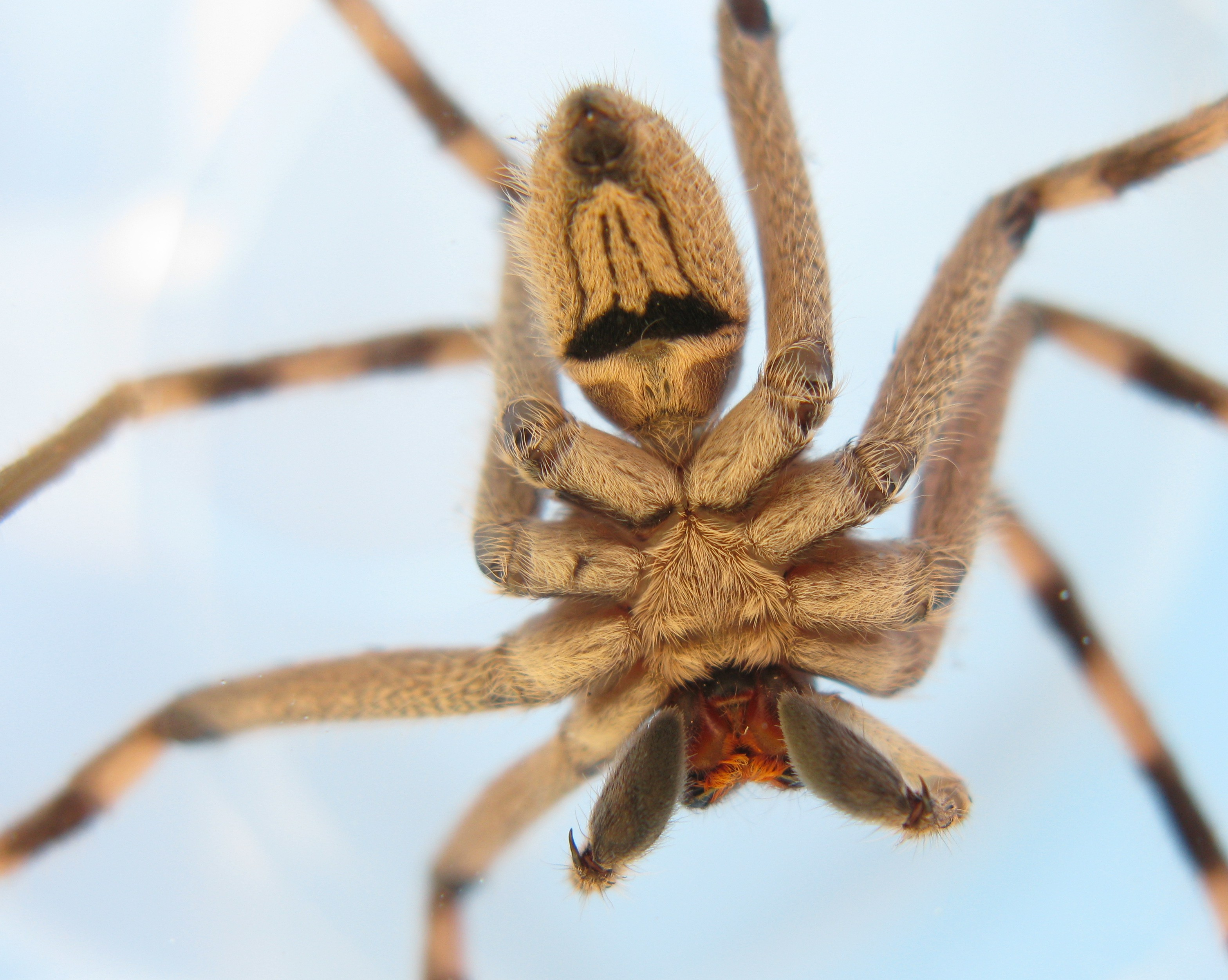
Underside of male P. superciliosus

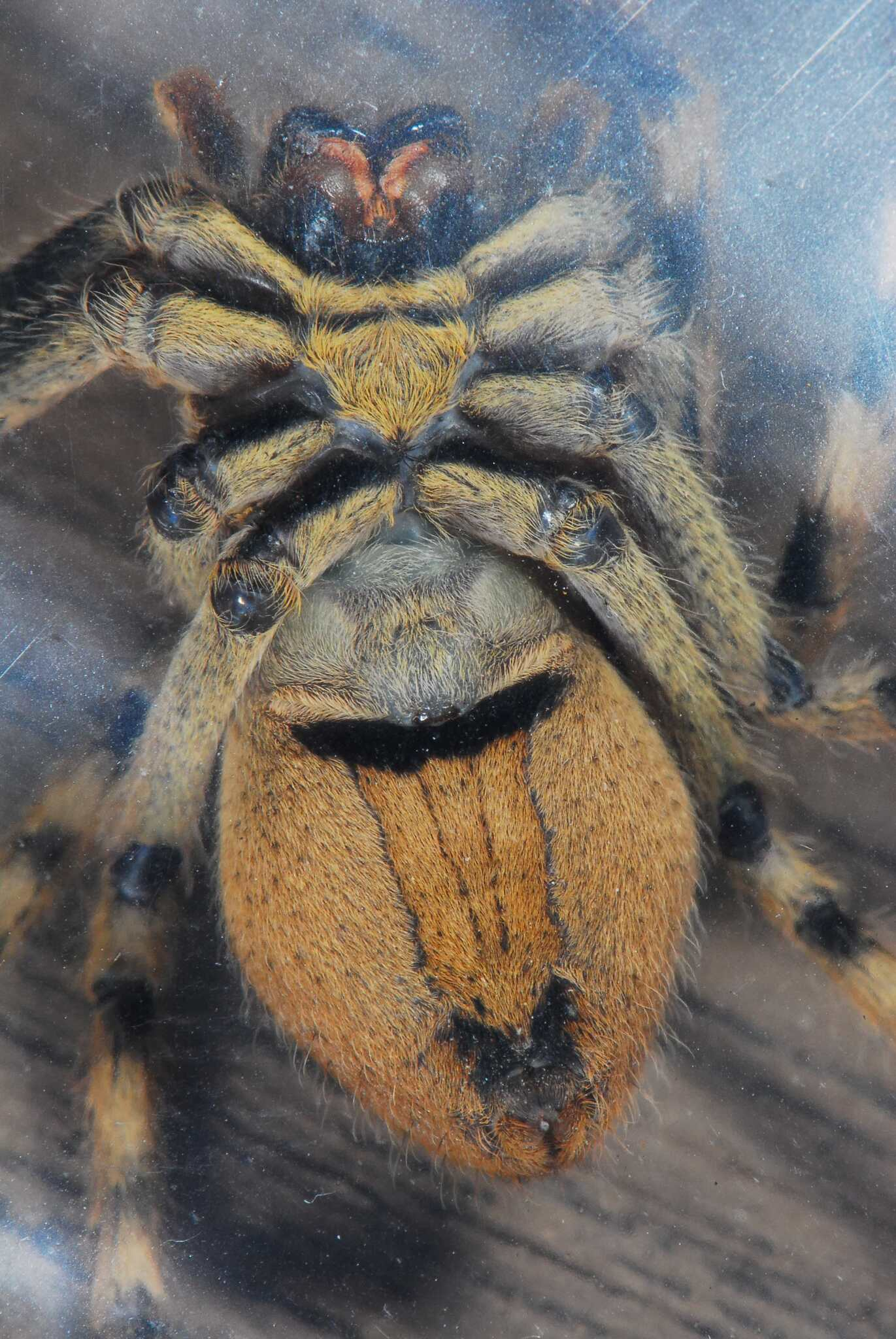
Underside of female

== Wasps ==
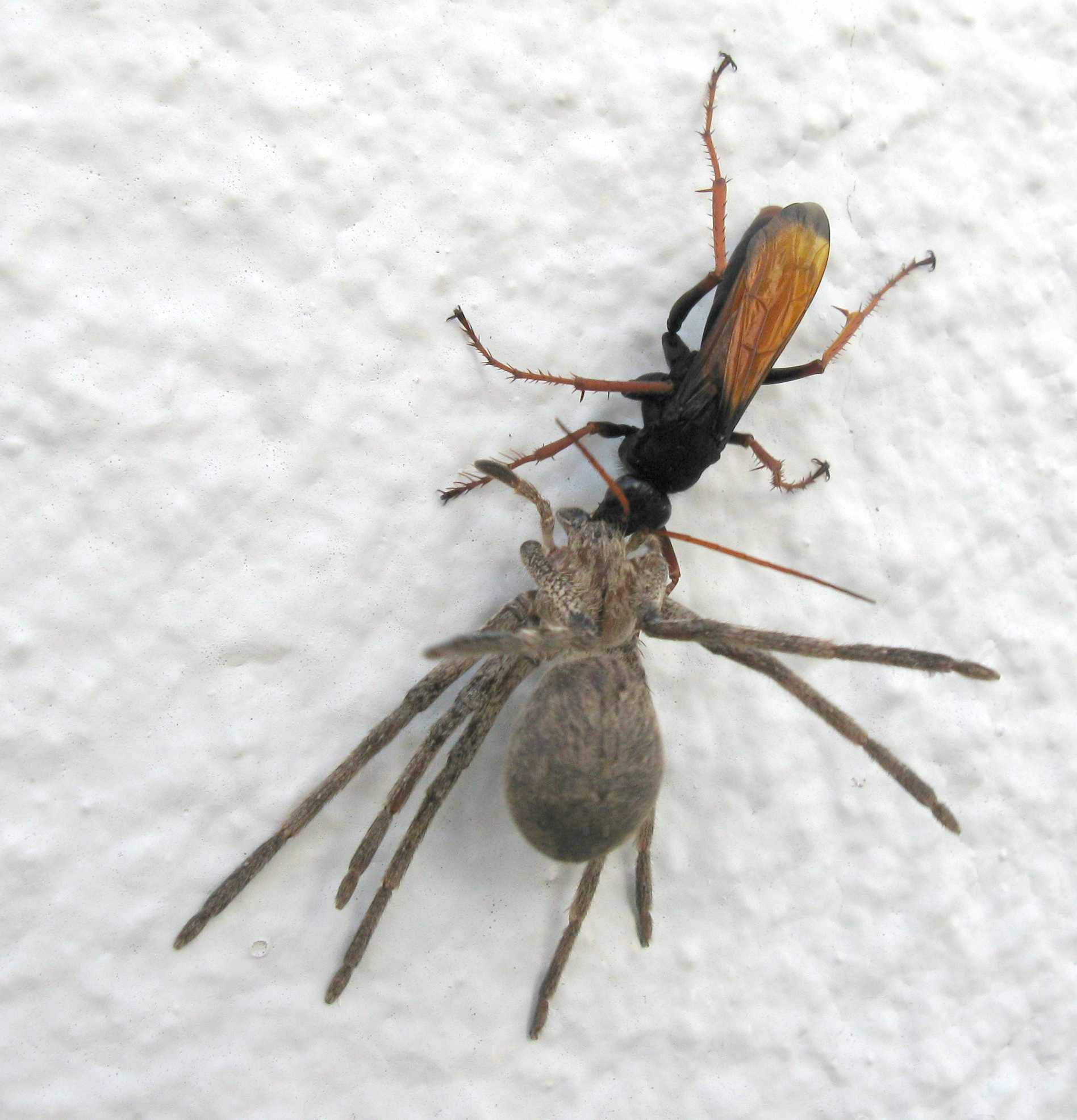
Tachypompilus ignitus dragging Palystes prey up a wall

P. superciliosus (and other Palystes spiders) are also commonly seen paralysed, being dragged by a large wasp called a Pompilid wasp. Sometimes the wasp will not be present. Pompilid wasps only hunt spiders, which they paralyse by stinging them. They then drag the spider back to their nest where they lay an egg on the spider, then seal the spider and the egg in. When the egg hatches, the larva eats the paralysed spider, keeping the spider alive as long as possible by eating peripheral flesh first, and saving the vital organs till last. By doing this, the spider stays fresh long enough for the wasp larva to mature and pupate. The Pompilid wasp species Tachypompilus ignitus is at least largely a specialist hunter of mature Palystes females.
