= Colleter (botany) =

Type of plant structure

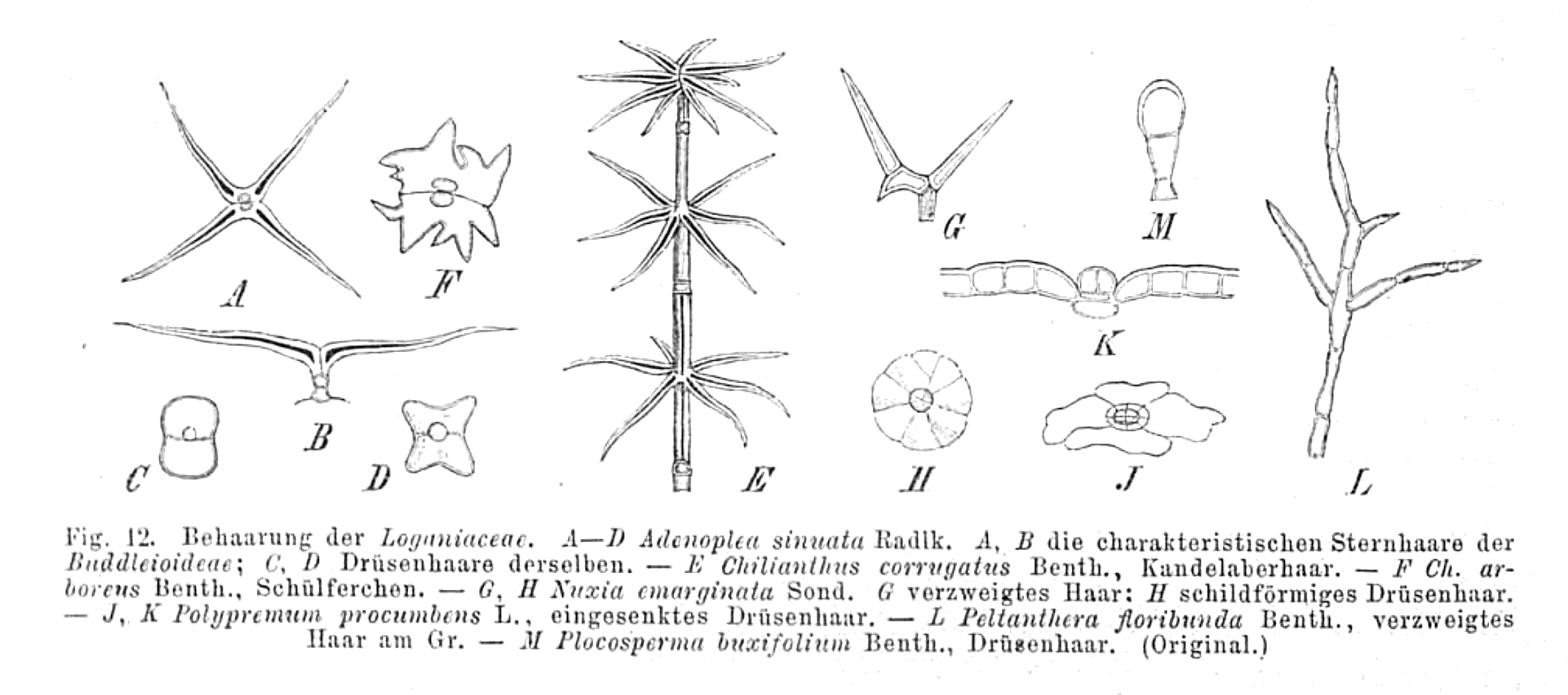
Several hair types occur on plants of Loganiaceae, including multicellular secretory colleters shown here in cross-section (C, D, H).

Colleters are plant structures, multicellular secretory hairs, found in groups near the base of petioles, on stipules, and on sepals. They are found in members of the Loganiaceae and Rubiaceae families.
