= List of spiders of India =

This is a list of the spiders found in India and is based on Siliwal, Molur and Biswas (2005).

== I. Family Agelenidae C.L. Koch, 1837 ==
I.a. Genus Agelena Walckenaer, 1805

1. Agelena barunae Tikader, 1970 Comments: Endemic to India
2. Agelena gautami Tikader, 1962 Comments: Endemic to India
3. Agelena inda Simon, 1897 Comments: Endemic to India
4. Agelena oaklandensis Barman, 1979 Comments: Endemic to India
5. Agelena satmila Tikader, 1970 Comments: Endemic to India
6. Agelena shillongensis Tikader, 1969 Comments: Endemic to India

I.b. Genus Tegenaria Latreille, 1804

1. Tegenaria comstocki Gajbe, 2004 Comments: Endemic to India
2. Tegenaria domestica (Clerck, 1757)
3. Tegenaria hemanginiae Reddy & Patel, 1992 Comments: Endemic to India
4. Tegenaria shillongensis Barman, 1979 Comments: Endemic to India

== II. Family Amaurobiidae Thorell, 1870 ==
II.a. Genus Amaurobius C.L. Koch, 1837

1. Amaurobius andhracus Patel & Reddy, 1990 Comments: Endemic to India
2. Amaurobius indicus Bastawade, 2002 Comments: Endemic to India. Misplaced ?
3. Amaurobius nathabhaii Patel & Patel, 1975 Comments: Endemic to India

II.b. Genus Tamgrinia Lehtinen, 1967

1. Tamgrinia alveolifera (Schenkel, 1936)

== III Family Anyphaenidae Bertkau, 1878 ==
III.a. Genus Anyphaena Sundevall, 1833

1. Anyphaena soricina Simon, 1889 Comments: Endemic to India

== IV Family Araneidae Simon, 1895 ==
IV.a. Genus Arachnura Vinson, 1863

1. Arachnura angura Tikader, 1970 Comments: Endemic to India
2. Arachnura melanura Simon, 1867 Distribution: India to Japan and Sulawesi

IV.b. Genus Araneus Clerck, 1757

1. Araneus anantnagensis Tikader & Bal, 1981 Comments: Endemic to India
2. Araneus bilunifer Pocock, 1900 Comments: Endemic to India
3. Araneus boerneri (Strand, 1907) Comments: Endemic to India
4. a. A. boerneri clavimaculus (Strand, 1907) Comments: Endemic to India
5. b. A. boerneri obscurellus (Strand, 1907) Comments: Endemic to India
6. Araneus camilla (Simon, 1889) Comments: Endemic to India
7. Araneus decentellus (Strand, 1907) Distribution: India, China
8. Araneus ellipticus (Tikader & Bal, 1981)
9. Araneus enucleatus (Karsch, 1879) Distribution: India, Sri Lanka, Myanmar, Sumatra
10. Araneus fulvellus (Roewer, 1942) Distribution: India, Pakistan Comments: Endemic to South Asia.
11. Araneus himalayaensis Tikader, 1975 Distribution: India, China
12. Araneus himalayanus (Simon, 1889) Comments: Endemic to India.
13. Araneus hirsutulus (Stoliczka, 1869) Comments: Endemic to India.
14. Araneus liber (Leardi, 1902) Endemic to India.
15. Araneus minutalis (Simon, 1889) Comments: Endemic to India.
16. Araneus mitificus (Simon, 1886) Distribution: India to Philippines, New Guinea
17. Araneus noegeatus (Thorell, 1895) Distribution: India, Myanmar, Singapore, Sumatra
18. Araneus nympha (Simon, 1889) Distribution: India, Pakistan, China
19. Araneus pahalgaonensis Tikader & Bal, 1981 Distribution: India, China
20. Araneus panchganiensis Tikader & Bal, 1981 Comments: Endemic to India.
21. Araneus sponsus (Thorell, 1887) Comments: Endemic to India.
22. Araneus viridisomus (Gravely, 1921) Comments: Endemic to India.

IV.c. Genus Araniella Chamberlin & Ivie, 1942

1. Araniella cucurbitina (Clerck, 1757) Distribution: Palearctic

IV.d. Genus Argiope Audouin, 1826

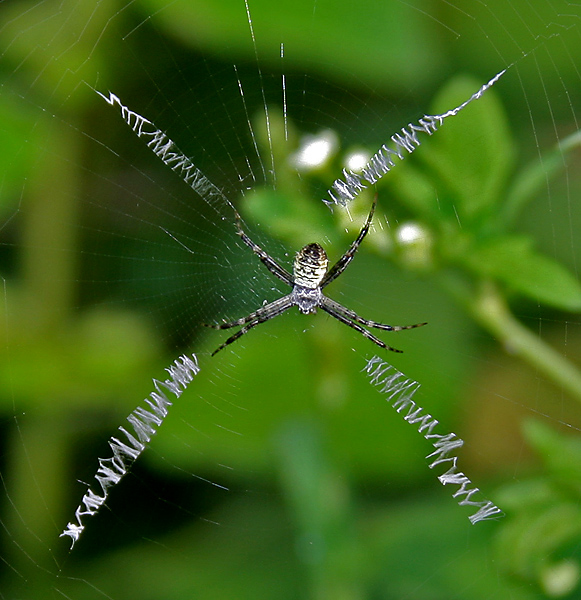
Argiope catenulata

1. Argiope aemula (Walckenaer, 1842) Distribution: India to Philippines, New Hebrides
2. Argiope anasuja Thorell, 1887 Distribution: Pakistan to Maldives Comments: Endemic to South Asia
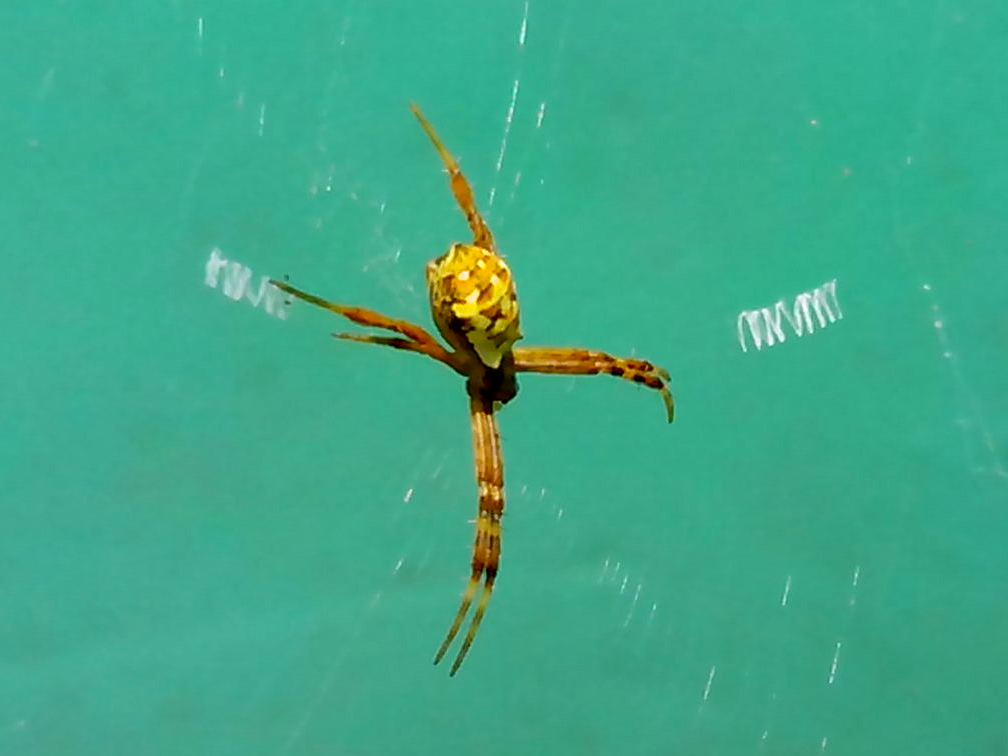
  Argiope anasuja Male Spider
3. Argiope caesarea Thorell, 1897 Distribution: India, Myanmar, China
4. Argiope catenulata (Doleschall, 1859) Distribution: India to Philippines, New Guinea
5. Argiope macrochoera Thorell, 1891 Distribution: India, China
6. Argiope minuta Karsch, 1879 Distribution: India, Bangladesh, East Asia
7. Argiope pulchella Thorell, 1881 Distribution: India to China and Java
8. Argiope lobata (Pallas, 1772) Distribution: Old World
9. Argiope trifasciata (Forskål, 1775) Distribution: Cosmopolitan
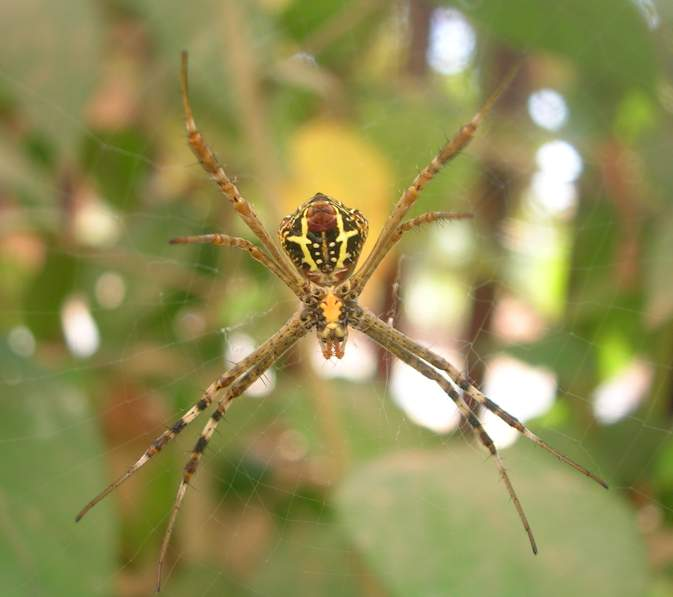
  Argiope pulchella

IV.e. Genus Cercidia Thorell, 1869

1. Cercidia punctigera Simon, 1889 Comments: Endemic to India.

IV.f. Genus Chorizopes O.P.-Cambridge, 1870

1. Chorizopes anjanes Tikader, 1965 Comments: Endemic to India.
2. Chorizopes bengalensis Tikader, 1975 Distribution: India, China
3. Chorizopes calciope (Simon, 1895) Comments: Endemic to India.
4. Chorizopes congener O.P.-Cambridge, 1885 Comments: Endemic to India.
5. Chorizopes khandaricus Gajbe nom. nov. Comments: Endemic to India.
6. Chorizopes kastoni Gajbe & Gajbe, 2004 Comments: Endemic to India.
7. Chorizopes khanjanes Tikader, 1965 Distribution: India, China
8. Chorizopes khedaensis Reddy & Patel, 1993 Comments: Endemic to India.
9. Chorizopes pateli Reddy & Patel, 1993 Comments: Endemic to India.
10. Chorizopes stoliczkae O.P.-Cambridge, 1885 Comments: Endemic to India.
11. Chorizopes tikaderi Sadana & Kaur, 1974 Comments: Endemic to India.

IV.g. Genus Cyclosa Menge, 1866

1. Cyclosa albisternis Simon, 1887 Distribution: India, Hawaii
2. Cyclosa bifida (Doleschall, 1859) Distribution: India to Philippines, New Guinea
3. Cyclosa centrodes (Thorell, 1887) Distribution: India to Singapore
4. Cyclosa confraga (Thorell, 1892) Distribution: India, Bangladesh to Malaysia
5. Cyclosa hexatuberculata Tikader, 1982 Comments: Endemic to India
6. Cyclosa insulana (Costa, 1834) Distribution: Mediterranean to Philippines, Australia
7. Cyclosa micula (Thorell, 1892) Distribution: India, Singapore
8. Cyclosa moonduensis Tikader, 1963 Comments: Endemic to India
9. Cyclosa mulmeinensis (Thorell, 1887) Distribution: Africa to Japan, Philippines
10. Cyclosa neilensis Tikader, 1977 Comment: Endemic to Andaman & Nicobar Islands
11. Cyclosa oatesi (Thorell, 1892) Comments: Endemic to Andaman & Nicobar Islands
12. Cyclosa quinqueguttata (Thorell, 1881) Distribution: India, Bhutan, Myanmar, China, Taiwan
13. Cyclosa simoni Tikader, 1982 Comments: Endemic to India
14. Cyclosa spirifera Simon, 1889 Comments: Endemic to India
15. Cyclosa tuberascens Simon, 1906 Comments: Endemic to India

IV.h. Genus Cyrtarachne Thorell, 1868

1. Cyrtarachne avimerdaria Tikader, 1963 Comments: Endemic to India
2. Cyrtarachne bengalensis Tikader, 1961 Distribution: India, China
3. Cyrtarachne biswamoyi Tikader, 1961 Comments: Endemic to India
4. Cyrtarachne gravelyi Tikader, 1961 Comments: Endemic to India
5. Cyrtarachne inaequalis Thorell, 1895 Distribution: India to Japan
6. Cyrtarachne invenusta Thorell, 1891 Comments: Endemic to Andaman & Nicobar Islands
7. Cyrtarachne promilai Tikader, 1963 Comments: Endemic to India
8. Cyrtarachne raniceps Pocock, 1900 Distribution: India, Sri Lanka Comments: Endemic to South Asia
9. Cyrtarachne schmidi Tikader, 1963 Comments: Endemic to India
10. Cyrtarachne sundari Tikader, 1963 Comments: Endemic to India

IV.i. Genus Cyrtophora Simon, 1864

1. Cyrtophora bidenta Tikader, 1970 Comments: Endemic to India
2. Cyrtophora cicatrosa (Stoliczka, 1869) Distribution: Pakistan to New Guinea
3. Cyrtophora citricola (Forskål, 1775) Distribution: Old World, Hispaniola, Colombia
4. Cyrtophora feai (Thorell, 1887) Distribution: India to Myanmar
5. Cyrtophora jabalpurensis Gajbe & Gajbe, 1999 Comments: Endemic to India
6. Cyrtophora ksudra Sherriffs, 1928 Comments: Endemic to India
7. Cyrtophora moluccensis (Doleschall, 1857) Distribution: India to Japan, Australia

IV.j. Genus Eriovixia Archer, 1951

1. Eriovixia excelsa (Simon, 1889) Distribution: India, Pakistan, Philippines, Indonesia, Taiwan
2. Eriovixia laglaizei (Simon, 1877) Distribution: India, China to Philippines, New Guinea
3. Eriovixia poonaensis (Tikader & Bal, 1981) Distribution: India, China

IV.k. Genus Gasteracantha Sundevall, 1833

1. Gasteracantha cancriformis (Linnaeus, 1758)
2. Gasteracantha cuspidata C. L. Koch, 1837 Distribution: India, Malaysia, Java

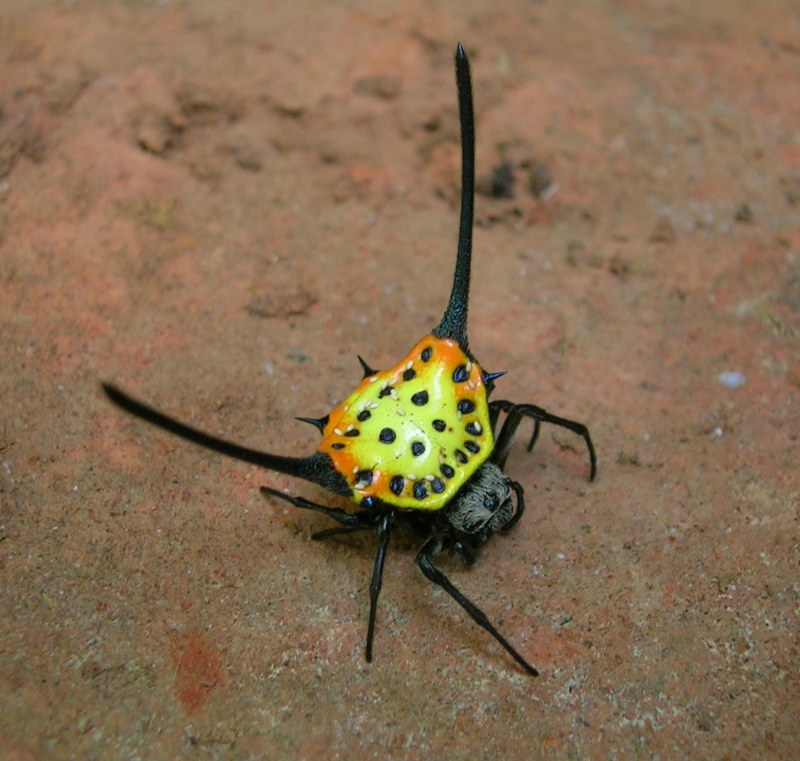
Gasteracantha dalyi

1. Gasteracantha dalyi Pocock, 1900 Distribution: India, Pakistan Comments: Endemic to South Asia
2. Gasteracantha diadesmia Thorell, 1887 Distribution: India to Philippines
3. Gasteracantha frontata Blackwall, 1864 Distribution: India, Myanmar, Thailand, Flores, Borneo
4. Gasteracantha geminata (Fabricius, 1798) Distribution: India, Sri Lanka Comments: Endemic to South Asia
5. Gasteracantha hasselti C.L. Koch, 1837 Distribution: India, China to Moluccas
6. Gasteracantha kuhli C.L. Koch, 1837 Distribution: India to Japan, Philippines

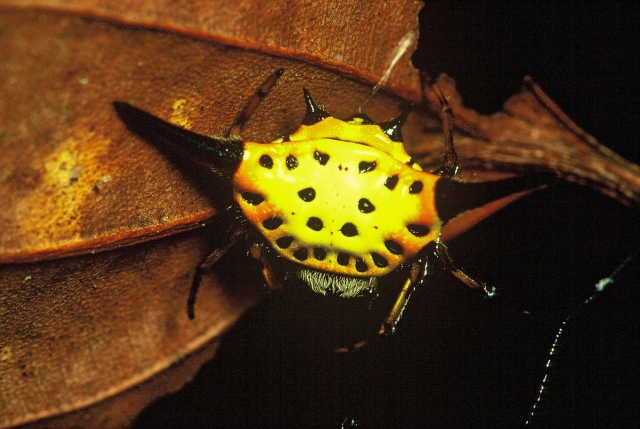
Gasteracantha dalyi

1. Gasteracantha remifera Butler, 1873 Distribution: India, Sri Lanka Comments: Endemic to South Asia
2. Gasteracantha sororna Butler, 1873 Comments: Endemic to India
3. Gasteracantha taeniata (Walckenaer, 1842) Distribution: India to Polynesia
4. Gasteracantha unguifera Simon, 1889 Comments: Endemic to India

IV.l. Genus Gea C.L. Koch, 1843

1. Gea spinipes C.L. Koch, 1843 Distribution: India, China, Taiwan to Borneo
2. Gea subarmata Thorell, 1890 Distribution: India, Bangladesh to Philippines, New Guinea

IV.m. Genus Gibbaranea Archer, 1951

1. Gibbaranea bituberculata (Walckenaer, 1802) Distribution: Palearctic

IV.n. Genus Larinia Simon, 1874

1. Larinia bharatae Bhandari & Gajbe, 2001 Comments: Endemic to India
2. Larinia chloris (Audouin, 1826) Distribution: India, Middle East to Mozambique
3. Larinia emertoni Gajbe & Gajbe, 2004 Comments: Endemic to India
4. Larinia jaysankari Biswas, 1984 Comments: Endemic to India
5. Larinia kanpurae Patel & Nigam, 1994 Comments: Endemic to India
6. Larinia phthisica (L. Koch, 1871) Distribution: Asia, Japan, Philippines, Australia
7. Larinia tyloridia Patel, 1975 Comments: Endemic to India

IV.o. Genus Lipocrea Thorell, 1878

1. Lipocrea fusiformis (Thorell, 1877) Distribution: India to Japan, Philippines, Sulawesi

IV.p. Genus Macracantha Simon, 1864 Comments: It is a monotypic Genus

1. Macracantha arcuata (Fabricius, 1793) Distribution: India, China to Borneo

IV.q. Genus Neogea Levi, 1983

1. Neogea nocticolor (Thorell, 1887) Distribution: India to Sumatra

IV.r. Genus Neoscona Simon, 1864

1. Neoscona achine (Simon, 1906) Distribution: India, China
2. Neoscona bihumpi Patel, 1988 Comments: Endemic to India
3. Neoscona bengalensis Tikader & Bal, 1981 Comments: Endemic to India
4. Neoscona biswasi Bhandari & Gajbe, 2001 Comments: Endemic to India
5. Neoscona chrysanthusi Tikader & Bal, 1981 Distribution: Bhutan, India Comments:Endemic to South Asia
6. Neoscona dhruvai Patel & Nigam, 1994 Comments: Endemic to India
7. Neoscona dhumani Patel & Reddy, 1993 Comments: Endemic to India
8. Neoscona dyali Gajbe, 2004 Comments: Endemic to India
9. Neoscona molemensis Tikader & Bal, 1981 Distribution: Bangladesh, India to Philippines, Indonesia
10. Neoscona mukerjei Tikader, 1980 Comments: Endemic to India
11. Neoscona murthyi Patel & Reddy, 1990 Comments: Endemic to India
12. Neoscona nautica (L. Koch, 1875) Distribution: Cosmotropical
13. Neoscona odites (Simon, 1906) Comments: Endemic to India.
14. Neoscona parambikulamensis Patel, 2003 Comments: Endemic to India
15. Neoscona pavida (Simon, 1906) Distribution: India, China
16. Neoscona platnicki Gajbe & Gajbe, 2001 Comments: Endemic to India
17. Neoscona punctigera (Doleschall, 1857) Distribution: Réunion to Japan
18. Neoscona raydakensis Saha et al., 1995 Comments: Endemic to India
19. Neoscona sanghi Gajbe, 2004 Comments: Endemic to India
20. Neoscona shillongensis Tikader & Bal, 1981 Distribution: India, China
21. Neoscona sinhagadensis (Tikader, 1975) Distribution: India, China
22. Neoscona theisi (Walckenaer, 1842) Distribution: India, China to Pacific Island
23. Neoscona triangula (Keyserling, 1864) Distribution: Cape Verde to India
24. Neoscona ujavalai Reddy & Patel, 1992 Comments: Endemic to India
25. Neoscona vigilans (Blackwall, 1865) Distribution: Africa to Philippines, New Guinea

IV.s. Genus Ordgarius Keyserling, 1886

1. Ordgarius hexapinus Saha & Raychaudhuri, 2004 Comments: Endemic to India
2. Ordgarius hobsoni (O. P.-Cambridge, 1877) Distribution: India, Sri Lanka, China, Japan
3. Ordgarius sexspinosus (Thorell, 1894) Distribution: India to Japan, Indonesia

IV.t. Genus Parawixia F.O.P.-Cambridge, 1904

1. Parawixia dehaanii (Doleschall, 1859) Distribution: India to Philippines, New Guinea

IV.u. Genus Pasilobus Simon, 1895

1. Pasilobus kotigeharus Tikader, 1963 Comments: Endemic to India

IV.v. Genus Poltys C.L. Koch, 1843

1. Poltys bhabanii (Tikader, 1970) Comments: Endemic to India.
2. Poltys bhavnagarensis Patel, 1988 Comments: Endemic to India
3. Poltys illepidus C. L. Koch, 1843 Distribution: India to Philippines, Australia
4. Poltys nagpurensis Tikader, 1982 Comments: Endemic to India
5. Poltys pogonias Thorell, 1891 Comments: Endemic to Andaman and Nicobar Islands

IV.w. Genus Prasonica Simon, 1895

1. Prasonica insolens (Simon, 1909) Distribution: India, Vietnam, Java

IV.x. Genus Singa C. L. Koch, 1836

1. Singa haddooensis Tikader, 1977 Comments: Endemic to Andaman & Nicobar Islands
2. Singa chota Tikader, 1970 Comments: Endemic to India
3. Singa myrrhea (Simon, 1895) Comments: Endemic to India.

IV.y. Genus Thelacantha Hasselt, 1882 Comments: It is a monotypic genus.

1. Thelacantha brevispina (Doleschall, 1857) Distribution: India to Philippines, Madagascar, Australia

IV.z. Genus Zilla C. L. Koch, 1834

1. Zilla globosa Saha & Raychaudhuri, 2004 Comments: Endemic to India

IV.aa. Genus Zygiella F.O.P.-Cambridge, 1902

1. Zygiella indica Tikader & Bal, 1980 Comments: Endemic to India
2. Zygiella shivui Patel & Reddy, 1990 Comments: Endemic to India

== V Family Atypidae Thorell, 1870 ==
V.a. Genus Atypus Latreille, 1804

1. Atypus sutherlandi Chennappaiya, 1935 Comments: Endemic to India

== VI Family Barychelidae Simon, 1889 ==
VI.a. Genus Diplothele O. P.-Cambridge, 1890 Comments: Endemic to South Asia

1. Diplothele walshi O. P.-Cambridge, 1890 Comments: Endemic to India

VI.b. Genus Sason Simon, 1887

1. Sason andamanicum Simon, 1888 Comments: Endemic Andaman & Nicobar Islands
2. Sason robustum (O. P.-Cambridge, 1883) Distribution: India, Sri Lanka, Seychelles

VI.c. Genus Sasonichus Pocock, 1900 Comments: Monotypic Genus and endemic to India.

1. Sasonichus sullivani Pocock, 1900 Comments: Endemic to India

VI.d. Genus Sipalolasma Simon, 1892

1. . Sipalolasma arthrapophysis (Gravely, 1915) Comments: Endemic to India.

== VII Family Cithaeronidae Simon, 1893 ==
VII.a. Genus Cithaeron O. P.-Cambridge, 1872

1. Cithaeron indicus Platnick & Gajbe, 1994 Comments: Endemic to India

VII.b. Genus Inthaeron Platnick, 1991 Comments: Monotypic Genus and endemic to India.

1. Inthaeron rossi Platnick, 1991 Comments: Endemic to India

== VIII Family Clubionidae Wagner, 1887 ==
VIII.a. Genus Clubiona Latreille, 1804

1. Clubiona acanthocnemis Simon, 1906 Comments: Endemic to India
2. Clubiona analis Thorell, 1895 Distribution: India, Bangladesh, Myanmar
3. Clubiona bengalensis Biswas, 1984 Comments: Endemic to India
4. Clubiona boxaensis Biswas & Biswas, 1992 Comments: Endemic to India
5. Clubiona chakrabartei Majumder & Tikader, 1991 Comments: Endemic to India.
6. Clubiona crouxi Caporiacco, 1935 Comments: Endemic to India
7. Clubiona deletrix O. P.-Cambridge, 1885 Distribution: India, China, Taiwan, Japan
8. Clubiona drassodes O. P.-Cambridge, 1874 Distribution: India, Bangladesh, China
9. Clubiona filicata O. P.-Cambridge, 1874 Distribution: India, Bangladesh, China
10. Clubiona hysgina Simon, 1889 Comments: Endemic to India
11. Clubiona ludhianaensis Tikader, 1976 Distribution: India, Bangladesh Comments: Endemic to South Asia
12. Clubiona nicobarensis Tikader, 1977 Comments: Endemic to Andaman & Nocobar Islands
13. Clubiona nilgherina Simon, 1906 Comments: Endemic to India
14. Clubiona pashabhaii Patel & Patel, 1973 Comments: Endemic to India
15. Clubiona pogonias Simon, 1906 Comments: Endemic to India
16. Clubiona shillongensis Majumder & Tikader, 1991 Comments: Endemic to India
17. Clubiona submaculata (Thorell, 1891) Comments: Endemic to Andaman & Nicobar Islands.
18. Clubiona tikaderi Majumder & Tikader, 1991 Comments: Endemic to India.

VIII.b. Genus Matidia Thorell, 1878

1. Matidia incurvata Reimoser, 1934 Comments: Endemic to India

VIII.c. Genus Simalio Simon, 1897

1. Simalio aurobindoi Patel & Reddy, 1991 Comments: Endemic to India
2. Simalio biswasi Majumder & Tikader, 1991 Comments: Endemic to India
3. Simalio castaneiceps Simon, 1906 Comments: Endemic to India
4. Simalio percomis Simon, 1906 Comments: Endemic to India

== IX. Family Corinnidae Karsch, 1880 ==
IX.a. Genus Aetius O.P.-Cambridge, 1896

1. Aetius decollatus O.P.-Cambridge, 1896 Distribution: India, Sri Lanka Comments: Endemic to South Asia

IX.b. Genus Apochinomma Pavesi, 1881

1. Apochinomma dolosum Simon, 1897 Comments: Endemic to India.
2. Apochinomma nitidum (Thorell, 1895) Distribution: India, Myanmar, Thailand, Borneo, Sulawesi

IX.c. Genus Castianeira Keyserling, 1879

1. Castianeira adhartali Gajbe, 2003 Comments: Endemic to India
2. Castianeira albopicta Gravely, 1931 Comments: Endemic to India.
3. Castianeira bengalensis Biswas, 1984 Comments: Endemic to India.
4. Castianeira flavipes Gravely, 1931 Comments: Endemic to India
5. Castianeira himalayensis Gravely, 1931 Comments: Endemic to India.
6. Castianeira indica Tikader, 1981 Comments: Endemic to India.
7. Castianeira quadrimaculata Reimoser, 1934 Comments: Endemic to India.
8. Castianeira tinae Patel & Patel, 1973 Distribution: India, China
9. Castianeira zetes Simon, 1897 Distribution: India, Bangladesh, Comments: Endemic to South Asia.

IX.d. Genus Coenoptychus Simon, 1885 Comments: Monotypic Genus endemic to South Asia.

1. Coenoptychus pulcher Simon, 1885 Distribution: India, Sri Lanka Comments: Endemic to South Asia

IX.e. Genus Corinnomma Karsch, 1880

1. Corinnomma comulatum Thorell, 1891 Comments: Endemic to Andaman & Nicobar Islands
2. Corinnomma rufofuscum Reimoser, 1934 Comments: Endemic to India
3. Corinnomma severum (Thorell, 1877) Distribution: India to China, Philippines, Sulawesi

IX.f. Genus Creugas Thorell, 1878

1. Creugas gulosus (Thorell, 1878) Distribution: Cosmopolitan

IX.g. Genus Oedignatha Thorell, 1881

1. Oedignatha albofasciata Strand, 1907 Comments: Endemic to India
2. Oedignatha andamanensis (Tikader, 1977) Comments: Endemic to Andaman & Nicobar Islands.
3. Oedignatha binoyii Reddy & Patel, 1993 Comments: Endemic to India
4. Oedignatha carli Reimoser, 1934 Comments: Endemic to India
5. Oedignatha dentifera Reimoser, 1934 Comments: Endemic to India
6. Oedignatha escheri Reimoser, 1934 Comments: Endemic to India
7. Oedignatha indica Reddy & Patel, 1993 Comments: Endemic to India
8. Oedignatha lesserti Reimoser, 1934 Comments: Endemic to India
9. Oedignatha microscutata Reimoser, 1934 Comments: Endemic to India
10. Oedignatha poonaensis Majumder & Tikader, 1991 Comments: Endemic to India
11. Oedignatha procerula Simon, 1897 Comments: Endemic to India.
12. Oedignatha scrobiculata Thorell, 1881 Distribution: India to Philippines
13. Oedignatha shillongensis Biswas & Majumder, 1995 Comments: Endemic to India
14. Oedignatha tricuspidata Reimoser, 1934 Comments: Endemic to India
15. Oedignatha uncata Reimoser, 1934 Comments: Endemic to India

IX.h. Genus Trachelas L. Koch, 1872

1. Trachelas himalayensis Biswas, 1993 Comments: Endemic to India
2. Trachelas oreophilus Simon, 1906 Distribution: India, Sri Lanka Comments: Endemic to South Asia

IX.i. Genus Utivarachna Kishida, 1940

1. Utivarachna fronto (Simon, 1906) Comments: Endemic to India.

== X Family Cryptothelidae L. Koch, 1872 ==
X.a. Genus Cryptothele L. Koch, 1872

1. Cryptothele collina Pocock, 1901 Comments: Endemic to India

== XI Family Ctenidae Keyserling, 1877 ==
XI.a. Genus Acantheis Thorell, 1891

1. Acantheis indicus Gravely, 1931 Comments: Endemic to India

XI.b. Genus Ctenus Walckenaer, 1805

1. Ctenus andamanensis Gravely, 1931 Comments: Endemic to India
2. Ctenus bomdilaensis Tikader & Malhotra, 1981 Comments: Endemic to India
3. Ctenus cochinensis Gravely, 1931 Comments: Endemic to India
4. Ctenus corniger F. O. P.-Cambridge, 1898 Comments: Endemic to India
5. Ctenus dangsus Reddy & Patel, 1994 Comments: Endemic to India
6. Ctenus himalayensis Gravely, 1931 Comments: Endemic to India
7. Ctenus indicus Gravely, 1931 Comments: Endemic to India
8. Ctenus kapuri Tikader, 1973 Comments: Endemic to Andaman & Nicobar Isles
9. Ctenus meghalayaensis Tikader, 1976 Comments: Endemic to India
10. Ctenus narashinhai Patel & Reddy, 1988 Comments: Endemic to India
11. Ctenus sikkimensis Gravely, 1931 Comments: Endemic to India
12. Ctenus smythiesi Simon, 1897 Comments: Endemic to India
13. Ctenus tuniensis Patel & Reddy, 1988 Comments: Endemic to India

== XII Family Ctenizidae Thorell, 1887 ==
XII.a. Genus Latouchia Pocock, 1901

1. Latouchia cryptica (Simon, 1897) Comments: Endemic to India.

== XIII Family Deinopidae C. L. Koch, 1850 ==
XIII.a. Genus Deinopis MacLeay, 1839

1. Deinopis goalparaensis Tikader & Malhotra, 1978 Comments: Endemic to India

== XIV Family Desidae Pocock, 1895 ==
XIV.a. Genus Desis Walckenaer, 1837

1. Desis gardineri Pocock, 1904 Comments: Endemic to Laccadive Island
2. Desis inermis Gravely, 1927 Comments: Endemic to India

== XV Family Dictynidae O.P.-cambridge, 1871 ==
XV.a. Genus Ajmonia Caporiacco, 1934

1. Ajmonia velifera (Simon, 1906) Distribution: India to China

XV.b. Genus Anaxibia Thorell, 1898

1. Anaxibia rebai (Tikader, 1966) Comments: Endemic to India.

XV.c. Genus Argenna Thorell, 1870

1. Argenna patula (Simon, 1874) Distribution: Palearctic

XV.d. Genus Dictyna Sundevall, 1833

1. Dictyna albida O. P.-Cambridge, 1885 Distribution: India, China
2. Dictyna turbida Simon, 1905 Distribution: India, Sri Lanka Comments: Endemic to South Asia.
3. Dictyna umai Tikader, 1966 Comments: Endemic to India.

XV.e. Genus Dictynomorpha Spassky, 1939

1. Dictynomorpha bedeshai (Tikader, 1966) Comments: Endemic to India.
2. Dictynomorpha marakata (Sherriffs, 1927) Comments: Endemic to India.

XV.f. Genus Lathys Simon, 1884

1. Lathys stigmatisata (Menge, 1869) Distribution: Palearctic

XV.g. Genus Nigma Lehtinen, 1967

1. Nigma shiprai (Tikader, 1966) Comments: Endemic to India.

XV.h. Genus Sudesna Lehtinen, 1967

1. Sudesna grossa (Simon, 1906) Comments: Endemic to India.

== XVI. Family Dipluridae Simon, 1889 ==
XVI.a. Genus Indothele Coyle, 1995 Comments: Endemic to South Asia.

1. Indothele dumicola (Pocock, 1900)
2. Indothele mala Coyle, 1995 Comments: Endemic to India
3. Indothele rothi Coyle, 1995 Comments: Endemic to India

XVI.b. Genus Ischnothele Ausserer, 1875

1. Ischnothele indicola Tikader, 1969 Comments: Endemic to India.

== XVII Family Eresidae C.L. Koch, 1851 ==
XVII.a. Genus Stegodyphus Simon, 1873

1. Stegodyphus mirandus Pocock, 1899 Comments: Endemic to India
2. Stegodyphus pacificus Pocock, 1900 Distribution: India, Iran, Pakistan
3. Stegodyphus sarasinorum Karsch, 1891 Distribution: India, Sri Lanka, Nepal Comments: Endemic to South Asia
4. Stegodyphus tibialis (O.P.-Cambridge, 1869) Distribution: India, Myanmar, Thailand

== XVIII Family Filistatidae Ausserer, 1867 ==
XVIII.a. Genus Filistata Latreille, 1810

1. Filistata chiardolae Caporiacco, 1934 Comments: Endemic to India.
2. Filistata napadensis Patel, 1975 Comments: Endemic to India.
3. Filistata rufa Caporiacco, 1934 Comments: Endemic to India.
4. Filistata seclusa O.P.-Cambridge, 1885 Distribution: India, China

XVIII.b. Genus Pritha Lehtinen, 1967

1. Pritha dharmakumarsinhjii Patel, 1978 Comments: Endemic to India
2. Pritha insularis (Thorell, 1881) Comments: Endemic to Andaman & Nicobar Islands.
3. Pritha nicobarensis (Tikader, 1977) Comments: Endemic to Andaman & Nicobar Islands.
4. Pritha poonaensis (Tikader, 1963) Comments: Endemic to India.

XVIII.c. Genus Sahastata Benoit, 1968

1. Sahastata ashapuriae Patel, 1978 Comments: Endemic to India
2. Sahastata nigra (Simon, 1897) Distribution: Mediterranean to India

== XIX Family Gnaphosidae Pocock, 1898 ==
XIX.a. Genus Apodrassodes Vellard, 1924

1. Apodrassodes yogeshi Gajbe, 1993 Comments: Endemic to India.

XIX.b. Genus Callilepis Westring, 1874

1. Callilepis chakanensis Tikader, 1982 Comments: Endemic to India
2. Callilepis ketani Gajbe, 1984 Comments: Endemic to India
3. Callilepis lambai Tikader & Gajbe, 1977 Comments: Endemic to India
4. Callilepis pawani Gajbe, 1984 Comments: Endemic to India
5. Callilepis rajani Gajbe, 1984 Comments: Endemic to India
6. Callilepis rajasthanica Tikader & Gajbe, 1977 Comments: Endemic to India
7. Callilepis rukminiae Tikader & Gajbe, 1977 Comments: Endemic to India

XIX.c. Genus Camillina Berland, 1919

1. Camillina smythiesi (Simon, 1897)

XIX.d. Genus Drassodes Westring, 1851

1. Drassodes andamanensis Tikader, 1977 Comments: Endemic Andaman & Nicobar Islands
2. Drassodes astrologus (O.P.-Cambridge, 1874) Comments: Endemic to India
3. Drassodes cambridgei Roewer, 1951 Comments: Endemic to India.
4. Drassodes carinivulvus Caporiacco, 1934 Comments: Endemic to India
5. Drassodes cerinus Simon, 1897 Comments: Endemic to India
6. Drassodes delicatus (Blackwall, 1867) Comments: Endemic to India
7. Drassodes deoprayagensis Tikader & Gajbe, 1975 Comments: Endemic to India
8. Drassodes gangeticus Tikader & Gajbe, 1975 Comments: Endemic to India
9. Drassodes gujaratensis Patel & Patel, 1975 Comments: Endemic to India
10. Drassodes heterophthalmus Simon, 1905 Comments: Endemic to India
11. Drassodes himalayensis Tikader & Gajbe, 1975 Comments: Endemic to India.
12. Drassodes luridus (O.P.-Cambridge, 1874) Comments: Endemic to India
13. Drassodes macilentus (O.P.-Cambridge, 1874) Comments: Endemic to India
14. Drassodes maindroni Simon, 1897 Distribution: Oman, India
15. Drassodes meghalayaensis Tikader & Gajbe, 1977 Comments: Endemic to India
16. Drassodes parvidens Caporiacco, 1934 Distribution: India, Pakistan Comments:Endemic to South Asia
17. Drassodes pashanensis Tikader & Gajbe, 1977 Distribution: India, China
18. Drassodes rubicundulus Caporiacco, 1934 Distribution: India, Pakistan Comments: Endemic to South Asia
19. Drassodes sagarensis Tikader, 1982 Comments: Endemic to India
20. Drassodes singulariformis Roewer, 1951 Comments: Endemic to India.
21. Drassodes sirmourensis (Tikader & Gajbe, 1977) Distribution: India, China
22. Drassodes sitae Tikader & Gajbe, 1975 Comments: Endemic to India.
23. Drassodes tikaderi (Gajbe, 1987) Comments: Endemic to India.
24. Drassodes villosus (Thorell, 1856) Distribution: Palearctic
25. Drassodes viveki (Gajbe, 1992) Comments: Endemic to India.

XIX.e. Genus Drassyllus Chamberlin, 1922

1. Drassyllus khajuriai Tikader & Gajbe, 1976 Comments: Endemic to India
2. Drassyllus mahabalei Tikader, 1982 Comments: Endemic to India
3. Drassyllus platnicki Gajbe, 1987 Comments: Endemic to India
4. Drassyllus ratnagiriensis Tikader & Gajbe, 1976 Comments: Endemic to India

XIX.f. Genus Echemus Simon, 1878

1. Echemus chaperi Simon, 1885 Comments: Endemic to India
2. Echemus viveki Gajbe, 1989 Comments: Endemic to India

XIX.g. Genus Eilica Keyserling, 1891

1. Eilica kandarpae Nigam & Patel, 1996 Comments: Endemic to India
2. Eilica platnicki Tikader & Gajbe, 1977 Comments: Endemic to India
3. Eilica songadhensis Patel, 1988 Comments: Endemic to India
4. Eilica tikaderi Platnick, 1976 Comments: Endemic to India

XIX.h. Genus Gnaphosa Latreille, 1804

1. Gnaphosa jodhpurensis Tikader & Gajbe, 1977 Comments: Endemic to India
2. Gnaphosa kailana Tikader, 1966 Comments: Endemic to India
3. Gnaphosa pauriensis Tikader & Gajbe, 1977 Comments: Endemic to India
4. Gnaphosa poonaensis Tikader, 1973 Comments: Endemic to India
5. Gnaphosa rohtakensis Gajbe, 1992 Comments: Endemic to India
6. Gnaphosa stoliczkai O.P.-Cambridge, 1885 Distribution: India, China

XIX.i. Genus Haplodrassus Chamberlin, 1922

1. Haplodrassus ambalaensis Gajbe, 1992 Comments: Endemic to India
2. Haplodrassus bengalensis Gajbe, 1992 Comments: Endemic to India
3. Haplodrassus chotanagpurensis Gajbe, 1987 Comments: Endemic to India
4. Haplodrassus dumdumensis Tikader, 1982 Comments: Endemic to India
5. Haplodrassus jacobi Gajbe, 1992 Comments: Endemic to India
6. Haplodrassus morosus (O. P.-Cambridge, 1872) Distribution: India, Israel
7. Haplodrassus sataraensis Tikader & Gajbe, 1977 Comments: Endemic to India
8. Haplodrassus tehriensis Tikader & Gajbe, 1977 Comments: Endemic to India

XIX.j. Genus Herpyllus Hentz, 1832

1. Herpyllus calcuttaensis Biswas, 1984 Comments: Endemic to India
2. Herpyllus goaensis Tikader, 1982 Comments: Endemic to India

XIX.k. Genus Ladissa Simon, 1907

1. Ladissa inda (Simon, 1897) Comments: Endemic to India
2. Ladissa latecingulata Simon, 1907 Comments: Endemic to India

XIX.l. Genus Megamyrmaekion Wider, 1834

1. Megamyrmaekion ashae Tikader & Gajbe, 1977 Comments: Endemic to India
2. Megamyrmaekion jodhpurense Gajbe, 1993 Comments: Endemic to India
3. Megamyrmaekion kajalae Biswas & Biswas, 1992 Comments: Endemic to India.

XIX.m. Genus Micaria Westring, 1851

1. Micaria faltana Bhattacharya, 1935 Comments: Endemic to India

XIX.n. Genus Nodocion Chamberlin, 1922

1. Nodocion solanensis Tikader & Gajbe, 1977 Comments: Endemic to India
2. Nodocion tikaderi (Gajbe, 1992) Comments: Endemic to India.

XIX.o. Genus Nomisia Dalmas, 1921

1. Nomisia harpax (O.P.-Cambridge, 1874) Comments: Endemic to India.

XIX.p. Genus Odontodrassus Jézéquel, 1965

1. Odontodrassus mundulus (O. P.-Cambridge, 1872) Distribution: India, Tunisia to Israel

XIX.q. Genus Phaeocedus Simon, 1893

1. Phaeocedus haribhaiius Patel & Patel, 1975 Comments: Endemic to India
2. Phaeocedus nicobarensis Tikader, 1977 Comments: Endemic to Andaman & Nicobar Islands
3. Phaeocedus poonaensis Tikader, 1982 Comments: Endemic to India

XIX.r. Genus Poecilochroa Westring, 1874

1. Poecilochroa barmani Tikader, 1982 Comments: Endemic to India
2. Poecilochroa behni Thorell, 1891 Comments: Endemic to Andaman & Nicobar Islands
3. Poecilochroa devendrai Gajbe & Rane, 1985 Comments: Endemic to India
4. Poecilochroa sedula (Simon, 1897) Comments: Endemic to India
5. Poecilochroa tikaderi Patel, 1989 Comments: Endemic to India

XIX.s. Genus Pterotricha Kulczyn’ski, 1903

1. Pterotricha tikaderi Gajbe, 1983 Comments: Endemic to India

XIX.t. Genus Scopoides Platnick, 1989

1. Scopoides kuljitae (Tikader, 1982) Comments: Endemic to India.
2. Scopoides maitraiae (Tikader & Gajbe, 1977) Comments: Endemic to India.
3. Scopoides pritiae (Tikader, 1982) Comments: Endemic to India.
4. Scopoides tikaderi (Gajbe, 1987) Comments: Endemic to India.

XIX.u. Genus Scotophaeus Simon, 1893

1. Scotophaeus bharatae Gajbe, 1989 Comments: Endemic to India
2. Scotophaeus blackwalli (Thorell, 1871) Distribution: Cosmopolitan
3. Scotophaeus domesticus Tikader, 1962 Distribution: India, China
4. Scotophaeus kalimpongensis Gajbe, 1992 Comments: Endemic to India
5. Scotophaeus madalasae Tikader & Gajbe, 1977 Comments: Endemic to India
6. Scotophaeus merkaricola Strand, 1907 Comments: Endemic to India
7. Scotophaeus nigrosegmentatus (Simon, 1895) Distribution: India, Mongolia
8. Scotophaeus poonaensis Tikader, 1982 Comments: Endemic to India
9. Scotophaeus rajasthanus Tikader, 1966 Comments: Endemic to India
10. Scotophaeus simlaensis Tikader, 1982 Comments: Endemic to India

XIX.v. Genus Sergiolus Simon, 1891

1. Sergiolus khodiarae Patel, 1988 Comments: Endemic to India
2. Sergiolus lamhetaghatensis Gajbe & Gajbe, 1999 Comments: Endemic to India
3. Sergiolus meghalayensis Tikader & Gajbe, 1976 Comments: Endemic to India
4. Sergiolus poonaensis Tikader & Gajbe, 1976 Comments: Endemic to India
5. Sergiolus singhi Tikader & Gajbe, 1976 Comments: Endemic to India

XIX.w. Genus Setaphis Simon, 1893

1. Setaphis browni (Tucker, 1923) Distribution: India, Central, South Africa to Pakistan
2. Setaphis subtilis (Simon, 1897) Distribution: West, South Africa to Philippines

XIX.x. Genus Sosticus Chamberlin, 1922

1. Sosticus dherikanalensis Gajbe, 1979 Comments: Endemic to India
2. Sosticus jabalpurensis Bhandari & Gajbe, 2001 Comments: Endemic to India
3. Sosticus nainitalensis Gajbe, 1979 Comments: Endemic to India
4. Sosticus pawani Gajbe, 1993 Comments: Endemic to India
5. Sosticus poonaensis Tikader, 1982 Comments: Endemic to India
6. Sosticus solanensis Gajbe, 1979 Comments: Endemic to India
7. Sosticus sundargarhensis Gajbe, 1979 Comments: Endemic to India

XIX.y. Genus Talanites Simon, 1893

1. Talanites tibialis Caporiacco, 1934 Distribution: India, Pakistan Comments: Endemic to South Asia

XIX.z. Genus Trachyzelotes Lohmander, 1944

1. Trachyzelotes jaxartensis (Kroneberg, 1875) Distribution: Holarctic, Senegal, South Africa, Hawaii

XIX.aa. Genus Urozelotes Mello-Leitão, 1938

1. Urozelotes rusticus (L. Koch, 1872) Distribution: Cosmopolitan

XIX.ab. Genus Zelotes Gistel, 1848

1. Zelotes ashae Tikader & Gajbe, 1976 Comments: Endemic to India
2. Zelotes baltoroi Caporiacco, 1934 Comments: Endemic to India.
3. Zelotes chandosiensis Tikader & Gajbe, 1976 Comments: Endemic to India
4. Zelotes choubeyi Tikader & Gajbe, 1979 Comments: Endemic to India
5. Zelotes desioi Caporiacco, 1934 Comments: Endemic to India
6. Zelotes hospitus (Simon, 1897) Comments: Endemic to India
7. Zelotes jabalpurensis Tikader & Gajbe, 1976 Comments: Endemic to India
8. Zelotes kusumae Tikader, 1982 Comments: Endemic to India
9. Zelotes maindroni (Simon, 1905) Comments: Endemic to India
10. Zelotes mandae Tikader & Gajbe, 1979 Comments: Endemic to India
11. Zelotes mandlaensis Tikader & Gajbe, 1976 Comments: Endemic to India
12. Zelotes nainitalensis Tikader & Gajbe, 1976 Comments: Endemic to India
13. Zelotes naliniae Tikader & Gajbe, 1979 Comments: Endemic to India
14. Zelotes nasikensis Tikader & Gajbe, 1976 Comments: Endemic to India
15. Zelotes nilgirinus Reimoser, 1934 Comments: Endemic to India
16. Zelotes pexus (Simon, 1885) Comments: Endemic to India
17. Zelotes poonaensis Tikader & Gajbe, 1976 Comments: Endemic to India
18. Zelotes pseudopusillus Caporiacco, 1934 Comments: Endemic to India
19. Zelotes sajali Tikader & Gajbe, 1979 Comments: Endemic to India
20. Zelotes sataraensis Tikader & Gajbe, 1979 Comments: Endemic to India
21. Zelotes shantae Tikader, 1982 Comments: Endemic to India
22. Zelotes sindi Caporiacco, 1934 Comments: Endemic to India
23. Zelotes surekhae Tikader & Gajbe, 1976 Comments: Endemic to India
24. Zelotes univittatus (Simon, 1897) Comments: Endemic to India

== XX. Family Hahniidae Bertkau, 1878 ==
XX.a. Genus Hahnia C.L. Koch, 1841

1. Hahnia mridulae Tikader, 1970 Comments: Endemic to India

XX.b. Genus Neoantistea Gertsch, 1934

1. Neoantistea caporiaccoi Brignoli, 1976 Comments: Endemic to India
2. Neoantistea maxima (Caporiacco, 1935) Comments: Endemic to India.

XX.c. Genus Scotospilus Simon, 1886

1. Scotospilus maindroni (Simon, 1906) Comments: Endemic to India.

== XXI Family Hersiliidae Thorell, 1870 ==
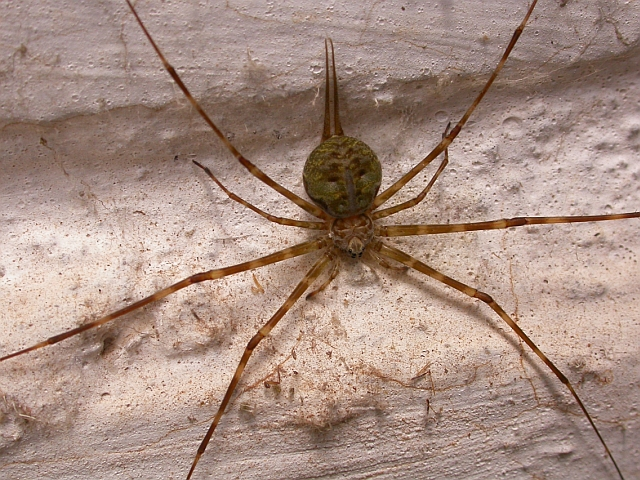
A hersiliid spider

XXI.a. Genus Hersilia Audouin, 1826

1. Hersilia savignyi Lucas, 1836 Distribution: Sri Lanka, India to Philippines
2. Hersilia sumatrana (Thorell, 1890) Distribution: India, Malaysia, Sumatra, Borneo
3. Hersilia tibialis Baehr & Baehr, 1993 Distribution: India, Sri Lanka Comments: Endemic to South Asia.

XXI.b. Genus Murricia Simon, 1882

1. Murricia triangularis Baehr & Baehr, 1993 Comments: Endemic to India

XXI.c. Genus Neotama Baehr & Baehr, 1993

1. Neotama punctigera Baehr & Baehr, 1993 Comments: Endemic to India
2. Neotama rothorum Baehr & Baehr, 1993 Comments: Endemic to India

== XXII Family Hexathelidae Simon, 1892 ==
XXII.a. Genus Macrothele Ausserer, 1871

1. Macrothele vidua Simon, 1906 Comments: Endemic to India

== XXIII Family Homalonychidae Simon, 1893 ==
XXIII.a. Genus Homalonychus Marx, 1891

1. Homalonychus raghavai Patel & Reddy, 1991 Comments: Endemic to India.

== XXIV Family Idiopidae Simon, 1892 ==
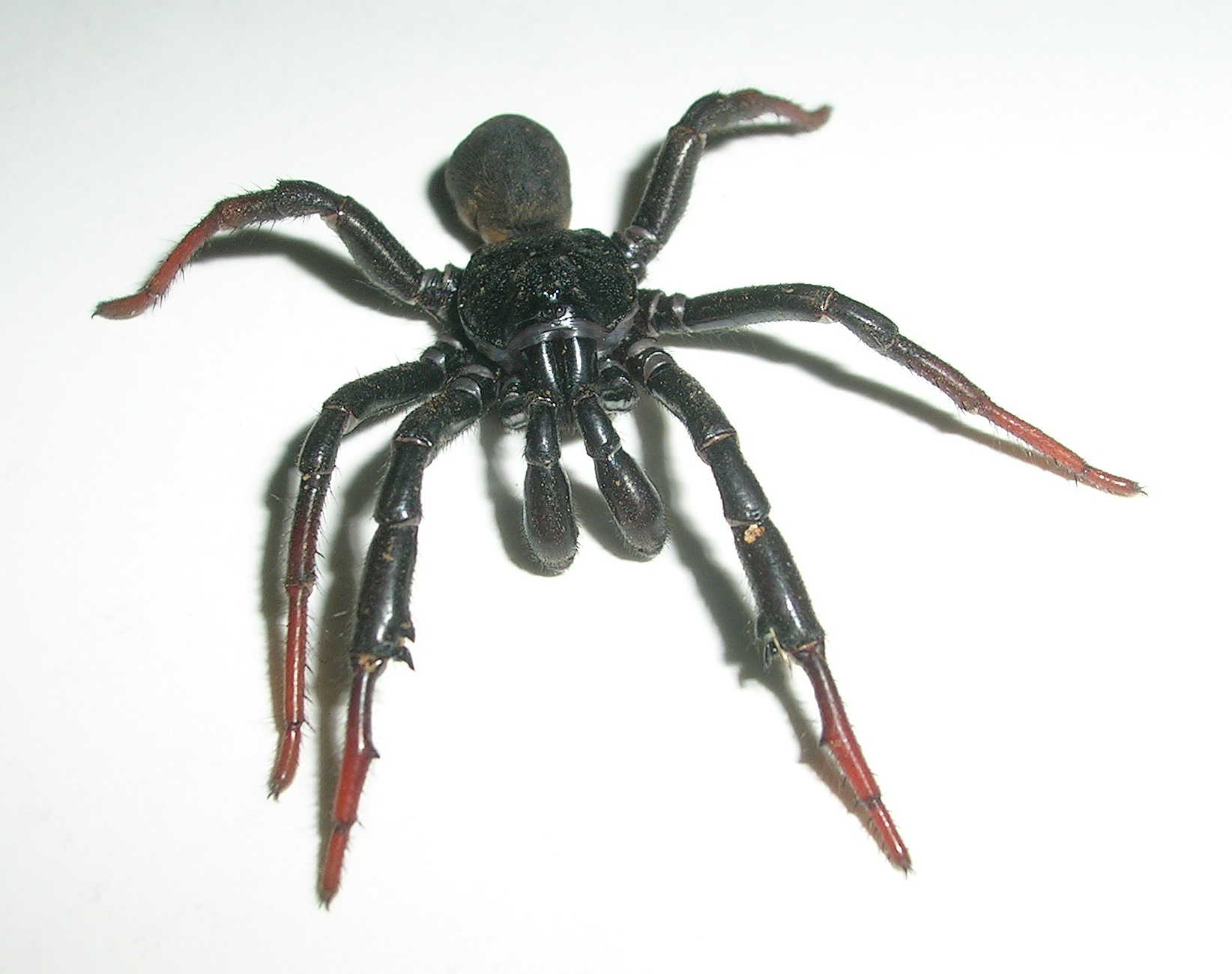
Idiops sp.

XXIV.a. Genus Heligmomerus Simon, 1892

1. Heligmomerus prostans Simon, 1892 Comments: Endemic to India

XXIV.b. Genus Idiops Perty, 1833

1. Idiops barkudensis (Gravely, 1921) Comments: Endemic to India
2. Idiops biharicus Gravely, 1915 Comments: Endemic to India
3. Idiops bombayensis nom. nov. Comments: Endemic to India.
4. Idiops constructor (Pocock, 1900) Comments: Endemic to India
5. Idiops designatus O.P.-Cambridge, 1885 Comments: Endemic to India
6. Idiops fortis (Pocock, 1900) Comments: Endemic to India
7. Idiops fossor (Pocock, 1900) Comments: Endemic to India
8. Idiops garoensis (Tikader, 1977) Comments: Endemic to India
9. Idiops madrasensis (Tikader, 1977) Comments: Endemic to India

XXIV.c. Genus Scalidognathus Karsch, 1891

1. Scalidognathus montanus (Pocock, 1900) Comments: Endemic to India

== XXV. Family Linyphiidae Blackwall, 1859 ==
XXV.a. Genus Collinsia O. P.-Cambridge, 1913

1. Collinsia crassipalpis (Caporiacco, 1935) Comments: Endemic to India

XXV.b. Genus Cresmatoneta Simon, 1929

1. Cresmatoneta leucophthalma (Fage, 1946) Comments: Endemic to India

XXV.c. Genus Emenista Simon, 1894

1. Emenista bisinuosa Simon, 1894 Comments: Endemic to India

XXV.d. Genus Erigone Audouin, 1826

1. Erigone rohtangensis Tikader, 1981 Comments: Endemic to India

XXV.e. Genus Gongylidiellum Simon, 1884

1. Gongylidiellum confusum Thaler, 1987 Comments: Endemic to India

XXV.f. Genus Heterolinyphia Wunderlich, 1973 Comments: This Genus is endemic to South Asia.

1. Heterolinyphia tarakotensis Wunderlich, 1973 Distribution: India, Nepal Comments: Endemic to South Asia

XXV.g. Genus Himalaphantes Tanasevitch, 1992

1. Himalaphantes martensi (Thaler, 1987) Distribution: India, Nepal Comments: Endemic to South Asia.

XXV.h. Genus Indophantes Saaristo & Tanasevitch, 2003

1. Indophantes bengalensis Saaristo & Tanasevitch, 2003 Comments: Endemic to India
2. Indophantes digitulus (Thaler, 1987) Distribution: India, Nepal Comments: Endemic to South Asia.
3. Indophantes pallidus Saaristo & Tanasevitch, 2003 Comments: Endemic to India

XXV.i. Genus Labulla Simon, 1884

1. Labulla nepula Tikader, 1970 Comments: Endemic to India.

XXV.j. Genus Lepthyphantes Menge, 1866

1. Lepthyphantes bhudbari Tikader, 1970 Comments: Endemic to India
2. Lepthyphantes lingsoka Tikader, 1970 Comments: Endemic to India
3. Lepthyphantes rudrai Tikader, 1970 Comments: Endemic to India

XXV.k. Genus Linyphia Latreille, 1804

1. Linyphia nicobarensis Tikader, 1977 Comments: Endemic to Andaman & Nicobar Islands
2. Linyphia perampla O.P.-Cambridge, 1885 Comments: Endemic to India
3. Linyphia sikkimensis Tikader, 1970 Comments: Endemic to India
4. Linyphia straminea O.P.-Cambridge, 1885 Comments: Endemic to India
5. Linyphia urbasae Tikader, 1970 Comments: Endemic to India

XXV.l. Genus Minicia Thorell, 1875

1. Minicia vittata Caporiacco, 1935 Comments: Endemic to India

XXV.m. Genus Neriene Blackwall, 1833

1. Neriene birmanica (Thorell, 1887) Distribution: India, Myanmar, China

XXV.n. Genus Oedothorax Bertkau, in Förster & Bertkau, 1883

1. Oedothorax caporiaccoi Roewer, 1942 Comments: Endemic to India.
2. Oedothorax globiceps Thaler, 1987 Comments: Endemic to India

XXV.o. Genus Troxochrota Kulczyn’ski, 1894

1. Troxochrota kashmirica (Caporiacco, 1935) Comments: Endemic to India.

== XXVI Family Liocranidae Simon, 1897 ==
XXVI.a. Genus Sphingius Thorell, 1890

1. Sphingius barkudensis Gravely, 1931 Distribution: Bangladesh, India Comments: Endemic to South Asia
2. Sphingius bilineatus Simon, 1906 Comments: Endemic to India
3. Sphingius caniceps Simon, 1906 Comments: Endemic to India
4. Sphingius kambakamensis Gravely, 1931 Comments: Endemic to India
5. Sphingius longipes Gravely, 1931 Comments: Endemic to India
6. Sphingius nilgiriensis Gravely, 1931 Comments: Endemic to India
7. Sphingius paltaensis Biswas & Biswas, 1992 Comments: Endemic to India

== XXVII Family Lycosidae Sundevall, 1833 ==
XXVII.a. Genus Agalenocosa Mello-Leitão, 1944

1. Agalenocosa subinermis (Simon, 1897) Comments: Endemic to India.

XXVII.b. Genus Arctosa C.L. Koch, 1847

1. Arctosa himalayensis Tikader & Malhotra, 1980 Comments: Endemic to India
2. Arctosa indica Tikader & Malhotra, 1980 Distribution: India, China
3. Arctosa khudiensis (Sinha, 1951) Distribution: India, China
4. Arctosa lesserti Reimoser, 1934 Comments: Endemic to India
5. Arctosa mulani (Dyal, 1935) Distribution: India, Pakistan Comments: Endemic to South Asia.
6. Arctosa sandeshkhaliensis Majumder, 2004 Comments: Endemic to India
7. Arctosa tappaensis Gajbe, 2004 Comments: Endemic to India

XXVII.c. Genus Crocodilosa Caporiacco, 1947

1. Crocodilosa leucostigma (Simon, 1885) Comments: Endemic to India.
2. Crocodilosa maindroni (Simon, 1897) Comments: Endemic to India

XXVII.d. Genus Evippa Simon, 1882

1. Evippa banarensis Tikader & Malhotra, 1980 Comments: Endemic to India
2. Evippa jabalpurensis Gajbe, 2004 Comments: Endemic to India
3. Evippa mandlaensis Gajbe, 2004 Comments: Endemic to India
4. Evippa praelongipes (O.P.-Cambridge, 1870) Distribution: Egypt to India, Pakistan, Kazakhstan
5. Evippa rajasthanea Tikader & Malhotra, 1980 Comments: Endemic to India
6. Evippa rubiginosa Simon, 1885 Comments: Endemic to India
7. Evippa shivajii Tikader & Malhotra, 1980 Comments: Endemic to India
8. Evippa sohani Tikader & Malhotra, 1980 Comments: Endemic to India
9. Evippa solanensis Tikader & Malhotra, 1980 Comments: Endemic to India

XXVII.e. Genus Evippomma Roewer, 1959

1. Evippomma evippinum (Simon, 1897) Comments: Endemic to India

XXVII.f. Genus Geolycosa Montgomery, 1904

1. Geolycosa carli (Reimoser, 1934) Comments: Endemic to India.
2. Geolycosa urbana (O.P.-Cambridge, 1876) Distribution: North, Central Africa to India

XXVII.g. Genus Hippasa Simon, 1885

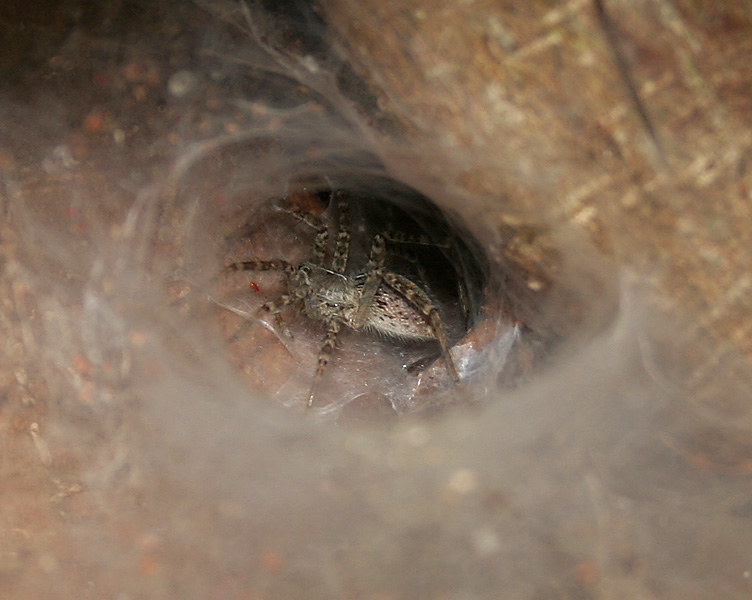
Hippasa agelenoides

1. Hippasa agelenoides (Simon, 1884) Distribution: India to Taiwan
2. Hippasa charamaensis Gajbe, 2004 Comments: Endemic to India
3. Hippasa fabreae Gajbe & Gajbe, 1999 Comments: Endemic to India
4. Hippasa greenalliae (Blackwall, 1867) Distribution: India, Sri Lanka, China
5. Hippasa hansae Gajbe & Gajbe, 1999 Comments: Endemic to India
6. Hippasa haryanensis Arora & Monga, 1994 Comments: Endemic to India
7. Hippasa himalayensis Gravely, 1924 Comments: Endemic to India
8. Hippasa holmerae Thorell, 1895 Distribution: India to Philippines
9. Hippasa loundesi Gravely, 1924 Comments: Endemic to India
10. Hippasa lycosina Pocock, 1900 Distribution: India, China
11. Hippasa madhuae Tikader & Malhotra, 1980 Comments: Endemic to India
12. Hippasa madraspatana Gravely, 1924 Comments: Endemic to India
13. Hippasa olivacea Thorell, 1887 Distribution: India, Myanmar
14. Hippasa partita (O.P.-Cambridge, 1876) Distribution: Egypt to India, Central Asia
15. Hippasa pisaurina Pocock, 1900 Distribution: Iraq, India, Pakistan
16. Hippasa valiveruensis Patel & Reddy, 1993 Comments: Endemic to India
17. Hippasa wigglesworthi Gajbe & Gajbe, 1999 Comments: Endemic to India

XXVII.h. Genus Hogna Simon, 1885

1. Hogna himalayensis (Gravely, 1924) Distribution: India, Bhutan, China
2. Hogna stictopyga (Thorell, 1895) Distribution: India, Myanmar, Singapore

XXVII.i. Genus Lycosa Latreille, 1804

1. Lycosa arambagensis Biswas & Biswas, 1992 Comments: Endemic to India
2. Lycosa balaramai Patel & Reddy, 1993 Comments: Endemic to India
3. Lycosa barnesi Gravely, 1924 Comments: Endemic to India
4. Lycosa bhatnagari Sadana, 1969 Comments: Endemic to India
5. Lycosa bistriata Gravely, 1924 Distribution: India, Bhutan
6. Lycosa carmichaeli Gravely, 1924 Comments: Endemic to India.
7. Lycosa chaperi Simon, 1885 Comments: Endemic to India
8. Lycosa choudhuryi Tikader & Malhotra, 1980 Distribution: India, China
9. Lycosa fuscana Pocock, 1901 Comments: Endemic to India.
10. Lycosa geotubalis Tikader & Malhotra, 1980 Comments: Endemic to India
11. Lycosa goliathus Pocock, 1901 Comments: Endemic to India
12. Lycosa indagatrix Walckenaer, 1837 Distribution: India, Sri Lanka
13. Lycosa iranii Pocock, 1901 Comments: Endemic to India.
14. Lycosa jagadalpurensis Gajbe, 2004 Comments: Endemic to India
15. Lycosa kempi Gravely, 1924 Distribution: India, Pakistan, Bhutan, China
16. Lycosa lambai Tikader & Malhotra, 1980 Comments: Endemic to India
17. Lycosa mackenziei Gravely, 1924 Distribution: Pakistan, India, Bangladesh
18. Lycosa madani Pocock, 1901 Comments: Endemic to India.
19. Lycosa mahabaleshwarensis Tikader & Malhotra, 1980 Comments: Endemic to India
20. Lycosa masteri Pocock, 1901 Comments: Endemic to India.
21. Lycosa nigrotibialis Simon, 1884 Distribution: India, Bhutan, Myanmar
22. Lycosa phipsoni Pocock, 1899 Distribution: India to China, Taiwan
23. Lycosa pictula Pocock, 1901 Comments: Endemic to India.
24. Lycosa poonaensis Tikader & Malhotra, 1980 Comments: Endemic to India
25. Lycosa prolifica Pocock, 1901 Comments: Endemic to India.
26. Lycosa shahapuraensis Gajbe, 2004 Comments: Endemic to India
27. Lycosa shaktae Bhandari & Gajbe, 2001 Comments: Endemic to India.
28. Lycosa shillongensis Tikader & Malhotra, 1980 Comments: Endemic to India.
29. Lycosa thoracica Patel & Reddy, 1993 Comments: Endemic to India
30. Lycosa tista Tikader, 1970 Comments: Endemic to India
31. Lycosa wroughtoni Pocock, 1899 Comments: Endemic to India.

XXVII.j. Genus Margonia Hippa & Lehtinen, 1983 Comments: Monotypic Genus and endemic to India.

1. Margonia himalayensis (Gravely, 1924) Comments: Endemic to India.

XXVII.k. Genus Ocyale Audouin, 1826

1. Ocyale kalpiensis Gajbe, 2004 Comments: Endemic to India
2. Ocyale neatalanta Alderweireldt, 1996 Distribution: West Africa to Myanmar

XXVII.l. Genus Pardosa C. L. Koch, 1847

1. Pardosa algoides Schenkel, 1963 Distribution: India, China
2. Pardosa alii Tikader, 1977 Comments: Endemic to India
3. Pardosa altitudis Tikader & Malhotra, 1980 Distribution: India, China
4. Pardosa amkhasensis Tikader & Malhotra, 1976 Comments: Endemic to India.
5. Pardosa atropalpis Gravely, 1924 Comments: Endemic to India
6. Pardosa balaghatensis Gajbe, 2004 Comments: Endemic to India
7. Pardosa bastarensis Gajbe, 2004 Comments: Endemic to India
8. Pardosa bargaonensis Gajbe, 2004 Comments: Endemic to India
9. Pardosa birmanica Simon, 1884 distribution: Pakistan to China, Philippines, Sumatra
10. Pardosa burasantiensis Tikader & Malhotra, 1976 Distribution: India, China
11. Pardosa chambaensis Tikader & Malhotra, 1976 Comments: Endemic to India
12. Pardosa debolinae Majumder, 2004 Comments: Endemic to India
13. Pardosa duplicata Saha, Biswas & Raychaudhuri, 1994 Comments: Endemic to India
14. Pardosa fletcheri (Gravely, 1924) Distribution: India, Nepal, Pakistan Comments: Endemic to South Asia.
15. Pardosa gopalai Patel & Reddy, 1993 Comments: Endemic to India
16. Pardosa heterophthalma (Simon, 1898) Distribution: India to Java
17. Pardosa jabalpurensis Gajbe & Gajbe, 1999 Comments: Endemic to India
18. Pardosa kalpiensis Gajbe, 2004 Comments: Endemic to India
19. Pardosa kupupa (Tikader, 1970) Distribution: India, China
20. Pardosa lahorensis Dyal, 1935 Distribution: India, Pakistan Comments: Endemic to South Asia
21. Pardosa leucopalpis Gravely, 1924 Distribution: India, Pakistan, Sri Lanka Comments: Endemic to South Asia
22. Pardosa minuta Tikader & Malhotra, 1976 Comments: Endemic to India
23. Pardosa mukundi Tikader & Malhotra, 1980 Comments: Endemic to India
24. Pardosa mysorensis (Tikader & Mukerji, 1971) Comments: Endemic to India.
25. Pardosa nicobarica (Thorell, 1891) Comments: Endemic to Andaman & Nicobar Islands
26. Pardosa oakleyi Gravely, 1924 Distribution: Pakistan, India, Bangladesh Comments: Endemic to South Asia
27. Pardosa orcchaensis Gajbe, 2004 Comments: Endemic to India
28. Pardosa partita Simon, 1885 Comments: Endemic to India
29. Pardosa porpaensis Gajbe, 2004 Comments: Endemic to India
30. Pardosa pseudoannulata (Bösenberg & Strand, 1906) Distribution: Pakistan to Japan, Philippines, Java
31. Pardosa pusiola (Thorell, 1891) Distribution: India to China and Java
32. Pardosa ranjani Gajbe, 2004 Comments: Endemic to India
33. Pardosa rhenockensis (Tikader, 1970) Comments: Endemic to India.
34. Pardosa shyamae (Tikader, 1970) Distribution: India, China
35. Pardosa songosa Tikader & Malhotra, 1976 Distribution: India, China
36. Pardosa subhadrae Patel & Reddy, 1993 Comments: Endemic to India
37. Pardosa suchismitae Majumder, 2004 Comments: Endemic to India
38. Pardosa sumatrana (Thorell, 1890) Distribution: India, China to Philippines, Sulawesi
39. Pardosa sutherlandi (Gravely, 1924) Distribution: India, Nepal Comments: Endemic to South Asia
40. Pardosa tappaensis Gajbe, 2004 Comments: Endemic to India
41. Pardosa thalassia (Thorell, 1891) Comments: Endemic to Andaman & Nicobar Islands
42. Pardosa tikaderi Arora & Monga, 1994 Comments: Endemic to India
43. Pardosa timidula (Roewer, 1951) Distribution: Yemen, Sri Lanka, Pakistan
44. Pardosa tridentis Caporiacco, 1935 Distribution: India, Nepal Comments: Endemic to South Asia.

XXVII.m. Genus Passiena Thorell, 1890

1. Passiena spinicrus Thorell, 1890 Distribution: India to Hong Kong, Sumatra, Sulawesi

XXVII.n. Genus Shapna Hippa & Lehtinen, 1983 Comments: Monotypic Genus and endemic to India.

1. Shapna pluvialis Hippa & Lehtinen, 1983 Comments: Endemic to India

XXVII.o. Genus Trochosa C.L. Koch, 1847

1. Trochosa gunturensis Patel & Reddy, 1993 Comments: Endemic to India
2. Trochosa himalayensis Tikader & Malhotra, 1980 Comments: Endemic to India
3. Trochosa punctipes (Gravely, 1924) Comments: Endemic to India.

XXVII.p. Genus Wadicosa Zyuzin, 1985

1. Wadicosa quadrifera (Gravely, 1924) Distribution: India, Sri Lanka

XXVII.q. Genus Zoica Simon, 1898

1. Zoica puellula (Simon, 1898) Distribution: India, Sri Lanka Comments: Endemic to South Asia

== XXVIII. Family Mimetidae Simon, 1881 ==
XXVIII.a. Genus Melaenosia Simon, 1906 Comments: Monotypic Genus and endemic to India.

1. Melaenosia pustulifera Simon, 1906 Comments: Endemic to India

XXVIII.b. Genus Mimetus Hentz, 1832

1. Mimetus indicus Simon, 1906 Comments: Endemic to India
2. Mimetus tikaderi Gajbe, 1992 Comments: Endemic to India

== XXIX. Family Miturgidae Simon, 1885 ==
XXIX.a. Genus Cheiracanthium C. L. Koch, 1839

1. Cheiracanthium adjacens O. P.-Cambridge, 1885 Distribution: China, India
2. Cheiracanthium conflexum Simon, 1906 Comments: Endemic to India
3. Cheiracanthium conspersum (Thorell, 1891) Comments: Endemic to Andaman & Nicobar Islands
4. Cheiracanthium danieli Tikader, 1975 Comments: Endemic to India
5. Cheiracanthium himalayense Gravely, 1931 Comments: Endemic to India
6. Cheiracanthium incomptum (Thorell, 1891) Comments: Endemic to Andaman & Nicobar Islands
7. Cheiracanthium indicum O.P.-Cambridge, 1874 Distribution: India, Sri Lanka Comments: Endemic to South Asia
8. Cheiracanthium inornatum O.P.-Cambridge, 1874 Comments: Endemic to India
9. Cheiracanthium insigne O.P.-Cambridge, 1874 Distribution: India, Sri Lanka, China
10. Cheiracanthium jabalpurense Majumder & Tikader, 1991 Comments: Endemic to India
11. Cheiracanthium kashmirense Majumder & Tikader, 1991 Comments: Endemic to India
12. Cheiracanthium melanostomum (Thorell, 1895) Distribution: India, Bangladesh,
13. Cheiracanthium mysorense Majumder & Tikader, 1991 Comments: Endemic to India
14. Cheiracanthium nalsaroverense Patel & Patel, 1973 Comments: Endemic to India
15. Cheiracanthium pauriense Majumder & Tikader, Comments: Endemic to India
16. Cheiracanthium pelasgicum (C.L. Koch, 1837) Distribution: Palearctic
17. Cheiracanthium poonaense Majumder & Tikader, 1991 Comments: Endemic to India
18. Cheiracanthium punjabense Sadana & Bajaj, 1980 Comments: Endemic to India
19. Cheiracanthium sambii Patel & Reddy, 1991 Comments: Endemic to India
20. Cheiracanthium saraswatii Tikader, 1962 Comments: Endemic to India
21. Cheiracanthium seshii Patel & Reddy, 1991 Comments: Endemic to India.
22. Cheiracanthium sikkimense Majumder & Tikader, 1991 Comments: Endemic to India
23. Cheiracanthium triviale (Thorell, 1895) Distribution: India, Myanmar
24. Cheiracanthium trivittatum Simon, 1906 Comments: Endemic to India
25. Cheiracanthium turiae Strand, 1917 Distribution: Thailand to Queensland
26. Cheiracanthium vorax O.P.-Cambridge, 1874 Comments: Endemic to India

XXIX.b. Genus Eutichurus Simon, 1897

1. Eutichurus chingliputensis Majumder & Tikader, 1991 Comments: Endemic to India
2. Eutichurus tezpurensis Biswas, 1991 Comments: Endemic to India

XXIX.c. Genus Systaria Simon, 1897

1. Systaria barkudensis (Gravely, 1931) Comments: Endemic to India.

== XXX. Family Mysmenidae Petrunkevitch, 1928 ==
XXX.a. Genus Iardinis Simon, 1899 Comments: Endemic to South Asia.

1. Iardinis mussardi Brignoli, 1980 Comments: Endemic to India

== XXXI Family Nemesiidae Simon, 1892 ==
XXXI.a. Genus Damarchus Thorell, 1891

1. Damarchus assamensis Hirst, 1909 Comments: Endemic to India
2. Damarchus bifidus Gravely, 1935 Comments: Endemic to India
3. Damarchus excavatus Gravely, 1921 Comments: Endemic to India

== XXXII Family Ochyroceratidae Fage, 1912 ==
XXXII.a. Genus Althepus Thorell, 1898

1. Althepus incognitus Brignoli, 1973 Comments: Endemic to India

== XXXIII Family Oecobiidae Blackwall, 1862 ==
XXXIII.a. Genus Oecobius Lucas, 1846

1. Oecobius chiasma Barman, 1978 Comments: Endemic to India
2. Oecobius marathaus Tikader, 1962 Distribution: Pan tropical
3. Oecobius putus O.P.-Cambridge, 1876 Distribution: Egypt, Sudan to Azerbaijan (USA, introduced)

XXXIII.b. Genus Uroctea Dufour, 1820

1. Uroctea indica Pocock, 1900 Comments: Endemic to India
2. Uroctea manii Patel, 1987 Comments: Endemic to India

== XXXIV Family Oonopidae Simon, 1890 ==
XXXIV.a. Genus Dysderoides Fage, 1946

1. Dysderoides typhlos Fage, 1946 Comments: Endemic to India

XXXIV.b. Genus Gamasomorpha Karsch, 1881

1. Gamasomorpha clypeolaria Simon, 1907 Comments: Endemic to India
2. Gamasomorpha nigripalpis Simon, 1893 Distribution: India, Sri Lanka Comments: Endemic to South Asia
3. Gamasomorpha taprobanica Simon, 1893 Distribution: India, Sri Lanka Comments: Endemic to South Asia

XXXIV.c. Genus Ischnothyreus Simon, 1893

1. Ischnothyreus deccanensis Tikader & Malhotra, 1974 Comments: Endemic to India
2. Ischnothyreus shillongensis Tikader, 1968 Distribution: India, Bhutan Comments: Endemic to South Asia.

XXXIV.d. Genus Triaeris Simon, 1891

1. Triaeris barela Gajbe, 2004 Comments: Endemic to India
2. Triaeris glenniei Fage, 1946 Comments: Endemic to India
3. Triaeris khashiensis Tikader, 1966 Comments: Endemic to India
4. Triaeris manii Tikader & Malhotra, 1974 Comments: Endemic to India
5. Triaeris nagarensis Tikader & Malhotra, 1974 Comments: Endemic to India
6. Triaeris nagpurensis Tikader & Malhotra, 1974 Comments: Endemic to India
7. Triaeris poonaensis Tikader & Malhotra, 1974 Comments: Endemic to India

== XXXV. Family Oxyopidae Thorell, 1870 ==
XXXV.a. Genus Hamataliwa Keyserling, 1887

1. Hamataliwa sikkimensis (Tikader, 1970) Distribution: India, China

XXXV.b. Genus Oxyopes Latreille, 1804

1. Oxyopes armatipalpis Strand, 1912 Comments: Endemic to India
2. Oxyopes ashae Gajbe, 1999 Comments: Endemic to India
3. Oxyopes assamensis Tikader, 1969 Comments: Endemic to India
4. Oxyopes bharatae Gajbe, 1999 Comments: Endemic to India
5. Oxyopes biharensis Gajbe, 1999 Comments: Endemic to India
6. Oxyopes birmanicus Thorell, 1887 Distribution: India, China to Sumatra
7. Oxyopes boriensis Bodkhe & Vankhede, 2012 Comments: Endemic to India
8. Oxyopes chittrae Tikader, 1965 Synonym: Oxyopes chitrae Tikader, 1965 Comments: Endemic to India
9. Oxyopes elongatus Biswas et al., 1996 Distribution: India, China to Sumatra
10. Oxyopes gemellus Thorell, 1891 Distribution: India, Malaysia
11. Oxyopes gujaratensis Gajbe, 1999 Comments: Endemic to India
12. Oxyopes gurjanti Sadana & Gupta, 1995 Comments: Endemic to India
13. Oxyopes hindostanicus Pocock, 1901 Distribution: India, Sri Lanka Comments: Endemic to South Asia
14. Oxyopes indicus (Walckenaer, 1805) Comments: Endemic to India
15. Oxyopes jabalpurensis Gajbe & Gajbe, 1999 Comments: Endemic to India
16. Oxyopes javanus Thorell, 1887 Distribution: India, China to Java, Philippines
17. a. O. javanus nicobaricus Strand, 1907 Comments: Endemic to Andaman & Nicobar Islands
18. Oxyopes jubilans O.P.-Cambridge, 1885 Distribution: India, Pakistan, China
19. Oxyopes kamalae Gajbe, 1999 Comments: Endemic to India.
20. Oxyopes ketani Gajbe & Gajbe, 1999 Comments: Endemic to India
21. Oxyopes kusumae Gajbe, 1999 Comments: Endemic to India
22. Oxyopes lepidus (Blackwall, 1864) Comments: Endemic to India
23. Oxyopes lineatus Latreille, 1806 Distribution: Palearctic
24. Oxyopes longinquus Thorell, 1891 Distribution: India, Myanmar
25. Oxyopes longispinus Saha & Raychaudhuri, 2003 Comments: Endemic to India
26. Oxyopes ludhianaensis Sadana & Goel, 1995 Comments: Endemic to India
27. Oxyopes minutus Biswas et al., 1996 Comments: Endemic to India
28. Oxyopes naliniae Gajbe, 1999 Comments: Endemic to India
29. Oxyopes ovatus Biswas et al., 1996 Comments: Endemic to India
30. Oxyopes pandae Tikader, 1969 Comments: Endemic to India
31. Oxyopes pankaji Gajbe & Gajbe, 2001 Comments: Endemic to India
32. Oxyopes pawani Gajbe, 1992 Comments: Endemic to India
33. Oxyopes rajai Saha & Raychaudhuri, 2004 Comments: Endemic to India
34. Oxyopes ratnae Tikader, 1970 Comments: Endemic to India
35. Oxyopes reddyi Majumder, 2004 Comments: Endemic to India
36. Oxyopes reticulatus Biswas et al., 1996 Comments: Endemic to India
37. Oxyopes rukminiae Gajbe, 1999 Comments: Endemic to India
38. Oxyopes ryvesi Pocock, 1901 Comments: Endemic to India.
39. Oxyopes sakuntalae Tikader, 1970 Comments: Endemic to India
40. Oxyopes shweta Tikader, 1970 Distribution: India, China
41. Oxyopes sitae Tikader, 1970 Comments: Endemic to India
42. Oxyopes subhadrae Tikader, 1970 Comments: Endemic to India
43. Oxyopes subimali Biswas et al., 1996 Comments: Endemic to India
44. Oxyopes sunandae Tikader, 1970 Comments: Endemic to India
45. Oxyopes sushilae Tikader, 1965 Distribution: India, China
46. Oxyopes tikaderi Biswas & Majumder, 1995 Comments: Endemic to India
47. Oxyopes travancoricola Strand, 1912 Comments: Endemic to India
48. Oxyopes wroughtoni Pocock, 1901 Comments: Endemic to India

XXXV.c. Genus Peucetia Thorell, 1869

1. Peucetia akwadaensis Patel, 1978 Distribution: India, China
2. Peucetia ashae Gajbe & Gajbe, 1999 Comments: Endemic to India
3. Peucetia biharensis Gajbe, 1999 Comments: Endemic to India
4. Peucetia choprai Tikader, 1965 Comments: Endemic to India
5. Peucetia elegans (Blackwall, 1864) Comments: Endemic to India
6. Peucetia gauntleta Saha & Raychaudhuri, 2004 Comments: Endemic to India
7. Peucetia graminea Pocock, 1900 Comments: Endemic to India
8. Peucetia harishankarensis Biswas, 1975 Comments: Endemic to India
9. Peucetia jabalpurensis Gajbe & Gajbe, 1999 Comments: Endemic to India
10. Peucetia ketani Gajbe, 1992 Comments: Endemic to India
11. Peucetia latikae Tikader, 1970 Distribution: India, China
12. Peucetia pawani Gajbe, 1999 Comments: Endemic to India
13. Peucetia punjabensis Gajbe, 1999 Comments: Endemic to India
14. Peucetia rajani Gajbe, 1999 Comments: Endemic to India

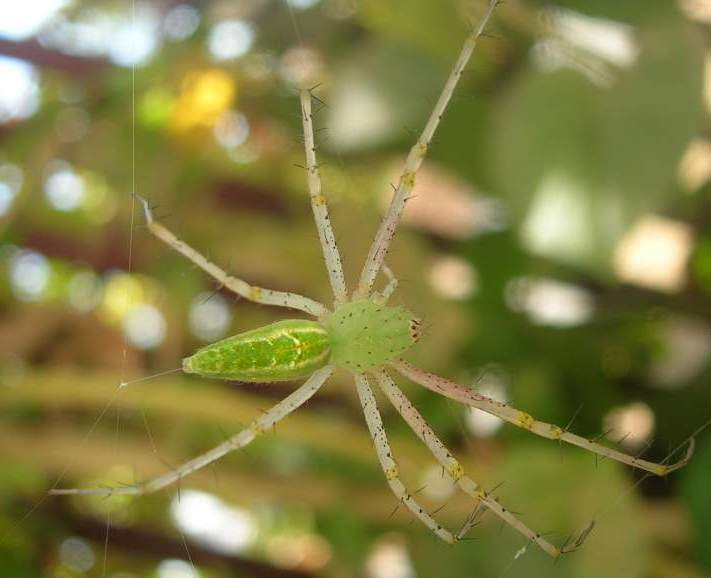
Peucetia viridana

1. Peucetia viridana (Stoliczka, 1869) Distribution: India to Myanmar
2. Peucetia viveki Gajbe, 1999 Comments: Endemic to India
3. Peucetia yogeshi Gajbe, 1999 Comments: Endemic to India

XXXV.d. Genus Tapponia Simon, 1885

1. Tapponia insulana Thorell, 1891 Comments: Endemic to Andaman & Nicobar Islands

== XXXVI Family Palpimanidae Thorell, 1870 ==
XXXVI.a. Genus Palpimanus Dufour, 1820

1. Palpimanus gibbulus Dufour, 1820 Distribution: Mediterranean, Central Asia
2. Palpimanus vultuosus Simon, 1897 Comments: Endemic to India

XXXVI.b. Genus Sarascelis Simon, 1897

1. Sarascelis raffrayi Simon, 1893 Distribution: India, Malaysia

== XXXVII Family Philodromidae Thorell, 1870 ==
XXXVII.a. Genus Apollophanes O.P.-Cambridge, 1898

1. Apollophanes bangalores Tikader, 1963 Comments: Endemic to India

XXXVII.b. Genus Ebo Keyserling, 1884

1. Ebo bharatae Tikader, 1965 Comments: Endemic to India

XXXVII.c. Genus Gephyrota Strand, 1932

1. Gephyrota pudica (Simon, 1906) Comments: Endemic to India

XXXVII.d. Genus Philodromus Walckenaer, 1826

1. Philodromus ashae Gajbe & Gajbe, 1999 Comments: Endemic to India
2. Philodromus assamensis Tikader, 1962 Distribution: India, China
3. Philodromus barmani Tikader, 1980 Comments: Endemic to India
4. Philodromus betrabatai Tikader, 1966 Comments: Endemic to India
5. Philodromus bhagirathai Tikader, 1966 Comments: Endemic to India
6. Philodromus bigibbus (O.P.-Cambridge, 1876) Distribution: Egypt, Sudan, Arabia, India
7. Philodromus chambaensis Tikader, 1980 Distribution: India, China
8. Philodromus decoratus Tikader, 1962 Comments: Endemic to India
9. Philodromus devhutai Tikader, 1966 Comments: Endemic to India
10. Philodromus domesticus Tikader, 1962 Comments: Endemic to India
11. Philodromus durvei Tikader, 1980 Comments: Endemic to India
12. Philodromus frontosus Simon, 1897 Comments: Endemic to India
13. Philodromus jabalpurensis Gajbe & Gajbe, 1999 Comments: Endemic to India
14. Philodromus kendrabatai Tikader, 1966 Comments: Endemic to India
15. Philodromus lepidus Blackwall, 1870 Distribution: Mediterranean to India
16. Philodromus maliniae Tikader, 1966 Comments: Endemic to India
17. Philodromus manikae Tikader, 1971 Comments: Endemic to India
18. Philodromus mohiniae Tikader, 1966 Comments: Endemic to India
19. Philodromus pali Gajbe & Gajbe, 2001 Comments: Endemic to India
20. Philodromus sanjeevi Gajbe, 2004 Comments: Endemic to India
21. Philodromus shillongensis Tikader, 1962 Comments: Endemic to India
22. Philodromus tiwarii Basu, 1973 Comments: Endemic to India

XXXVII.e. Genus Psellonus Simon, 1897 Comments: Monotypic Genus and endemic to India.

1. Psellonus planus Simon, 1897 Comments: Endemic to India

XXXVII.f. Genus Thanatus C.L. Koch, 1837

1. Thanatus dhakuricus Tikader, 1960 Comments: Endemic to India
2. Thanatus indicus Simon, 1885 Comments: Endemic to India
3. Thanatus jabalpurensis Gajbe & Gajbe, 1999 Comments: Endemic to India
4. Thanatus lanceoletus Tikader, 1966 Comments: Endemic to India.
5. Thanatus ketani Bhandari & Gajbe, 2001 Comments: Endemic to India
6. Thanatus mandali Tikader, 1965 Comments: Endemic to India
7. Thanatus prolixus Simon, 1897 Comments: Endemic to India
8. Thanatus simplicipalpis Simon, 1882 Distribution: India, Yemen
9. Thanatus stripatus Tikader, 1980 Comments: Endemic to India

XXXVII.g. Genus Tibellus Simon, 1875

1. Tibellus chaturshingi Tikader, 1962 Comments: Endemic to India
2. Tibellus elongatus Tikader, 1960 Comments: Endemic to India
3. Tibellus jabalpurensis Gajbe & Gajbe, 1999 Comments: Endemic to India
4. Tibellus katrajghatus Tikader, 1962 Comments: Endemic to India
5. Tibellus pashanensis Tikader, 1980 Comments: Endemic to India
6. Tibellus pateli Tikader, 1980 Comments: Endemic to India.
7. Tibellus poonaensis Tikader, 1962 Comments: Endemic to India
8. Tibellus vitilis Simon, 1906 Distribution: India, Sri Lanka Comments: Endemic to South Asia

== XXXVIII. Family Pholcidae C.L. Koch, 1851 ==
XXXVIII.a. Genus Artema Walckenaer, 1837

1. Artema atlanta Walckenaer, 1837 Distribution: Pantropical

XXXVIII.b. Genus Crossopriza Simon, 1893

1. Crossopriza lyoni (Blackwall, 1867) Distribution: Cosmopolitan

XXXVIII.c. Genus Pholcus Walckenaer, 1805

1. Pholcus kapuri Tikader, 1977 Comments: Endemic to Andaman & Nicobar Islands
2. Pholcus phalangioides (Fuesslin, 1775) Distribution: Cosmopolitan
3. Pholcus podophthalmus Simon, 1893 Distribution: India, China

XXXVIII.d. Genus Smeringopus Simon, 1890

1. Smeringopus pallidus (Blackwall, 1858) Distribution: Cosmopolitan

== XXXIX. Family Pimoidae Wunderlich, 1986 ==
XXXIX.a. Genus Pimoa Chamberlin & Ivie, 1943

1. Pimoa crispa (Fage, 1946) Comments: Endemic to India
2. Pimoa gandhii Hormiga, 1994 Comments: Endemic to India
3. Pimoa indiscreta Hormiga, 1994 Comments: Endemic to India

== XL. Family Pisauridae Simon, 1890 ==
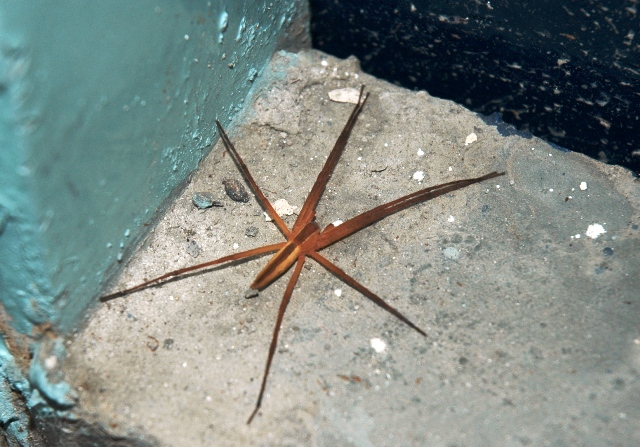
Thalassius albocinctus

XL.a. Genus Dendrolycosa Doleschall, 1859

1. Dendrolycosa gracilis Thorell, 1891 Comments: Endemic to Andaman & Nicobar Islands
2. Dendrolycosa stauntoni Pocock, 1900 Comments: Endemic to India

XL.b. Genus Eucamptopus Pocock, 1900 Comments: Monotypic Genus and endemic to India.

1. Eucamptopus coronatus Pocock, 1900 Comments: Endemic to India

XL.c. Genus Euprosthenops Pocock, 1897

1. Euprosthenops ellioti (O. P.-Cambridge, 1877) Comments: Endemic to India

XL.d. Genus Nilus O. P.-Cambridge, 1876

1. Nilus marginatus (Simon, 1888) Comments: Endemic to Andaman & Nicobar Islands
2. Nilus spadicarius (Simon, 1897) Comments: Endemic to India

XL.e. Genus Perenethis L. Koch, 1878

1. Perenethis sindica (Simon, 1897) Distribution: India, Sri Lanka, Nepal, Philippines

XL.f. Genus Pisaura Simon, 1885

1. Pisaura bobbiliensis Reddy & Patel, 1993 Comments: Endemic to India
2. Pisaura decorata Patel & Reddy, 1990 Comments: Endemic to India
3. Pisaura gitae Tikader, 1970 Comments: Endemic to India
4. Pisaura podilensis Patel & Reddy, 1990 Comments: Endemic to India
5. Pisaura putiana Barrion & Litsinger, 1995 Distribution: India, Philippines
6. Pisaura swamii Patel, 1987 Comments: Endemic to India

XL.g. Genus Thalassius Simon, 1885 = Nilus O. Pickard-Cambridge, 1876

1. Thalassius albocinctus (Doleschall, 1859) = Nilus albocinctus (Doleschall, 1859) Distribution: Myanmar to Philippines
2. Thalassius phipsoni F.O.P.-Cambridge, 1898 = Nilus phipsoni (F. O. Pickard-Cambridge, 1898) Distribution: India to China

XL.h. Genus Tinus F.O.P.-Cambridge, 1901

1. Tinus chandrakantii Reddy & Patel, 1993 Comments: Endemic to India
2. Tinus sikkimus Tikader, 1970 Comments: Endemic to India

== XLI. Family Prodidomidae Simon, 1884 ==
The family is no longer recognized by the World Spider Catalog; all species are placed in Gnaphosidae.

XLI.a. Genus Prodidomus Hentz, 1847

1. Prodidomus chaperi (Simon, 1884) Comments: Endemic to India
2. Prodidomus palkai Cooke, 1972 Comments: Endemic to India
3. Prodidomus papavanasanemensis Cooke, 1972 Comments: Endemic to India
4. Prodidomus saharanpurensis (Tikader, 1982) Tikader, 1982 Comments: Endemic to India.
5. Prodidomus sirohi Platnick, 1976 Comments: Endemic to India
6. Prodidomus tirumalai Cooke, 1972 Comments: Endemic to India
7. Prodidomus venkateswarai Cooke, 1972 Comments: Endemic to India

XLI.b. Genus Zimiris Simon, 1882

1. Zimiris diffusa Platnick & Penney, 2004 Distribution: India, St. Helena, Socotra
2. Zimiris doriai Simon, 1882 Distribution: India, Sudan, Yemen

== XLII. Family Psechridae Simon, 1890 ==
XLII.a. Genus Fecenia Simon, 1887

1. Fecenia nicobarensis (Tikader, 1977) Comments: Endemic to Andaman & Nicobar Islands.
2. Fecenia travancoria Pocock, 1899 Distribution: India to Sumatra

XLII.b. Genus Psechrus Thorell, 1878

1. Psechrus ghecuanus Thorell, 1897 Distribution: India, Myanmar, Thailand, China
2. Psechrus himalayanus Simon, 1906 Distribution: India, Nepal Comments: Endemic to South Asia
3. Psechrus torvus (O.P.-Cambridge, 1869) Distribution: Sri Lanka, India, China, Taiwan

== XLIII. Family Salticidae Blackwall, 1841 ==
XLIII.a. Genus Aelurillus Simon, 1884

1. Aelurillus improvisus Azarkina, 2002 Comments: Endemic to India
2. Aelurillus minimontanus Azarkina, 2002 Comments: Endemic to India
3. Aelurillus quadrimaculatus Simon, 1889 Distribution: India, Sri Lanka Comments: Endemic to South Asia

XLIII.b. Genus Asemonea O.P.-Cambridge, 1869

1. Asemonea santinagarensis (Biswas & Biswas, 1992) Comments: Endemic to India.
2. Asemonea tenuipes (O.P.-Cambridge, 1869) Distribution: Sri Lanka to Thailand

XLIII.c. Genus Bavia

1. Bavia kairali (Lucas, 1846) Distribution: Endemic to India.

XLIII.c. Genus Bianor Peckham & Peckham, 1886

1. Bianor albobimaculatus (Lucas, 1846) Distribution: South Africa, Mediterranean to Central Asia
2. Bianor angulosus (Karsch, 1879) Distribution: India, Bhutan, Sri Lanka, Thailand, Vietnam
3. Bianor incitatus Thorell, 1890 Distribution: India to China, Java, Sumatra, Caroline Islands
4. Bianor narmadaensis (Tikader), 1975 Comments: Endemic to India
5. Bianor pashanensis (Tikader), 1975 Comments: Endemic to India
6. Bianor pseudomaculatus Logunov, 2001 Distribution: India, Bhutan, Vietnam
7. Bianor punjabicus Logunov, 2001 Distribution: India, Afghanistan

XLIII.d. Genus Brettus Thorell, 1895

1. Brettus albolimbatus Simon, 1900 Distribution: India, China
2. Brettus anchorum Wanless, 1979 Distribution: India, Nepal Comments: Endemic to South Asia

XLIII.e. Genus Bristowia Reimoser, 1934 Comments: Monotypic genus.

1. Bristowia heterospinosa Reimoser, 1934 Distribution: India, China, Korea, Vietnam, Japan, Krakatau

XLIII.f. Genus Carrhotus Thorell, 1891

1. Carrhotus sannio (Thorell, 1877) Distribution: India to Sulawesi
2. Carrhotus tristis Thorell, 1895 Distribution: India, Myanmar
3. Carrhotus viduus (C.L. Koch, 1846) Distribution: India to China, Java

XLIII.g. Genus Chalcoscirtus Bertkau, 1880

1. Chalcoscirtus glacialis Caporiacco, 1935 Distribution: Russia to India and Alaska
2. Chalcoscirtus martensi Zabka, 1980 Distribution: Central Asia, Nepal, India, China

XLIII.h. Genus Chalcotropis Simon, 1902

1. Chalcotropis pennata Simon, 1902 Comments: Endemic to India

XLIII.i. Genus Colaxes Simon, 1900 Comments: Endemic to South Asia.

1. Colaxes nitidiventris Simon, 1900 Comments: Endemic to India

XLIII.j. Genus Cosmophasis Simon, 1901

1. Cosmophasis miniaceomicans (Simon, 1888) Comments: Endemic to Andaman & Nicobar Islands

XLIII.k. Genus Curubis Simon, 1902 Comments: Endemic to South Asia.

1. Curubis sipeki Dobroruka, 2004 Comments: Endemic to India.

XLIII.l. Genus Cyrba Simon, 1876

1. Cyrba ocellata (Kroneberg, 1875) Distribution: Somalia, Central Asia to Australia

XLIII.m. Genus Cytaea Keyserling, 1882

1. Cytaea albolimbata Simon, 1888 Comments: Endemic to Andaman & Nicobar Islands

XLIII.n. Genus Dexippus Thorell, 1891

1. Dexippus topali Prószyn’ski, 1992 Comments: Endemic to India

XLIII.o. Genus Epeus Peckham & Peckham, 1886

1. Epeus albus Prószyn’ski, 1992 Comments: Endemic to India
2. Epeus chilapataensis (Biswas & Biswas, 1992) Comments: Endemic to India.
3. Epeus indicus Prószyn’ski, 1992 Comments: Endemic to India

XLIII.p. Genus Epocilla Thorell, 1887

1. Epocilla aurantiaca (Simon, 1885) Distribution: India to Malaysia
2. Epocilla xylina Simon, 1906 Comments: Endemic to India

XLIII.q. Genus Euophrys C. L. Koch, 1834

1. Euophrys chiriatapuensis Tikader, 1977 Comments: Endemic to India
2. Euophrys minuta Prószyn’ski, 1992 Comments: Endemic to India

XLIII.r. Genus Ghumattus Prószyn’ski, 1992 Comments: Monotypic Genus and endemic to India.

1. Ghumattus primus Prószyn’ski, 1992 Comments: Endemic to India

XLIII.s. Genus Habrocestoides Prószyn’ski, 1992 Comments: Endemic to South Asia.

1. Habrocestoides bengalensis Prószyn’ski, 1992 Comments: Endemic to India
2. Habrocestoides darjeelingus Logunov, 1999 Comments: Endemic to India.
3. Habrocestoides indicus Prószyn’ski, 1992 Comments: Endemic to India.
4. Habrocestoides micans Logunov, 1999 Comments: Endemic to India.
5. Habrocestoides nitidus Logunov, 1999 Comments: Endemic to India

XLIII.t. Genus Harmochirus Simon, 1885

1. Harmochirus brachiatus (Thorell, 1977) Distribution: India, Bhutan to Taiwan, Indonesia
2. Harmochirus lloydi Narayan, 1915 Comments: Endemic to India
3. Harmochirus zabkai Logunov, 2001 Distribution: India, Nepal, Vietnam

XLIII.u. Genus Hasarius Simon, 1871

1. Hasarius adansoni (Audouin, 1826) Distribution: Cosmopolitan

XLIII.v. Genus Heliophanoides Prószyn’ski, 1992 Comments: Endemic to South Asia.

1. Heliophanoides epigynalis Prószyn’ski, 1992 Comments: Endemic to India
2. Heliophanoides spermathecalis Prószyn’ski, 1992 Comments: Endemic to India

XLIII.w. Genus Hindumanes Logunov, 2004 Comments: Monotypic Genus and endemic to India.

1. Hindumanes karnatakaensis (Tikader & Biswas, 1978) Comments: Endemic to India

XLIII.x. Genus Hispo Simon, 1885

1. Hispo bipartita Simon, 1903 Distribution: India, Sri Lanka Comments: Endemic to South Asia

XLIII.y. Genus Hyllus C.L. Koch, 1846

1. Hyllus bos (Sundevall, 1833) Comments: Endemic to India
2. Hyllus pudicus Thorell, 1895 Distribution: India, Myanmar
3. Hyllus manu John T. D. Caleb, Christudhas A., Laltanpuii, K. & Chitra, M, 2014 Distribution: Chennai
4. Hyllus semicupreus (Simon, 1885) Distribution: India, Sri Lanka Comments: Endemic to South Asia.

XLIII.z. Genus Imperceptus Prószyn’ski, 1992 Comments: Monotypic Genus and endemic to India.

1. Imperceptus minutus Prószyn’ski, 1992 Comments: Endemic to India

XLIII.aa. Genus Jajpurattus Prószyn’ski, 1992 Comments: Monotypic Genus and endemic to India.

1. Jajpurattus incertus Prószyn’ski, 1992 Comments: Endemic to India

XLIII.ab. Genus Langona Simon, 1901

1. Langona goaensis Prószyn’ski, 1992 Comments: Endemic to India.
2. Langona kurracheensis Heciak & Prószyn’ski, 1983 Comments: Endemic to India
3. Langona simoni Heciak & Prószyn’ski, 1983 Comments: Endemic to India
4. Langona tigrina (Simon, 1885) Comments: Endemic to India

XLIII.ac. Genus Madhyattus Prószyn’ski, 1992 Comments: Monotypic Genus and endemic to India.

1. Madhyattus jabalpurensis Prószyn’ski, 1992 Comments: Endemic to India

XLIII.ad. Genus Marpissa C.L. Koch, 1846

1. Marpissa anusuae Tikader & Biswas, 1981 Comments: Endemic to India
2. Marpissa arambagensis Biswas & Biswas, 1992 Comments: Endemic to India
3. Marpissa dayapurensis Majumder, 2004 Comments: Endemic to India
4. Marpissa decorata Tikader, 1974 Comments: Endemic to India
5. Marpissa endenae Biswas & Biswas, 1992 Comments: Endemic to India
6. Marpissa kalapani Tikader, 1977 Comments: Endemic to Andaman & Nicobar Islands
7. Marpissa kalighatensis Biswas & Biswas, 1992 Comments: Endemic to Andaman & Nicobar Islands
8. Marpissa lakhmikantapursansis Majumder, 2004 Comments: Endemic to India
9. Marpissa manipuriensis Biswas & Biswas, 2004 Comments: Endemic to India
10. Marpissa nutanae Biswas & Biswas, 1984 Comments: Endemic to Andaman & Nicobar Islands
11. Marpissa prathamae Biswas & Biswas, 1984 Comments: Endemic to Andaman & Nicobar Islands
12. Marpissa singhi Monga, Singh & Sadana, 1989 Comments: Endemic to Andaman & Nicobar Islands
13. Marpissa tigrina Tikader, 1965 Comments: Endemic to Andaman & Nicobar Islands
14. Marpissa tikaderi Biswas, 1984 Comments: Endemic to Andaman & Nicobar Islands

XLIII.ae. Genus Menemerus Simon, 1868

1. Menemerus albocinctus Keyserling, 1890 Comments: Endemic to Andaman & Nicobar Islands
2. Menemerus bivittatus (Dufour, 1831) Distribution: Pantropical
3. Menemerus brachygnathus (Thorell, 1887) Distribution: India to Japan
4. Menemerus brevibulbis (Thorell, 1887) Distribution: Senegal to India
5. Menemerus fulvus (L. Koch, 1878) Distribution: India to Japan

XLIII.af. Genus Modunda Simon, 1901

1. Modunda staintoni (O.P.-Cambridge, 1872) Distribution: Egypt to India

XLIII.ag. Genus Myrmarachne MacLeay, 1839

1. Myrmarachne bengalensis Tikader, 1973 Comments: Endemic to India
2. Myrmarachne calcuttaensis Biswas, 1984 Comments: Endemic to India
3. Myrmarachne dirangicus Bastawade, 2002 Comments: Endemic to India
4. Myrmarachne himalayensis Narayan, 1915 Comments: Endemic to India
5. Myrmarachne hidaspis Caporiacco, 1935 Comments: Endemic to India.
6. Myrmarachne incerta Narayan, 1915 Comments: Endemic to India
7. Myrmarachne jajpurensis Prószyn’ski, 1992 Comments: Endemic to India
8. Myrmarachne laeta (Thorell, 1887) Distribution: India, Nias Island, China
9. a. M. laeta flava Narayan, 1915 Comments: Endemic to India
10. Myrmarachne ludhianaensis Sadana & Gupta, 1998 Comments: Endemic to India
11. Myrmarachne manducator (Westwood, 1841) Distribution: India, Myanmar, Malaysia, Sumatra
12. Myrmarachne maratha Tikader, 1973 Comments: Endemic to India
13. Myrmarachne megachelae Ganesh Kumar & Mahanasundaram, 1998 Comments: Endemic to India
14. Myrmarachne opaca (Karsch, 1880) Comments: Endemic to India
15. Myrmarachne orientales Tikader, 1973 Distribution: Pakistan, India Comments: Endemic to South Asia
16. Myrmarachne paivae Narayan, 1915 Comments: Endemic to India
17. Myrmarachne plataleoides (O.P.-Cambridge, 1869) Distribution: India, Sri Lanka, China, Southeast Asia
18. Myrmarachne platypalpus Bradoo, 1980 Comments: Endemic to India
19. Myrmarachne poonaensis Tikader, 1973 Comments: Endemic to India
20. Myrmarachne providens (Peckham & Peckham, 1892) Distribution: India, Sri Lanka Comments: Endemic to South Asia
21. Myrmarachne ramunni Narayan, 1915 Comments: Endemic to India
22. Myrmarachne roeweri Reimoser, 1934 Comments: Endemic to India
23. Myrmarachne satarensis Narayan, 1915 Comments: Endemic to India
24. Myrmarachne transversa (Mukerjee, 1930) Comments: Endemic to India.
25. Myrmarachne tristis (Simon, 1882) Distribution: Libya to India
26. Myrmarachne uniseriata Narayan, 1915 Comments: Endemic to India

XLIII.ah. Genus Onomastus Simon, 1900

1. Onomastus patellaris Simon, 1900 Comments: Endemic to India

XLIII.ai. Genus Orissania Prószyn’ski, 1992 Comments: Monotypic Genus and endemic to India.

1. Orissania daitarica Prószyn’ski, 1992 Comments: Endemic to India

XLIII.aj. Genus Pancorius Simon, 1902

1. Pancorius dabanis (Hogg, 1922) Comments: Endemic to India.
2. Pancorius darjeelingianus Prószyn’ski, 1992 Comments: Endemic to India
3. Pancorius magnus Zabka, 1985 Distribution: India, Vietnam
4. Pancorius submontanus Prószyn’ski, 1992 Comments: Endemic to India
5. Pancorius tagorei Prószyn’ski, 1992 Comments: Endemic to India

XLIII.ak. Genus Pandisus Simon, 1900

1. Pandisus indicus Prószyn’ski, 1992 Comments: Endemic to India

XLIII.al. Genus Panysinus Simon, 1901

1. Panysinus grammicus Simon, 1902 Comments: Endemic to India

XLIII.am. Genus Pellenes Simon, 1876

1. Pellenes allegrii Caporiacco, 1935 Distribution: Central Asia, India

XLIII.an. Genus Phaeacius Simon, 1900

1. Phaeacius lancearius (Thorell, 1895) Distribution: India, Myanmar

XLIII.ao. Genus Phidippus C. L. Koch, 1846

1. Phidippus bengalensis Tikader, 1977 Comments: Endemic to India
2. Phidippus bhimrakshiti Gajbe, 2004 Comments: Endemic to India
3. Phidippus calcuttaensis Biswas, 1984 Comments: Endemic to India
4. Phidippus khandalaensis Tikader, 1977 Comments: Endemic to India
5. Phidippus punjabensis Tikader, 1974 Comments: Endemic to India
6. Phidippus yashodharae Tikader, 1977 Comments: Endemic to Andaman & Nicobar Islands

XLIII.ap. Genus Phintella Strand, 1906

1. Phintella accentifera (Simon, 1901) Distribution: India, China, Vietnam
2. Phintella alboterminus John T. D. Caleb, 2014 Distribution: Chennai
3. Phintella assamica Prószyn’ski, 1992 Comments: Endemic to India
4. Phintella bifurcata Prószyn’ski, 1992 Comments: Endemic to India
5. Phintella coonooriensis Prószyn’ski, 1992 Comments: Endemic to India
6. Phintella debilis (Thorell, 1891) Distribution: India to Java
7. Phintella indica (Simon, 1901) Comments: Endemic to India.
8. Phintella macrops (Simon, 1901) Comments: Endemic to India.
9. Phintella mussooriensis Prószyn’ski, 1992 Comments: Endemic to India
10. Phintella nilgirica Prószyn’ski, 1992 Comments: Endemic to India
11. Phintella reinhardti (Thorell, 1891) Comments: Endemic Andaman & Nicobar Islands.
12. Phintella suknana Prószyn’ski, 1992 Comments: Endemic to India
13. Phintella vittata (C.L. Koch, 1846) Distribution: India to Philippines

XLIII.aq. Genus Phlegra Simon, 1876

1. Phlegra dhakuriensis (Tikader, 1974) Distribution: India, Pakistan Comments: Endemic to South Asia.

XLIII.ar. Genus Pilia Simon, 1902

1. Pilia saltabunda Simon, 1902 Comments: Endemic to India

XLIII.as. Genus Piranthus Thorell, 1895

1. Piranthus casteti Simon, 1900 Comments: Endemic to India

XLIII.at. Genus Plexippus C.L. Koch, 1846

1. Plexippus andamanensis (Tikader, 1977) Comments: Endemic to Andaman & Nicobar Islands.
2. Plexippus calcutaensis (Tikader, 1974) Distribution: India, Philippines
3. Plexippus paykulli (Audouin, 1826) Distribution: Cosmopolitan
4. Plexippus petersi (Karsch, 1878) Distribution: Africa to Japan, Philippines, Hawaii
5. Plexippus redimitus Simon, 1902 Distribution: India, Sri Lanka

XLIII.au. Genus Portia Karsch, 1878

1. Portia albimana (Simon, 1900) Distribution: India to Vietnam
2. Portia assamensis Wanless, 1978 Distribution: India to Malaysia

XLIII.av. Genus Pseudamycus Simon, 1885

1. Pseudamycus himalaya (Tikader, 1967) Comments: Endemic to India.

XLIII.aw. Genus Pseudicius Simon, 1885

1. Pseudicius andamanius (Tikader, 1977) Comments: Endemic to Andaman & Nicobar Islands.
2. Pseudicius daitaricus Prószyn’ski, 1992 Comments: Endemic to India
3. Pseudicius frigidus (O.P.-Cambridge, 1885) Distribution: Afghanistan, Pakistan, India, China
4. Pseudicius ludhianaensis (Tikader, 1974) Comments: Endemic to India.
5. Pseudicius modestus Simon, 1885 Comments: Endemic to India
6. Pseudicius nepalicus (Andreeva, Heciak & Prószyn’ski, 1984) Distribution:India, Nepal Comments: Endemic to South Asia

XLIII.ax. Genus Rhene Thorell, 1869

1. Rhene albigera (C.L. Koch, 1846) Distribution: India to Sumatra
2. Rhene callida Peckham & Peckham, 1895 Comments: Endemic to India
3. Rhene callosa (Peckham & Peckham, 1895) Comments: Endemic to India
4. Rhene citri (Sadana, 1991) Comments: Endemic to India
5. Rhene daitarensis Prószyn’ski, 1992 Comments: Endemic to India
6. Rhene danieli Tikader, 1973 Comments: Endemic to India
7. Rhene darjeelingiana Prószyn’ski, 1992 Comments: Endemic to India
8. Rhene decorata Tikader, 1977 Synonym: Rhene decoratus Tikader, 1977 Comments: Endemic to India.
9. Rhene flavicomans Simon, 1902 Distribution: India, Bhutan, Sri Lanka Comments: Endemic to South Asia
10. Rhene haldanei Gajbe, 2004 Comments: Endemic to India
11. Rhene indica Tikader, 1973 Distribution: India, China
12. Rhene khandalaensis Tikader, 1977 Comments: Endemic to India
13. Rhene mus (Simon, 1889) Comments: Endemic to India
14. Rhene pantharae Biswas & Biswas, 1992 Comments: Endemic to India
15. Rhene sanghrakshiti Gajbe, 2004 Comments: Endemic to India
16. Rhene rubrigera (Thorell, 1887) Distribution: India to China, Sumatra

XLIII.ay. Genus Saitis Simon, 1876

1. Saitis chaperi Simon, 1885 Distribution: India, Sri Lanka Comments: Endemic to South Asia

XLIII.az. Genus Similaria Prószyn’ski, 1992 Comments: Monotypic Genus and endemic to India.

1. Similaria enigmatica Prószyn’ski, 1992 Comments: Endemic to India

XLIII.ba. Genus Sitticus Simon, 1901

1. Sitticus diductus (O.P.-Cambridge, 1885) Distribution: India, China

XLIII.bb. Genus Stenaelurillus Simon, 1885

1. Stenaelurillus lesserti Reimoser, 1934 Comments: Endemic to India

XLIII.bc Genus Telamonia Thorell, 1887

1. Telamonia dimidiata (Simon, 1899) Distribution: India, Bhutan, Sumatra
2. Telamonia peckhami Thorell, 1891 Comments: Endemic to Andaman & Nicobar Islands.
3. Telamonia sikkimensis (Tikader, 1967) Comments: Endemic to India.

XLIII.bd. Genus Thiania C. L. Koch, 1846

1. Thiania bhamoensis Thorell, 1887 Distribution: Myanmar to Sumatra

XLIII.be. Genus Thyene Simon, 1885

1. Thyene imperialis (Rossi, 1846) Distribution: Old World

XLIII.bf. Genus Viciria Thorell, 1877

1. Viciria diademata Simon, 1902 Comments: Endemic to India
2. Viciria diatreta Simon, 1902 Comments: Endemic to India
3. Viciria minima Reimoser, 1934 Comments: Endemic to India

XLIII.bg. Genus Yaginumaella Prószyn’ski, 1979

1. Yaginumaella senchalensis Prószyn’ski, 1992 Comments: Endemic to India

XLIII.bh. Genus Yllenus Simon, 1868

1. Yllenus baltistanus Caporiacco, 1935 Comments: Endemic to India
2. Yllenus karnai Logunov & Marusik, 2003 Comments: Endemic to India

XLIII.bi. Genus Zeuxippus Thorell, 1891

1. Zeuxippus histrio Thorell, 1891 Comments: Endemic to India

== XLIV. Family Scytodidae Blackwall, 1864 ==
XLIV.a. Genus Scytodes Latreille, 1804

1. Scytodes alfredi Gajbe, 2004 Comments: Endemic to India
2. Scytodes fusca Walckenaer, 1837 Distribution: Pantropical
3. Scytodes gilva (Thorell, 1887) Distribution: India, Myanmar
4. Scytodes kinsukus Patel, 1975 Comments: Endemic to India
5. Scytodes mawphlongensis Tikader, 1966 Comments: Endemic to India
6. Scytodes pallida Doleschall, 1859 Distribution: India, China, Philippines, New Guinea
7. Scytodes propinqua Stoliczka, 1869 Comments: Endemic to India
8. Scytodes stoliczkai Simon, 1897 Comments: Endemic to India.
9. Scytodes thoracica (Latreille, 1802) Distribution: Holarctic, Pacific Island

== XLV. Family Segestriidae Simon, 1893 ==
XLV.a. Genus Ariadna Audouin, 1826

1. Ariadna nebulosa Simon, 1906 Comments: Endemic to India

XLV.b. Genus Segestria Latreille, 1804

1. Segestria inda Simon, 1906 Comments: Endemic to India

== XLVI. Family Selenopidae Simon, 1897 ==
XLVI.a. Genus Selenops Latreille, 1819

1. Selenops agumbensis Tikader, 1969 Comments: Endemic to India
2. Selenops montigenus Simon, 1889 Comments: Endemic to India
3. Selenops nilgirensis Reimoser, 1934 Comments: Endemic to India
4. Selenops radiatus Latreille, 1819 Distribution: Mediterranean, Africa, India, Myanmar
5. Selenops shevaroyensis Gravely, 1931 Comments: Endemic to India
6. Selenops sumitrae Patel & Patel, 1973 Comments: Endemic to India

== XLVII. Family Sicariidae Keyserling, 1880 ==
XLVII.a. Genus Loxosceles Heineken & Lowe, 1832

1. Loxosceles rufescens (Dufour, 1820) Distribution: Cosmopolitan

== XLVIII. Family Sparassidae Bertkau, 1872 ==
XLVIII.a. Genus Bhutaniella Jäger, 2000 Comments: Endemic to South Asia.

1. Bhutaniella sikkimensis (Gravely, 1931) Comments: Endemic to India.

XLVIII.b. Genus Gnathopalystes Rainbow, 1899

1. Gnathopalystes kochi (Simon, 1880) Distribution: India, Myanmar, Malaysia, Java, Sumatra, Borneo

XLVIII.c. Genus Heteropoda Latreille, 1804

1. Heteropoda afghana Roewer, 1962 Distribution: Afghanistan, Pakistan, India
2. Heteropoda altithorax Strand, 1907 Comments: Endemic to India
3. Heteropoda andamanensis Tikader, 1977 Comments: Endemic to Andaman & Nicobar Islands
4. Heteropoda bhaikakai Patel & Patel, 1973 Comments: Endemic to India
5. Heteropoda buxa Saha, Biswas & Raychaudhuri, 1995 Comments: Endemic to India.
6. Heteropoda emarginativulva Strand, 1907 Comments: Endemic to India
7. Heteropoda fabrei Simon, 1885 Comments: Endemic to India
8. Heteropoda fischeri Jäger, 2005 Comments: Endemic to India
9. Heteropoda gourae Monga, Sadana & Singh, 1988 Comments: Endemic to India
10. Heteropoda hampsoni Pocock, 1901 Comments: Endemic to India
11. Heteropoda kandiana Pocock, 1899 Distribution: India, Sri Lanka Comments:Endemic to South Asia
12. Heteropoda kuluensis Sethi & Tikader, 1988 Comments: Endemic to India
13. Heteropoda lentula Pocock, 1901 Comments: Endemic to India
14. Heteropoda leprosa Simon, 1884 Distribution: India, Myanmar, Malaysia
15. Heteropoda lunula (Doleschall, 1857) Distribution: India to Vietnam, Malaysia, Java, Sumatra, Borneo
16. Heteropoda malitiosa Simon, 1906 Comments: Endemic to India
17. Heteropoda merkarensis Strand, 1907 Comments: Endemic to India
18. Heteropoda nicobarensis Tikader, 1977 Comments: Endemic to Andaman & Nicobar Islands
19. Heteropoda nilgirina Pocock, 1901 Comments: Endemic to India
20. Heteropoda nirounensis (Simon, 1903) Distribution: India, Sumatra
21. Heteropoda pedata Strand, 1907 Comments: Endemic to India
22. a. H. pedata magna Strand, 1909 Comments: Endemic to India
23. Heteropoda phasma Simon, 1897 Comments: Endemic to India
24. Heteropoda robusta Fage, 1924 Comments: Endemic to India
25. Heteropoda rufognatha Strand, 1907 Comments: Endemic to India
26. Heteropoda sexpunctata Simon, 1885 Distribution: India, Malaysia
27. Heteropoda shillongensis Sethi & Tikader, 1988 Comments: Endemic to India
28. Heteropoda straminiosa Kundu, Biswas & Raychaudhuri, 1999 Comments: Endemic to India
29. Heteropoda striatipes (Leardi, 1902) Comments: Endemic to India
30. Heteropoda subplebeia Strand, 1907 Comments: Endemic to India
31. Heteropoda veiliana Strand, 1907 Comments: Endemic to India
32. Heteropoda venatoria (Linnaeus, 1767) Distribution: Pantropical
33. Heteropoda warthiana Strand, 1907 Comments: Endemic to India

XLVIII.d. Genus Olios Walckenaer, 1837

1. Olios admiratus (Pocock, 1901) Comments: Endemic to India.
2. Olios bhavnagarensis Sethi & Tikader, 1988 Comments: Endemic to India
3. Olios fuligineus (Pocock, 1901) Comments: Endemic to India.
4. Olios gravelyi Sethi & Tikader, 1988 Comments: Endemic to India
5. Olios hampsoni (Pocock, 1901) Comments: Endemic to India.
6. Olios iranii (Pocock, 1901) Distribution: India, Pakistan comments: Endemic to South Asia.
7. Olios kiranae Sethi & Tikader, 1988 Comments: Endemic to India
8. Olios lamarcki (Latreille, 1806) Distribution: Madagascar to Sri Lanka, India
9. Olios milleti (Pocock, 1901) Distribution: India, Sri Lanka Comments: Endemic to South Asia.
10. Olios obesulus (Pocock, 1901) Comments: Endemic to India.
11. Olios patagiatus (Simon, 1897) Comments: Endemic to India.
12. Olios phipsoni (Pocock, 1899) Comments: Endemic to India.
13. Olios pyrozonis (Pocock, 1901) Comments: Endemic to India.
14. Olios rosettii (Leardi, 1901) Comments: Endemic to India
15. Olios rotundiceps (Pocock, 1901) Comments: Endemic to India.
16. Olios sanguinifrons (Simon, 1906) Comments: Endemic to India.
17. Olios senilis Simon, 1880 Distribution: India, Sri Lanka Comments: Endemic to South Asia.
18. Olios stimulator (Simon, 1897) Comments: Endemic to India.
19. Olios striatus (Blackwall, 1867) Comments: Endemic to India.
20. Olios tarandus (Simon, 1897) Comments: Endemic to India.
21. Olios tener (Thorell, 1891) Distribution: Pakistan, India, Myanmar
22. Olios tikaderi Kundu, Biswas & Raychaudhuri, 1999 Comments: Endemic to India
23. Olios wroughtoni (Simon, 1897) Comments: Endemic to India.
24. Olios xerxes (Pocock, 1901) Distribution: Iran to India

XLVIII.e. Genus Palystes L. Koch, 1875

1. Palystes flavidus Simon, 1897 Comments: Endemic to India

XLVIII.f. Genus Pandercetes L. Koch, 1875

1. Pandercetes celatus Pocock, 1899 Comments: Endemic to India
2. Pandercetes decipiens Pocock, 1899 Distribution: India, Sri Lanka Comments: Endemic to South Asia

XLVIII.g. Genus Pseudopoda Jäger, 2000

1. Pseudopoda abnormis Jäger, 2001 Comments: Endemic to India
2. Pseudopoda akashi (Sethi & Tikader, 1988) Comments: Endemic to India.
3. Pseudopoda casaria (Simon, 1897) Comments: Endemic to India
4. Pseudopoda hingstoni Jäger, 2001 Comments: Endemic to India
5. Pseudopoda lutea (Thorell, 1895) Distribution: India, Myanmar
6. Pseudopoda minor Jäger, 2001 Comments: Endemic to India
7. Pseudopoda prompta (O.P.-Cambridge, 1885) Distribution: India, Pakistan Comments: Endemic to South Asia.

XLVIII.h. Genus Seramba Thorell, 1887

1. Seramba bifasciata Thorell, 1891 Comments: Endemic to Andaman & Nicobar Islands

XLVIII.i. Genus Spariolenus Simon, 1880

1. Spariolenus megalopis Thorell, 1891 Comments: Endemic to Andaman & Nicobar Islands
2. Spariolenus minusculus (Reimoser, 1934) Comments: Endemic to India.
3. Spariolenus tigris Simon, 1880 Distribution: India, Pakistan, Malaysia

XLVIII.j. Genus Thelcticopis Karsch, 1884

1. Thelcticopis ajax Pocock, 1901 Comments: Endemic to India
2. Thelcticopis bicornuta Pocock, 1901 Comments: Endemic to India
3. Thelcticopis canescens Simon, 1887Distribution: India, Myanmar
4. Thelcticopis maindroni Simon, 1906 Comments: Endemic to India
5. Thelcticopis rufula Pocock, 1901 Comments: Endemic to India
6. Thelcticopis serambiformis Strand, 1907 Comments: Endemic to India
7. Thelcticopis virescens Pocock, 1901 Comments: Endemic to India

== XLIX. Family Stenochilidae Thorell, 1873 ==
XLIX.a. Genus Stenochilus O. P.-Cambridge, 1870

1. Stenochilus hobsoni O. P.-Cambridge, 1870 Comments: Endemic to India
2. Stenochilus scutulatus Platnick & Shadab, 1974 Comments: Endemic to India

== L. Family Tetrablemmidae O.P.-cambridge, 1873 ==
L.a. Genus Brignoliella Shear, 1978

1. Brignoliella besuchetiana Bourne, 1980 Comments: Endemic to India

L.b. Genus Choiroblemma Bourne, 1980 Comments: Endemic to India.

1. Choiroblemma bengalense Bourne, 1980 Comments: Endemic to India
2. Choiroblemma rhinoxunum Bourne, 1980 Comments: Endemic to India

L.c. Genus Indicoblemma Bourne, 1980 Comments: Monotypic Genus and endemic to India.

1. Indicoblemma sheari Bourne, 1980 Comments: Endemic to India

L.d. Genus Tetrablemma O. P.-Cambridge, 1873

1. Tetrablemma brignolii Lehtinen, 1981 Comments: Endemic to India
2. Tetrablemma deccanense (Tikader, 1976) Comments: Endemic to India.
3. Tetrablemma loebli Bourne, 1980 Comments: Endemic to India
4. Tetrablemma medioculatum O. P.-Cambridge, 1873 Comments: Endemic to South Asia
5. a. T. medioculatum cochinense Lehtinen, 1981 Comments: Endemic to India
6. b. T. medioculatum gangeticum Lehtinen, 1981 Comments: Endemic to India

== LI. Family Tetragnathidae Menge, 1866 ==
LI.a. Genus Guizygiella Zhu, Kim & Song, 1997

1. Guizygiella melanocrania(Thorell, 1887) Distribution: India to China

LI.b. Genus Herennia Thorell, 1877

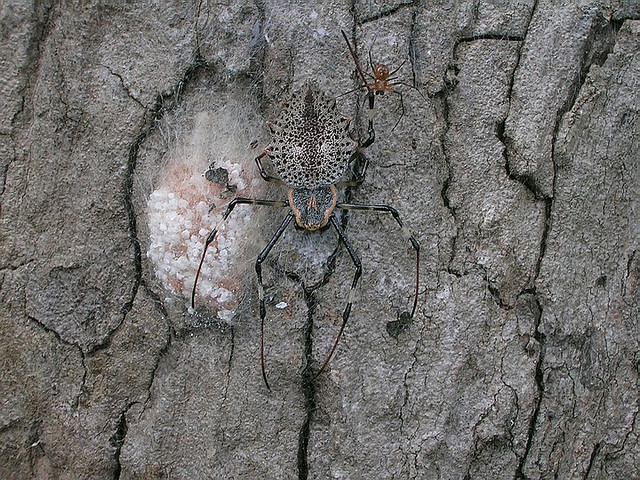
H. ornatissima (Fluted Orb) from BR Hills, Karnataka.

1. Herennia ornatissima (Doleschall, 1859) Distribution: India to China, Malaysia, New Guinea

LI.c. Genus Leucauge White, 1841

1. Leucauge argentata (O. P.-Cambridge, 1869) Distribution: India, Sri Lanka, New Guinea
2. Leucauge beata (Pocock, 1901) Comments: Endemic to India.
3. Leucauge bengalensis Gravely, 1921 Comments: Endemic to India.
4. Leucauge celebesiana (Walckenaer, 1842) Distribution: India to China, Japan, Sulawesi, New Guinea
5. Leucauge decorata (Blackwall, 1864) Distribution: Paleotropical
6. Leucauge dorsotuberculata Tikader, 1982 Comments: Endemic to India
7. Leucauge nicobarica (Thorell, 1891) Comments: Endemic to Andaman & Nicobar Islands
8. Leucauge pondae Tikader, 1970 Comments: Endemic to India
9. Leucauge pusilla (Thorell, 1878) Distribution: India, Amboina
10. Leucauge rubrotrivittata Simon, 1906 Comments: Endemic to India

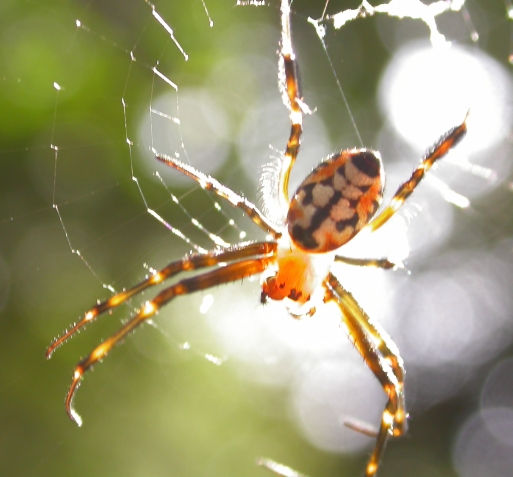
Leucauge tessellata

1. Leucauge tessellata (Thorell, 1887) Distribution: India to Moluccas, Taiwan
2. Leucauge tristicta (Thorell, 1891) Comments: Endemic to Andaman & Nicobar Islands

Genus Mesida Kulczyński, 1911

1. Mesida culta (O. P.-Cambridge, 1869) Distribution: India, Sri Lanka Comments: Endemic to South Asia.

LI.d. Genus Meta C. L. Koch, 1836

1. Meta abdomenalis Patel & Reddy, 1993 Comments: Endemic to India
2. Meta simlaensis Tikader, 1982 Comments: Endemic to India

LI.e. Genus Nephila Leach, 1815

1. Nephila clavata L. Koch, 1878 Distribution: India to Japan
2. Nephila kuhlii (Doleschall, 1859) Distribution: India to Sulawesi
3. Nephila pilipes (Fabricius, 1793) Distribution: China, Philippines to Australia
  1. N. pilipes jalorensis (Simon, 1901) Comments: Endemic to India
4. Nephila robusta Tikader, 1962 Comments: Endemic to India

LI.f. Genus Nephilengys L. Koch, 1872

1. Nephilengys malabarensis (Walckenaer, 1842) Distribution: India to Philippines, Australia

LI.g. Genus Opadometa Archer, 1951

1. Opadometa fastigata (Simon, 1877) Distribution: India to Philippines, Sulawesi

LI.h. Genus Orsinome Thorell, 1890

1. Orsinome armata Pocock, 1901 Comments: Endemic to India
2. Orsinome listeri Gravely, 1921 Comments: Endemic to India
3. Orsinome marmorea Pocock, 1901 Comments: Endemic to India

LI.i. Genus Pachygnatha Sundevall, 1823

1. Pachygnatha silentvalliensis Biswas and Roy, 2004 Comments: Endemic to India

LI.j. Genus Phonognatha Simon, 1894

1. Phonognatha vicitra Sherriffs, 1928 – misidentified; now Acusilas coccineus

LI.k. Genus Tetragnatha Latreille, 1804

1. Tetragnatha andamanensis Tikader, 1977 Comments: Endemic to Andaman & Nicobar Islands
2. Tetragnatha bengalensis Walckenaer, 1842 Comments: Endemic to India
3. Tetragnatha chamberlini (Gajbe, 2004) Comments: Endemic to India
4. Tetragnatha ceylonica O. P.-Cambridge, 1869 Distribution: South Africa, Sri Lanka to Philippines, New Britain
5. Tetragnatha cochinensis Gravely, 1921 Comments: Endemic to India
6. Tetragnatha coelestis Pocock, 1901 Comments: Endemic to India
7. Tetragnatha delumbis Thorell, 1891 Comments: Endemic to Andaman & Nicobar Islands
8. Tetragnatha fletcheri Gravely, 1921 Comments: Endemic to India
9. Tetragnatha foliferens Hingston, 1927 Comments: Endemic to Andaman & Nicobar Islands
10. Tetragnatha foveata Karsch, 1891 Distribution: India, Sri Lanka, Maldives Comments: Endemic to South Asia
11. Tetragnatha geniculata Karsch, 1891 Distribution: Sri Lanka to Thailand
12. Tetragnatha iridescens Stoliczka, 1869 Comments: Endemic to India
13. Tetragnatha isidis (Simon, 1880) Distribution: Europe to Sumatra
14. Tetragnatha javana (Thorell, 1890) Distribution: Africa to Japan, Philippines, Indonesia
15. Tetragnatha mandibulata Walckenaer, 1842 Distribution: West Africa, India to Philippines, Australia
16. Tetragnatha maxillosa Thorell, 1895 Distribution: South Africa, India to Philippines, New Hebrides
17. Tetragnatha paradisea Pocock, 1901 Comments: Endemic to India
18. Tetragnatha parvula Thorell, 1891 Comments: Endemic to Andaman & Nicobar Islands
19. Tetragnatha sutherlandi Gravely, 1921 Comments: Endemic to India
20. Tetragnatha tenera Thorell, 1881 Distribution: India, Sri Lanka, Queensland
21. Tetragnatha vermiformis Emerton, 1884 Distribution: India, USA to Panama, Southern Africa to Japan, Philippines
22. Tetragnatha viridorufa Gravely, 1921 Comments: Endemic to India

LI.l. Genus Tylorida Simon, 1894

1. Tylorida ventralis (Thorell, 1877) Distribution: India to Taiwan, New Guinea

== LII. Family Theraphosidae Thorell, 1870 ==
LII.a. Genus Annandaliella Hirst, 1909 Comments: Endemic to India.

1. Annandaliella pectinifera Gravely, 1935 Comments: Endemic to India

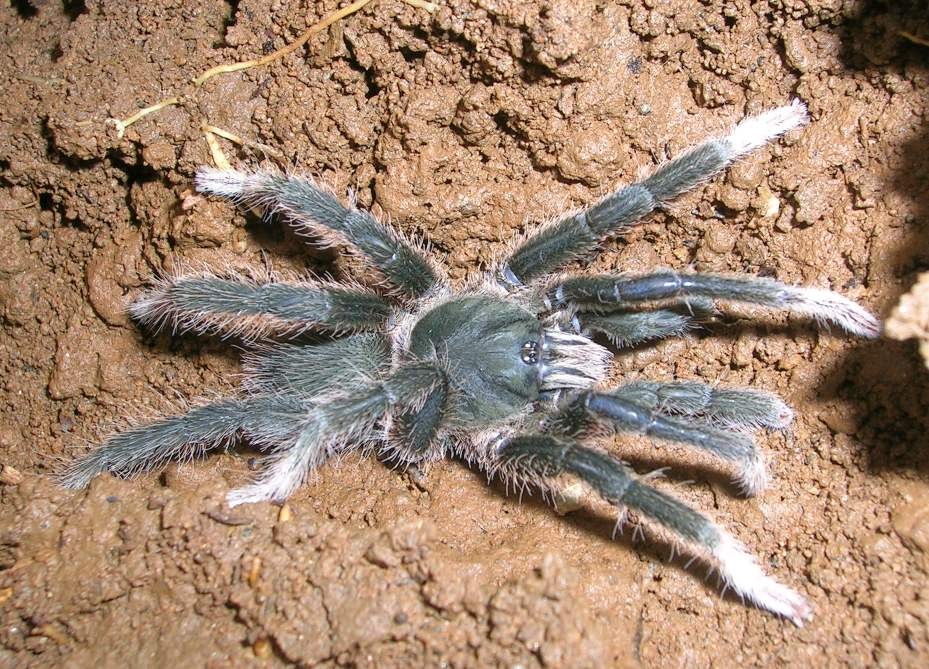
Annandaliella travancorica

1. Annandaliella travancorica Hirst, 1909 Comments: Endemic to India

LII.b. Genus Chilobrachys Karsch, 1891

1. Chilobrachys andersoni (Pocock, 1895) Distribution: India, Myanmar, Malaysia
2. Chilobrachys assamensis Hirst, 1909 Comments: Endemic to India
3. Chilobrachys femoralis Pocock, 1900 Comments: Endemic to India
4. Chilobrachys fimbriatus Pocock, 1899 Comments: Endemic to India
5. Chilobrachys flavopilosus (Simon, 1884) Distribution: India, Myanmar
6. Chilobrachys fumosus (Pocock, 1895) Comments: Endemic to India
7. Chilobrachys hardwicki (Pocock, 1895) Comments: Endemic to India
8. Chilobrachys stridulans (Wood Mason, 1877) Comments: Endemic to India.
9. Chilobrachys thorelli Pocock, 1900 Comments: Endemic to India

LII.c. Genus Haploclastus Simon, 1892

1. Haploclastus cervinus Simon, 1892 Comments: Endemic to India
2. Haploclastus himalayensis (Tikader, 1977) Comments: Endemic to India
3. Haploclastus kayi Gravely, 1915 Comments: Endemic to India
4. Haploclastus nilgirinus Pocock, 1899 Comments: Endemic to India
5. Haploclastus robustus (Pocock, 1899) Comments: Endemic to India
6. Haploclastus satyanus (Barman, 1978) Comments: Endemic to India
7. Haploclastus tenebrosus Gravely, 1935 Comments: Endemic to India
8. Haploclastus validus (Pocock, 1899) Comments: Endemic to India

LII.d. Genus Ischnocolus Ausserer, 1871

1. Ischnocolus decoratus Tikader, 1977 Comments: Endemic to India.
2. Ischnocolus khasiensis Tikader, 1977 Comments: Endemic to India

LII.e. Genus Lyrognathus Pocock, 1895

1. Lyrognathus crotalus Pocock, 1895 Comments: Endemic to India
2. Lyrognathus pugnax Pocock, 1900
3. Lyrognathus saltator Pocock, 1900 Comments: Endemic to India

LII.f. Genus Phlogiellus Pocock, 1897

1. Phlogiellus subarmatus (Thorell, 1891) Comments: Endemic to Andaman & Nicobar Islands.

LII.g. Genus Plesiophrictus Pocock, 1899

1. Plesiophrictus bhori Gravely, 1915 Comments: Endemic to India
2. Plesiophrictus blatteri Gravely, 1935 Comments: Endemic to India
3. Plesiophrictus collinus Pocock, 1899 Comments: Endemic to India
4. Plesiophrictus fabrei (Simon, 1892) Comments: Endemic to India
5. Plesiophrictus linteatus (Simon, 1891)Comments: Endemic to India
6. Plesiophrictus madraspatanus Gravely, 1935 Comments: Endemic to India
7. Plesiophrictus mahabaleshwari Tikader, 1977 Comments: Endemic to India
8. Plesiophrictus meghalayaensis Tikader, 1977 Comments: Endemic to India
9. Plesiophrictus millardi Pocock, 1899 Comments: Endemic to India
10. Plesiophrictus milleti (Pocock, 1900) Comments: Endemic to India
11. Plesiophrictus raja Gravely, 1915 Comments: Endemic to India
12. Plesiophrictus satarensis Gravely, 1915 Comments: Endemic to India
13. Plesiophrictus sericeus Pocock, 1900 Comments: Endemic to India

LII.h. Genus Poecilotheria Simon, 1885 Comments: Endemic to South Asia.

1. Poecilotheria formosa (Pocock, 1899) Comments: Endemic to India
2. Poecilotheria hanumavilasumica (Smith, 2004) Comments: Native to India and Sri Lanka
3. Poecilotheria metallica (Pocock, 1899) Comments: Endemic to India
4. Poecilotheria miranda (Pocock, 1900) Comments: Endemic to India
5. Poecilotheria regalis (Pocock, 1899) Comments: Endemic to India
6. Poecilotheria rufilata (Pocock, 1899) Comments: Endemic to India
7. Poecilotheria striata (Pocock, 1895) Comments: Endemic to India.
8. Poecilotheria tigrinawesseli (Smith, 2006) Comments: Endemic to India.

LII.i. Genus Selenocosmia Ausserer, 1871

1. Selenocosmia himalayana Pocock, 1899 Comments: Endemic to India
2. Selenocosmia javanensis (Walckenaer, 1837) Distribution: India, Malaysia to Sulawesi
3. Selenocosmia kulluensis Chamberlin, 1917 Comments: Endemic to India
4. Selenocosmia sutherlandi Gravely, 1935 Comments: Endemic to India

LII.j. Genus Thrigmopoeus Pocock, 1899 Comments: Endemic to India.

1. Thrigmopoeus insignis Pocock, 1899 Comments: Endemic to India
2. Thrigmopoeus truculentus Pocock, 1899 Comments: Endemic to India.

== LIII. Family Theridiidae Sundevall, 1833 ==
LIII.a. Genus Achaearanea Strand, 1929

1. Achaearanea budana Tikader, 1970 Comments: Endemic to India
2. Achaearanea diglipuriensis Tikader, 1977 Comments: Endemic to Andaman & Nicobar Islands
3. Achaearanea durgae Tikader, 1970 Comments: Endemic to India
4. Achaearanea mundula (L. Koch, 1872) Distribution: India to New Caledonia
5. Achaearanea triangularis Patel nom. nov. 2003 Comments: Endemic to India

LIII.b. Genus Argyrodes Simon, 1864

1. Argyrodes ambalikae Tikader, 1970 Comments: Endemic to India
2. Argyrodes andamanensis Tikader, 1977 Comments: Endemic to Andaman & Nicobar Islands
3. Argyrodes chiriatapuensis Tikader, 1977 Comments: Endemic to Andaman & Nicobar Islands
4. Argyrodes cyrtophorae Tikader, 1963 Synonym: Argyrodes cyrtophore Tikader, 1963 Comments: Endemic to India
5. Argyrodes dipali Tikader, 1963 Comments: Endemic to India
6. Argyrodes fissifrons O.P.-Cambridge, 1869 Distribution: India, Sri Lanka to China, Australia
7. a. A. fissifrons terressae Thorell, 1891 Comments: Endemic to Andaman & Nicobar Islands
8. Argyrodes flagellum (Doleschall, 1857) Distribution: India, Pakistan, Singapore, Australia
9. Argyrodes gazedes Tikader, 1970 Comments: Endemic to India
10. Argyrodes gazingensis Tikader, 1970 Comments: Endemic to India
11. Argyrodes gouri Tikader, 1963 Comments: Endemic to India
12. Argyrodes jamkhedes Tikader, 1963 Comments: Endemic to India
13. Argyrodes projeles Tikader, 1970 Comments: Endemic to India
14. Argyrodes scintillulanus O. P.-Cambridge, 1880 Distribution: India, Sri Lanka Comments: Endemic to South Asia

LIII.c. Genus Ariamnes Thorell, 1869

1. Ariamnes pavesii Leardi, 1902 Distribution: India, Sri Lanka Comments: Endemic to South Asia.
2. Ariamnes simulans O. P.-Cambridge, 1892 Comments: Endemic to India.

LIII.d. Genus Chrysso O.P.-Cambridge, 1882

1. Chrysso picturata (Simon, 1895) Comments: Endemic to India

LIII.e. Genus Cyllognatha L. Koch, 1872

1. Cyllognatha surajbe Patel & Patel, 1972 Comments: Endemic to India

LIII.f. Genus Euryopis Menge, 1868

1. Euryopis nubila Simon, 1889 Comments: Endemic to India

LIII.g. Genus Faiditus Keyserling, 1884

1. Faiditus xiphias Thorell, 1887 Distribution: Myanmar, India to Japan, Krakatau

LIII.h. Genus Latrodectus Walckenaer, 1805

1. Latrodectus hasselti Thorell, 1870 Distribution: India, Southeast Asia to Australia, New Zealand

LIII.i. Genus Moneta O.P.-Cambridge, 1870

1. Moneta grandis Simon, 1905 Comments: Endemic to India

LIII.j. Genus Phoroncidia Westwood, 1835

1. Phoroncidia aculeata Westwood, 1835 Comments: Endemic to India
2. Phoroncidia maindroni (Simon, 1905) Comments: Endemic to India
3. Phoroncidia testudo (O.P.-Cambridge, 1873) Distribution: India, Sri Lanka Comments: Endemic to South Asia

LIII.k. Genus Phycosoma O.P.-Cambridge, 1879

1. Phycosoma martinae (Roberts, 1983) Distribution: India, Aldabra, China, Korea, Ryūkyū Is., Philippines

LIII.l. Genus Propostira Simon, 1894 Comment: Endemic to South Asia.

1. Propostira quadrangulata Simon, 1894 Distribution: India, Sri Lanka Comments: Endemic to South Asia
2. Propostira ranii Bhattacharya, 1935 Comments: Endemic to India

LIII.m. Genus Rhomphaea L. Koch, 1872

1. Rhomphaea projiciens (O.P.-Cambridge, 1896) Distribution: USA to Argentina, India

LIII.n. Genus Steatoda Sundevall, 1833

1. Steatoda alboclathrata (Simon, 1897) Comments: Endemic to India
2. Steatoda albomaculata (De Geer, 1778) Distribution: Cosmopolitan
3. Steatoda rufoannulata (Simon, 1899) Distribution: India, Sri Lanka, Sumatra, Java

LIII.o. Genus Theridion Walckenaer, 1805

1. Theridion incertum O.P.-Cambridge, 1885 Comments: Endemic to India
2. Theridion indicum Tikader, 1977 Comments: Endemic to Andaman & Nicobar Islands
3. Theridion leucophaeum Simon, 1905 Comments: Endemic to India
4. Theridion maindroni Simon, 1905 Comments: Endemic to India
5. Theridion manjithar Tikader, 1970 Comments: Endemic to India.
6. Theridion nilgherinum Simon, 1905 Comments: Endemic to India
7. Theridion piligerum Frauenfeld, 1867 Comments: Endemic to Andaman & Nicobar Islands
8. Theridion sadani Monga & Singh, 1989 Comments: Endemic to India
9. Theridion spinosissimum Caporiacco, 1934 Comments: Endemic to India.
10. Theridion subitum O.P.-Cambridge, 1885 Comments: Endemic to India
11. Theridion subvittatum Simon, 1889 Comments: Endemic to India
12. Theridion tikaderi Patel, 1973 Comments: Endemic to India

LIII.p. Genus Theridula Emerton, 1882

1. Theridula angula Tikader, 1970 Comments: Endemic to India
2. Theridula swatiae Biswas, Saha & Raychaudhuri, 1997 Comments: Endemic to India

LIII.q. Genus Thwaitesia O.P.-Cambridge, 1881

1. Thwaitesia dangensis Patel & Patel, 1972 Comments: Endemic to India

LIII.r. Genus Tomoxena Simon, 1895

1. Tomoxena dives Simon, 1895 Comments: Endemic to India

== LIV. Family Theridiosomatidae Simon, 1881 ==
LIV.a. Genus Wendilgarda Keyserling, 1886

1. Wendilgarda assamensis Fage, 1924 Distribution: India, China

== LV. Family Thomisidae Sundevall, 1833 ==
LV.a. Genus Amyciaea Simon, 1885

1. Amyciaea forticeps (O.P.-Cambridge, 1873) Distribution: India, China to Malaysia

LV.b. Genus Angaeus Thorell, 1881

1. Angaeus pentagonalis Pocock, 1901 Endemic to India.

LV.c. Genus Bomis L. Koch, 1874

1. Bomis bengalensis Tikader, 1962 Comments: Endemic to India
2. Bomis calcuttaensis Biswas & Mazumder, 1981 Comments: Endemic to India
3. Bomis khajuriai Tikader, 1980 Comments: Endemic to India

LV.d. Genus Borboropactus Simon, 1884

1. Borboropactus elephantus (Tikader, 1966) Comments: Endemic to India.

LV.e. Genus Camaricus Thorell, 1887

1. Camaricus bipunctatus Bastawade, 2002 Endemic to India. Genus misspelled in original description.
2. Camaricus formosus Thorell, 1887 Distribution: India to Sumatra, China, Philippines
3. Camaricus khandalaensis Tikader, 1980 Comments: Endemic to India
4. Camaricus maugei (Walckenaer, 1837) Distribution: India to Vietnam, Sumatra, Java, Krakatau

LV.f. Genus Demogenes Simon, 1895

1. Demogenes andamanensis (Tikader, 1980) Comments: Endemic to Andaman & Nicobar Islands.

LV.g. Genus Diaea Thorell, 1869

1. Diaea bengalensis Biswas & Majumder, 1981 Comments: Endemic to India
2. Diaea pougneti Simon, 1885 Comments: Endemic to India
3. Diaea subdola O.P.-Cambridge, 1885 Distribution: Russia, India, Pakistan to Japan

LV.h. Genus Dietopsa Strand, 1932 Comments: Endemic to India.

1. Dietopsa castaneifrons (Simon, 1895) Comments: Endemic to India
2. Dietopsa parnassia (Simon, 1895) Comments: Endemic to India.

LV.i. Genus Ebrechtella Dahl, 1907

1. Ebrechtella concinna (Thorell, 1877) Distribution: Pakistan, India to Philippines, Sulawesi, New Guinea

LV.j. Genus Epidius Thorell, 1877

1. Epidius longipalpis Thorell, 1877 Distribution: India, Sri Lanka, Java, Sumatra, Ceram, Sulawesi

LV.k. Genus Henriksenia Lehtinen, 2005

1. Henriksenia hilaris (Thorell, 1877) Distribution: India to Philippines, Sulawesi, New Guinea

LV.l. Genus Heriaeus Simon, 1875

1. Heriaeus horridus Tyschchenko, 1965 Distribution: India, Russia, Central Asia

LV.m. Genus Holopelus Simon, 1886

1. Holopelus malati Simon, 1895 Comments: Endemic to India

LV.n. Genus Loxobates Thorell, 1877

1. Loxobates castetsi (Simon, 1906) Comments: Endemic to India.
2. Loxobates kapuri (Tikader, 1980) Comments: Endemic to India.

LV.o. Genus Lycopus Thorell, 1895

1. Lycopus trabeatus Simon, 1895 Comments: Endemic to India

LV.p. Genus Lysiteles Simon, 1895

1. Lysiteles brunettii (Tikader, 1962) Comments: Endemic to India.
2. Lysiteles catulus Simon, 1895 Comments: Endemic to India
3. Lysiteles excultus (O.P.-Cambridge, 1885) Distribution: India, Pakistan Comments: Endemic to South Asia.
4. Lysiteles mandali (Tikader, 1966) Distribution: India, China

LV.q. Genus Massuria Thorell, 1887

1. Massuria roonwali (Basu, 1964) Comments: Endemic to India.
2. Massuria sreepanchamii (Tikader, 1962) Comments: Endemic to India.

LV.r. Genus Mastira Thorell, 1891

1. Mastira menoka (Tikader, 1963) Comments: Endemic to India.
2. Mastira nicobarensis (Tikader, 1980) Comments: Endemic to Andaman & Nicobar Islands.

LV.s. Genus Misumena Latreille, 1804

1. Misumena annapurna Tikader, 1963 Comments: Endemic to India
2. Misumena ganpatii Kumari & Mittal, 1994 Comments: Endemic to India
3. Misumena greenae Tikader, 1965 Comments: Endemic to India
4. Misumena indra Tikader, 1963 Comments: Endemic to India
5. Misumena mridulai Tikader, 1962 Comments: Endemic to India

LV.t. Genus Misumenoides F.O.P.-Cambridge, 1900

1. Misumenoides gwarighatensis Gajbe, 2004 Comments: Endemic to India

LV.u. Genus Misumenops F.O.P.-Cambridge, 1900

1. Misumenops khandalaensis Tikader, 1965 Comments: Endemic to India

LV.v. Genus Monaeses Thorell, 1869

1. Monaeses jabalpurensis Gajbe & Rane, 1992 Comments: Endemic to India
2. Monaeses mukundi Tikader, 1980 Comments: Endemic to India
3. Monaeses pachpediensis (Tikader, 1980) Comments: Endemic to India.
4. Monaeses parvati Tikader, 1963 Comments: Endemic to India

LV.w. Genus Oxytate L. Koch, 1878

1. Oxytate chlorion (Simon, 1906) Comments: Endemic to India
2. Oxytate elongata (Tikader, 1980) Comments: Endemic to India
3. Oxytate greenae (Tikader, 1980) Comments: Endemic to Andaman & Nicobar Islands
4. Oxytate virens (Thorell, 1891) Distribution: India, Vietnam, Singapore

LV.x. Genus Ozyptila Simon, 1864

1. Ozyptila amkhasensis Tikader, 1980 Comments: Endemic to India
2. Ozyptila chandosiensis Tikader, 1980 Comments: Endemic to India
3. Ozyptila jabalpurensis Bhandari & Gajbe, 2001 Comments: Endemic to India
4. Ozyptila khasi Tikader, 1961 Comments: Endemic to India
5. Ozyptila manii Tikader, 1961 Comments: Endemic to India
6. Ozyptila maratha Tikader, 1971 Comments: Endemic to India.
7. Ozyptila reenae Basu, 1964 Comments: Endemic to India
8. Ozyptila theobaldi Simon, 1885 Comments: Endemic to India

LV.y. Genus Pasias Simon, 1895

1. Pasias marathas Tikader, 1965 Comments: Endemic to India
2. Pasias puspagiri Tikader, 1963 Comments: Endemic to India

LV.z. Genus Phrynarachne Thorell, 1869

1. Phrynarachne peeliana (Stoliczka, 1869) Comments: Endemic to India
2. Phrynarachne tuberosa (Blackwall, 1864) Comments: Endemic to India

LV.aa. Genus Pistius Simon, 1875

1. Pistius barchensis Basu, 1965 Comments: Endemic to India
2. Pistius bhadurii Basu, 1965 Comments: Endemic to India
3. Pistius gangulyi Basu, 1965 Distribution: India, China
4. Pistius kalimpus Tikader, 1970 Comments: Endemic to India
5. Pistius kanikae Basu, 1964 Comments: Endemic to India
6. Pistius robustus Basu, 1965 Endemic to India
7. Pistius tikaderi Kumari & Mittal, 1999 Comments: Endemic to India

LV.ab. Genus Platythomisus Doleschall, 1859

1. Platythomisus bazarus Tikader, 1970 Comments: Endemic to India
2. Platythomisus sudeepi Biswas, 1977 Comments: Endemic to India

LV.ac. Genus Runcinia Simon, 1875

1. Runcinia affinis Simon, 1897 Distribution: Africa, India to Japan, Philippines, Java
2. Runcinia bifrons (Simon, 1895) Distribution: India, Sri Lanka, Vietnam
3. Runcinia chauhani Sen & Basu, 1972 Comments: Endemic to India
4. Runcinia escheri Reimoser, 1934 Comments: Endemic to India
5. Runcinia ghorpadei Tikader, 1980 Comments: Endemic to India
6. Runcinia khandari Gajbe, 2004 Comments: Endemic to India
7. Runcinia kinbergi Thorell, 1891 Distribution: India, Myanmar, Java
8. Runcinia roonwali Tikader, 1965 Comments: Endemic to India
9. Runcinia sitadongri Gajbe, 2004 Comments: Endemic to India
10. Runcinia spinulosa (O.P.-Cambridge, 1885) Distribution: Pakistan, India Comments: Endemic to South Asia.
11. Runcinia yogeshi Gajbe & Gajbe, 2001 Comments: Endemic to India
12. Runcinia sitadongri Gajbe, 2004 Comments: Endemic to India

LV.ad. Genus Stiphropus Gerstäcker, 1873

1. Stiphropus duriusculus (Simon, 1885) Comments: Endemic to India
2. Stiphropus soureni Sen, 1964 Distribution: India, Nepal, Bhutan Comments: Endemic to South Asia

LV.ae. Genus Strigoplus Simon, 1885

1. Strigoplus bilobus Saha & Raychaudhuri, 2004 Comments: Endemic to India
2. Strigoplus moluri Patel, 2003 Comments: Endemic to India
3. Strigoplus netravati Tikader, 1963 Comments: Endemic to India

LV.af. Genus Synema Simon, 1864

1. Synema decoratum Tikader, 1960 Distribution: India, China
2. Synema mysorense Tikader, 1980 Comments: Endemic to India

LV.ag. Genus Talaus Simon, 1886

1. Talaus opportunus (O.P.-Cambridge, 1873) Comments: Endemic to India

LV.ah. Genus Tharpyna L. Koch, 1874

1. Tharpyna himachalensis Tikader & Biswas, 1979 Comments: Endemic to India
2. Tharpyna indica Tikader & Biswas, 1979 Comments: Endemic to India

LV.ai. Genus Thomisus Walckenaer, 1805

1. Thomisus andamanensis Tikader, 1980 Comments: Endemic to Andaman & Nicobar Islands
2. Thomisus armillatus (Thorell, 1891) Comments: Endemic to Andaman & Nicobar Islands
3. Thomisus baghdeoi Gajbe, 2004 Comments: Endemic to India
4. Thomisus beautifularis Basu, 1965 Comments: Endemic to India
5. Thomisus baghdeoi Gajbe, 2004 Comments: Endemic to India
6. Thomisus bargi Gajbe, 2004 Comments: Endemic to India
7. Thomisus bulani Tikader, 1960 Comments: Endemic to India
8. Thomisus danieli Gajbe, 2004 Comments: Endemic to India
9. Thomisus daradioides Simon, 1890 Distribution: South Africa to India
10. Thomisus dhakuriensis Tikader, 1960 Comments: Endemic to India
11. Thomisus dyali Kumari & Mittal, 1997 Comments: Endemic to India
12. Thomisus elongatus Stoliczka, 1869 Endemic to India.
13. Thomisus godavariae Reddy & Patel, 1992 Comments: Endemic to India
14. Thomisus granulifrons Simon, 1906 Distribution: India, Sri Lanka Comments: Endemic to South Asia
15. Thomisus katrajghatus Tikader, 1963 Comments: Endemic to India
16. Thomisus kokiwadai Gajbe, 2004 Comments: Endemic to India
17. Thomisus krishnae Reddy & Patel, 1992 Comments: Endemic to India
18. Thomisus leucaspis Simon, 1906 Distribution: India, New Caledonia
19. Thomisus lobosus Tikader, 1965 Comments: Endemic to India
20. Thomisus ludhianaensis Kumari & Mittal, 1997 Comments: Endemic to India
21. Thomisus mimae Sen & Basu, 1963 Comments: Endemic to India
22. Thomisus pateli Gajbe, 2004 Comments: Endemic to India
23. Thomisus pathaki Gajbe, 2004 Comments: Endemic to India
24. Thomisus pooneus Tikader, 1965 Comments: Endemic to India
25. Thomisus projectus Tikader, 1960 Comments: Endemic to India
26. Thomisus pugilis Stoliczka, 1869 Comments: Endemic to India
27. Thomisus rajani Bhandari & Gajbe, 2001 Comments: Endemic to India
28. Thomisus rigoratus Simon, 1906 Comments: Endemic to India
29. Thomisus rishus Tikader, 1970 Comments: Endemic to India
30. Thomisus shillongensis Sen, 1963 Comments: Endemic to India
31. Thomisus shivajiensis Tikader, 1965 Comments: Endemic to India
32. Thomisus sikkimensis Tikader, 1962 Comments: Endemic to India
33. Thomisus simoni Gajbe, 2004 Comments: Endemic to India
34. Thomisus sorajaii Basu, 1963 Comments: Endemic to India
35. Thomisus spectabilis Doleschall, 1859 Distribution: India to Australia
36. Thomisus sundari Gajbe & Gajbe, 2001 Comments: Endemic to India
37. Thomisus viveki Gajbe, 2004 Comments: Endemic to India
38. Thomisus whitakeri Gajbe, 2004 Comments: Endemic to India

LIV.aj. Genus Tmarus Simon, 1875

1. Tmarus dejectus (O.P.-Cambridge, 1885) Endemic to India
2. Tmarus fasciolatus Simon, 1906 Comments: Endemic to India
3. Tmarus jabalpurensis Gajbe & Gajbe, 1999 Comments: Endemic to India
4. Tmarus kotigeharus Tikader, 1963 Comments: Endemic to India
5. Tmarus soricinus Simon, 1906 Comments: Endemic to India

LV.ak. Genus Xysticus C.L. Koch, 1835

1. Xysticus bengalensis Tikader & Biswas, 1974 Comments: Endemic to India
2. Xysticus bharatae Gajbe & Gajbe, 1999 Comments: Endemic to India
3. Xysticus breviceps O.P.-Cambridge, 1885 Comments: Endemic to India
4. Xysticus croceus Fox, 1937 Distribution: India, Nepal, Bhutan, China, Korea, Japan
5. Xysticus himalayaensis Tikader & Biswas, 1974 Comments: Endemic to India
6. Xysticus hindusthanicus Basu, 1965 Comments: Endemic to India
7. Xysticus jabalpurensis Gajbe & Gajbe, 1999 Comments: Endemic to India
8. Xysticus jaharai Basu, 1979 Comments: Endemic to India
9. Xysticus joyantius Tikader, 1966 Comments: Endemic to India
10. Xysticus kali Tikader & Biswas, 1974 Comments: Endemic to India
11. Xysticus kamakhyai Tikader, 1962 Comments: Endemic to India
12. Xysticus kashidi Tikader, 1963 Comments: Endemic to India
13. Xysticus khasiensis Tikader, 1980 Comments: Endemic to India
14. Xysticus minutus Tikader, 1960 Comments: Endemic to India
15. Xysticus pynurus Tikader, 1968 Comments: Endemic to India
16. Xysticus roonwali Tikader, 1964 Distribution: India, Nepal Comments: Endemic to South Asia
17. Xysticus setiger O.P.-Cambridge, 1885 Distribution: India, Pakistan Comments: Endemic to South Asia
18. Xysticus shillongensis Tikader, 1962 Comments: Endemic to India
19. Xysticus shyamrupus Tikader, 1966 Comments: Endemic to India
20. Xysticus sikkimus Tikader, 1970 Distribution: India, China
21. Xysticus tikaderi Bhandari & Gajbe, 2001 Comments: Endemic to India

== LVI. Family Titanoecidae Lehtinen, 1967 ==
LVI.a. Genus Anuvinda Lehtinen, 1967 Comments: Monotypic Genus and endemic to India.

1. Anuvinda escheri (Reimoser, 1934) Endemic to India.

== LVII. Family Trochanteriidae Karsch, 1879 ==
LVII.a. Genus Plator Simon, 1880

1. Plator himalayaensis Tikader & Gajbe, 1976 Comments: Endemic to India
2. Plator indicus Simon, 1897 Synonym: Plator ixodinus Pocock, 1899 Endemic to India.
3. Plator kashmirensis Tikader & Gajbe, 1973 Comments: Endemic to India
4. Plator pandeae Tikader, 1969 Distribution: India, China
5. Plator solanensis Tikader & Gajbe, 1976 Comments: Endemic to India

== LVIII. Family Uloboridae Thorell, 1869 ==
LVIII.a. Genus Hyptiotes Walckenaer, 1837

1. Hyptiotes himalayensis Tikader, 1981 Comments: Endemic to India.
2. Hyptiotes indicus Simon, 1905 Comments: Endemic to India

LVIII.b. Genus Miagrammopes O. P.-Cambridge, 1870

1. Miagrammopes albomaculatus Thorell, 1891 Comments: Endemic to Andaman & Nicobar Islands
2. Miagrammopes extensus Simon, 1889 Synonym: Miagrammopes extensa Simon, 1889 Endemic to India
3. Miagrammopes gravelyi Tikader, 1971 Comments: Endemic to India
4. Miagrammopes indicus Tikader, 1971 Synonym: Miagrammopes indica Tikader, 1971 Endemic to India.
5. Miagrammopes kirkeensis Tikader, 1971 Comments: Endemic to India
6. Miagrammopes poonaensis Tikader, 1971 Comments: Endemic to India
7. Miagrammopes sexpunctatus Simon, 1906 Comments: Endemic to India
8. Miagrammopes sutherlandi Tikader, 1971 Comments: Endemic to India
9. Miagrammopes thwaitesi O.P.-Cambridge, 1870 Distribution: India, Sri Lanka Endemic to South Asia

LVIII.c. Genus Philoponella Mello-Leitão, 1917

1. Philoponella hilaris (Simon, 1906) Comments: Endemic to India.

LVIII.d. Genus Uloborus Latreille, 1806

1. Uloborus bigibbosus Simon, 1905 Comments: Endemic to India
2. Uloborus danolius Tikader, 1969 Comments: Endemic to India
3. Uloborus ferokus Bradoo, 1979 Comments: Endemic to India
4. Uloborus filifaciens Hingston, 1927 Comments: Endemic to Andaman & Nicobar Islands
5. Uloborus furunculus Simon, 1906 Comments: Endemic to India
6. Uloborus jabalpurensis Bhandari & Gajbe, 2001 Comments: Endemic to India
7. Uloborus khasiensis Tikader, 1969 Comments: Endemic to India
8. Uloborus krishnae Tikader, 1970 Comments: Endemic to India
9. Uloborus modestus Thorell, 1891 Comments: Endemic to Andaman & Nicobar Islands

LVIII.e. Genus Zosis Walckenaer, 1842

1. Zosis geniculata (Olivier, 1789) Distribution: Pantropical

== LIX. Family Zodariidae Thorell, 1881 ==
LIX.a. Genus Asceua Thorell, 1887

1. Asceua cingulata (Simon, 1905) Synonym: Suffucia cingulata Simon, 1905 Comments: Endemic to India

LIX.b. Genus Capheris Simon, 1893

1. Capheris escheri Reimoser, 1934 Comments: Endemic to India
2. Capheris nitidiceps Simon, 1905 Comments: Endemic to India
3. Capheris stillata Simon, 1905 Comments: Endemic to India

LIX.c. Genus Hermippus Simon, 1893

1. Hermippus arjuna (Gravely, 1921) Synonym: Hermippoides arjuna Gravely, 1921 Comments: Endemic to India
2. Hermippus cruciatus Simon, 1905 Distribution: India, Sri Lanka Comments: Endemic to South Asia

LIX.d. Genus Lutica Marx, 1891 Comments: According to Platnick all Indian species are misplaced.

1. Lutica bengalensis Tikader & Patel, 1975 Comments: Endemic to India
2. Lutica deccanensis Tikader & Malhotra, 1976 Comments: Endemic to India
3. Lutica kovvurensis Reddy & Patel, 1993 Comments: Endemic to India
4. Lutica poonaensis Tikader, 1981 Comments: Endemic to India

LIX.e. Genus Storena Walckenaer, 1805

1. Storena arakuensis Patel & Reddy, 1989 Comments: Endemic to India
2. Storena birenifer Gravely, 1921 Comments: Endemic to India
3. Storena debasrae Biswas & Biswas, 1992 Comments: Endemic to India
4. Storena gujaratensis Tikader & Patel, 1975 Comments: Endemic to India
5. Storena indica Tikader & Patel, 1975 Comments: Endemic to India
6. Storena nilgherina Simon, 1906 Comments: Endemic to India
7. Storena redimita Simon, 1905 Comments: Endemic to India
8. Storena tikaderi Patel & Reddy, 1989 Comments: Endemic to India

LIX.f. Genus Storenomorpha Simon, 1884

1. Storenomorpha joyaus (Tikader, 1970) Comments: Endemic to India.

LIX.g. Genus Suffasia Jocqué, 1991 Comments: Endemic to South Asia.

1. Suffasia tigrina (Simon, 1893) Comments: Endemic to India.
