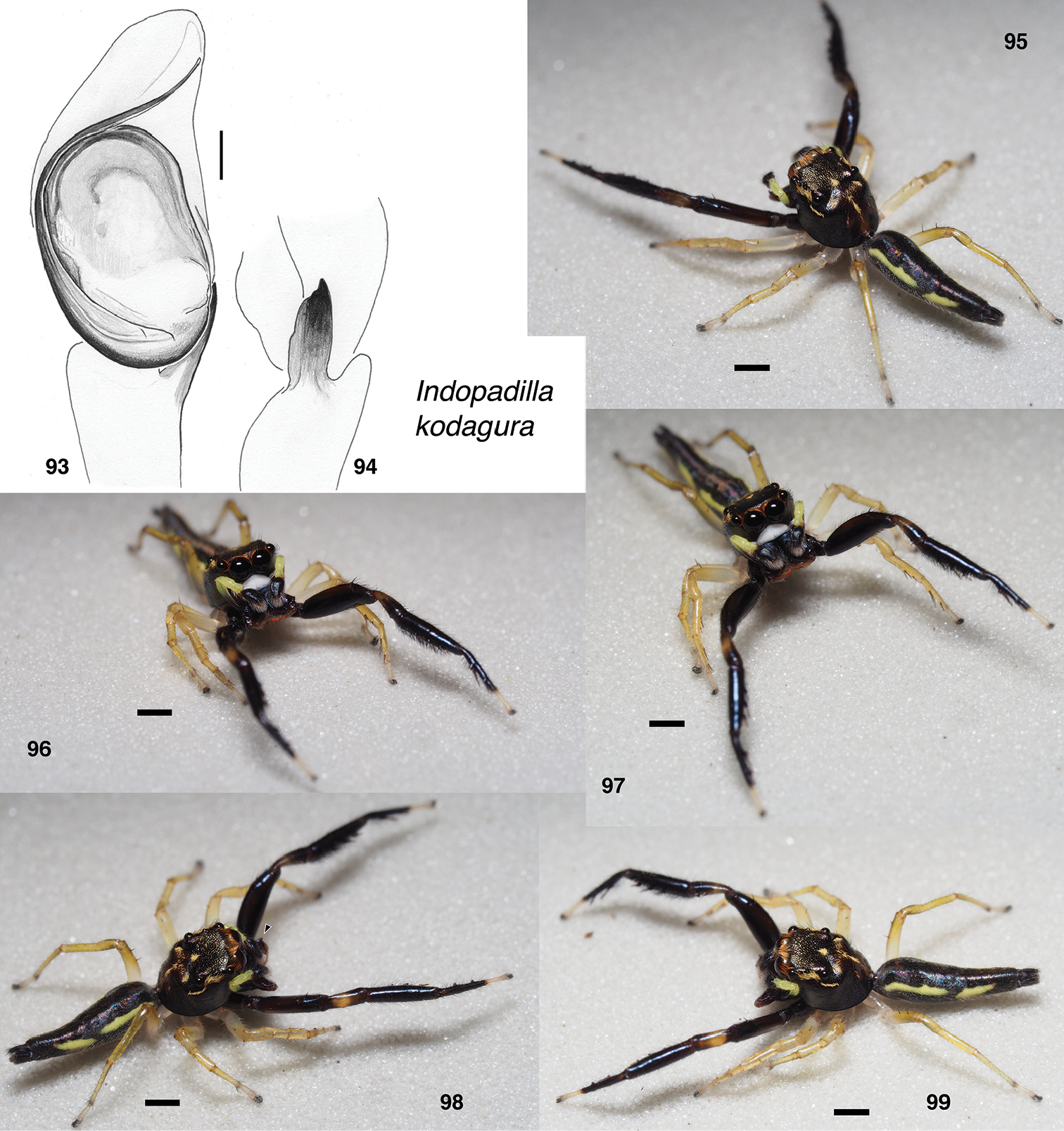

Scientific classification
- Kingdom: Animalia
- Phylum: Arthropoda
- Subphylum: Chelicerata
- Class: Arachnida
- Order: Araneae
- Infraorder: Araneomorphae
- Family: Salticidae
- Subfamily: Salticinae
- Genus: Indopadilla; Caleb & Sankaran, 2019

Type species
- I. darjeeling Caleb & Sankaran, 2019

Species
- 14, see text

= Indopadilla =

Genus of jumping spiders

Indopadilla is a genus of jumping spiders first described by J. T. D. Caleb, P. M. Sankaran and K. S. Nafin in 2019. It was placed into the tribe Baviini in the Salticoida clade of Salticinae. Several species have been transferred from the genus Bavia.

== Species ==
As of March 2022 it contains fourteen species:

- I. annamita (Simon, 1903) – China, Vietnam
- I. bamilin Maddison, 2020 – Malaysia (Borneo)
- I. darjeeling Caleb & Sankaran, 2019 (type) – India
- I. insularis (Malamel, Sankaran & Sebastian, 2015) – India
- I. kahariana (Prószyński & Deeleman-Reinhold, 2013) – Indonesia (Borneo)
- I. kodagura Maddison, 2020 – India
- I. nesinor Maddison, 2020 – Singapore
- I. redunca Maddison, 2020 – Malaysia (Borneo)
- I. redynis Maddison, 2020 – Malaysia (Borneo)
- I. sabivia Maddison, 2020 – Malaysia (Borneo)
- I. sonsorol (Berry, Beatty & Prószyński, 1997) – Caroline Is.
- I. suhartoi (Prószyński & Deeleman-Reinhold, 2013) – Indonesia (Borneo)
- I. thorelli (Simon, 1901) – Indonesia (Sulawesi)
- I. vimedaba Maddison, 2020 – Singapore, Malaysia (Borneo)

== See also ==
- Bavia
- Stagetillus
- Padillothorax
- List of Salticidae genera
