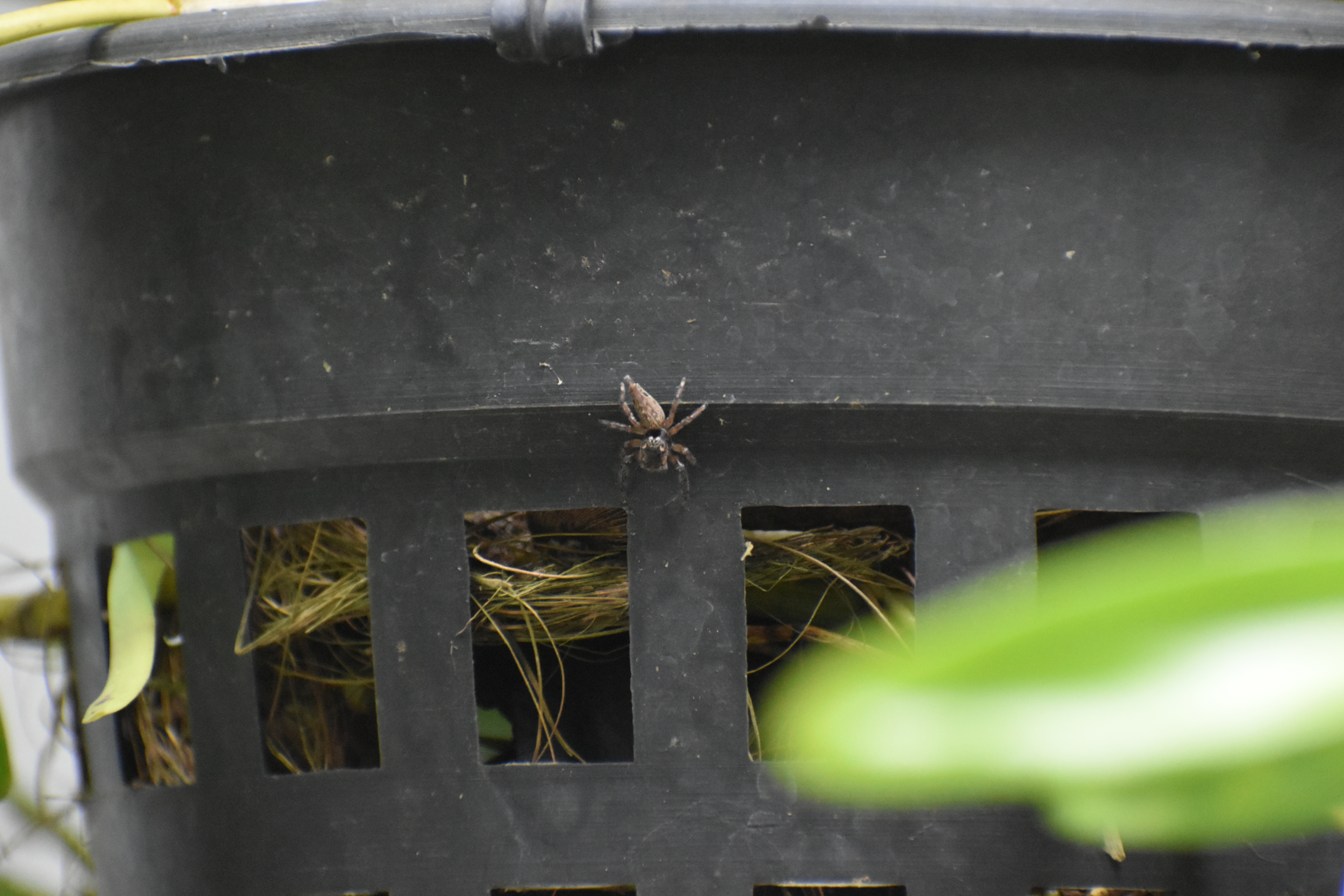

Scientific classification
- Kingdom: Animalia
- Phylum: Arthropoda
- Subphylum: Chelicerata
- Class: Arachnida
- Order: Araneae
- Infraorder: Araneomorphae
- Family: Salticidae
- Genus: Maripanthus; Maddison, 2020

Type species
- M. draconis Maddison, 2020

Species
- 6, see text

= Maripanthus =

Genus of jumping spiders

Maripanthus is a genus of Asian jumping spiders first described by Wayne Maddison, I. Beattie and K. Marathe in 2020.

== Species ==
As of March 2022 it contains six species:

- M. draconis Maddison, 2020 (type) – Singapore
- M. gloria Caleb, 2021 – India
- M. jubatus Maddison, 2020 – India
- M. menghaiensis (Cao & Li, 2016) – China
- M. reinholdae Maddison, 2020 – Borneo (Malaysia, Brunei)
- M. smedleyi (Reimoser, 1929) – Indonesia (Sumatra)

== See also ==
- Bavia
- Nannenus
- List of Salticidae genera
