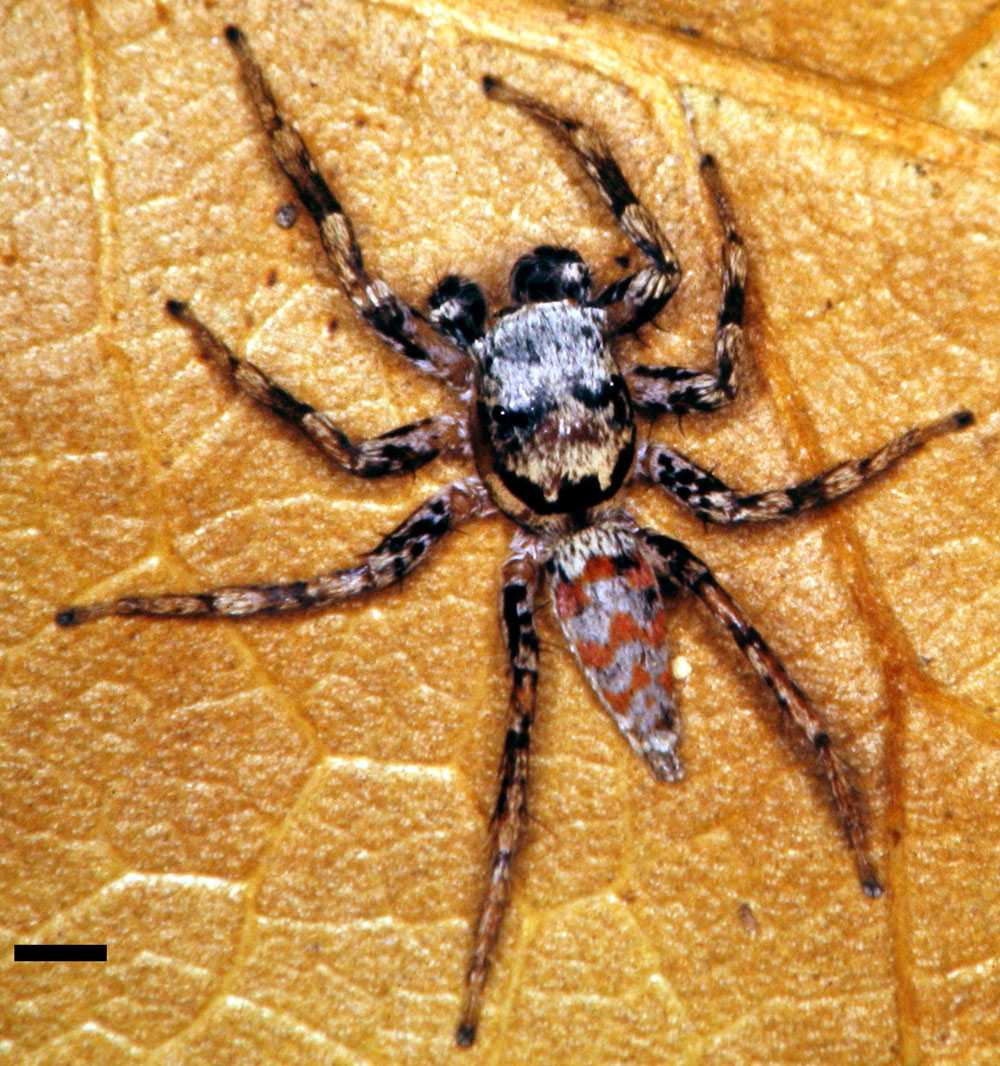
- Paramaevia michelsoni

Scientific classification
- Kingdom: Animalia
- Phylum: Arthropoda
- Subphylum: Chelicerata
- Class: Arachnida
- Order: Araneae
- Infraorder: Araneomorphae
- Family: Salticidae
- Subfamily: Salticinae
- Genus: Paramaevia; Barnes, 1955

= Paramaevia =

Genus of spiders

Paramaevia is a genus of jumping spiders in the family Salticidae. There are at least three described species in Paramaevia.

== Taxonomy ==
The group was first described as a subgenus of Maevia in 1955, and elevated to a genus in 1958. In 1977, it was reduced to a junior synonym of Maevia. This was rejected by Jerzy Prószyński in 2017. When included in Maevia, it was placed in the tribe Dendryphantini, part of the Salticoida clade of the subfamily Salticinae.

=== Species ===
These three species belong to the genus Paramaevia:

- Paramaevia hobbsae (Barnes, 1955)^{s}
- Paramaevia michelsoni Barnes, 1955^{b s}
- Paramaevia poultoni Peckham & Peckham, 1901^{b s}

Data sources: i = ITIS, c = Catalogue of Life, g = GBIF, s = World Spider Catalog, b = Bugguide.net
