= Bavia capistrata =

- Male

Scientific classification
- Kingdom: Animalia
- Phylum: Arthropoda
- Subphylum: Chelicerata
- Class: Arachnida
- Order: Araneae
- Infraorder: Araneomorphae
- Family: Salticidae
- Genus: Bavia
- Species: B. capistrata

Binomial name
- Bavia capistrata (C. L. Koch, 1846)

Synonyms
- Maevia capistrata C. L. Koch, 1846

Species of spider

Bavia capistrata is a species of jumping spider in the genus Bavia. The species was originally described by Carl Ludwig Koch as Maevia capistrata in 1846.

The specific name capistrata derives from Latin capistratus, meaning "with a harness", referring to distinctive markings on the male.

== Taxonomy ==
The species was originally placed in the genus Maevia by Koch in 1846. It was later transferred to Bavia by Żabka in 1988, who also removed it from synonymy with Evarcha flavocincta.

== Distribution ==
B. capistrata is distributed across Malaysia, China, and extending to Australia and Pacific Islands. The species has been recorded from Yunnan province in southwestern China.

== Description ==
Bavia capistrata shows marked sexual dimorphism, with females being notably larger than males.

=== Female ===
Females have a total length of approximately 8.7 mm, with the cephalothorax measuring 3.44 mm in length. The carapace is reddish-brown, appearing lighter on the dorsal surface, while the ocular area is dark brown and covered with white setae. The chelicerae are dark brown, and the maxillae are elongate with white tips. The abdomen is elongated and features a light broad median stripe with grey margins.

The first pair of legs is more robust and darker than the others. The epigyne is strongly sclerotized along the posterior midline margin, with slit-shaped copulatory openings that have strongly sclerotized edges.

=== Male ===
Males have a cephalothorax measuring approximately 2.75 mm in length, which is much flattened and elongate. The surroundings of the eyes are black-brown, otherwise brown, with a fringe of white setae around the eye field and similar setae forming small tufts on the thorax, along with sparse grey-yellow and grey-brown bristles.

The opisthosoma is very slender, measuring 4.12 mm in length, with a dark grey background featuring two orange transverse median streaks and patches of similar colour in the anterior part and near the orange spinnerets. The clypeus is very narrow and grey-brown. The chelicerae are brown with numerous white hairs, while the maxillae, labium and sternum are grey-brown. The venter displays a black-grey longitudinal median belt on an orange background.

The first pair of legs is brown, longer and thicker than the others, covered with grey-brown and grey protruding hairs and tufts of white setae, with rather short brown spines. The other legs are orange with similar protruding hairs and light brown spines.
