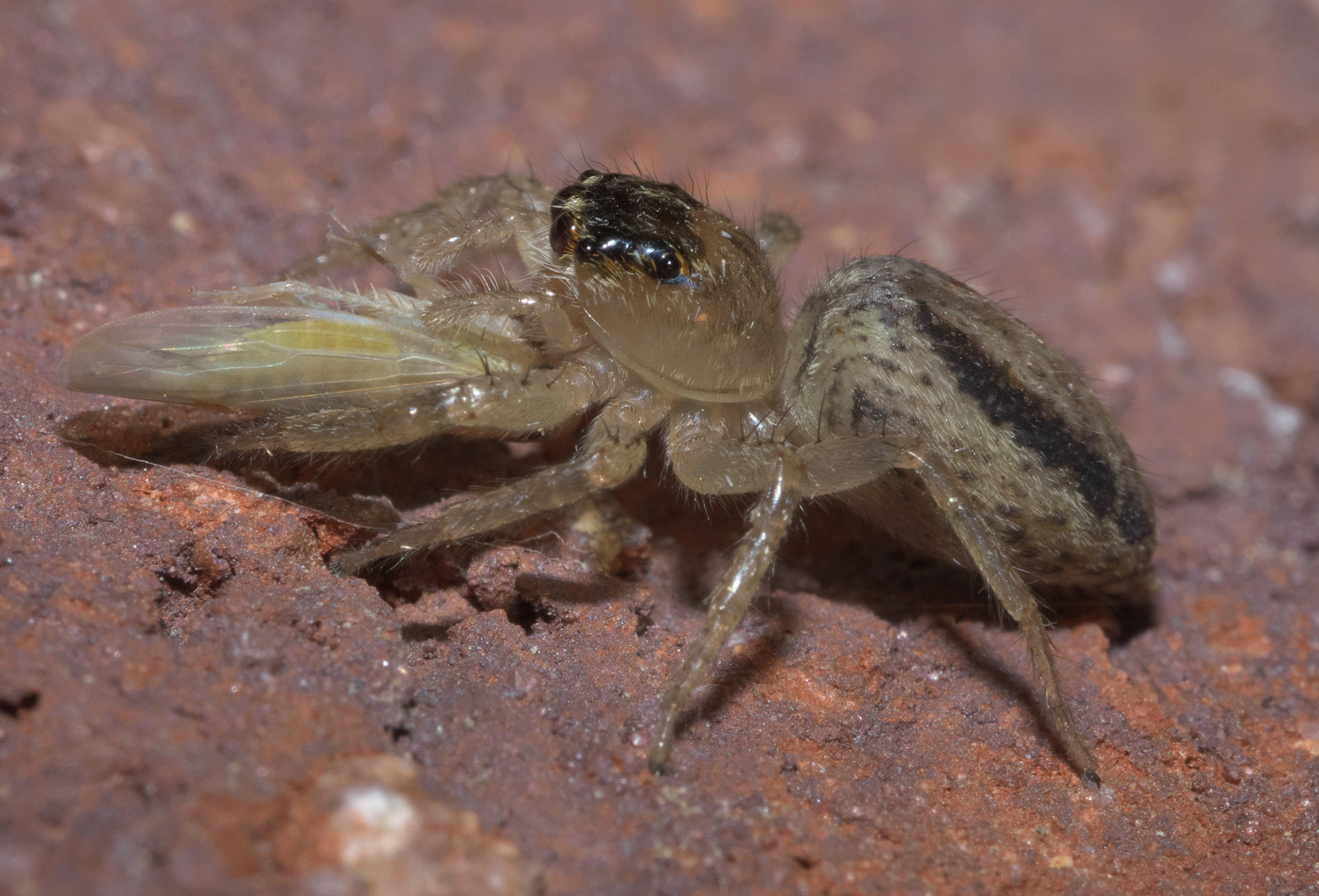
- Model look of Maevia genus: M. inclemens

Scientific classification
- Kingdom: Animalia
- Phylum: Arthropoda
- Subphylum: Chelicerata
- Class: Arachnida
- Order: Araneae
- Infraorder: Araneomorphae
- Family: Salticidae
- Genus: Maevia
- Species: M. intermedia

Binomial name
- Maevia intermedia Barnes, 1955

= Maevia intermedia =

Species of spider

Maevia intermedia is one of eight species of Salticidae, or jumping spider, in the genus Maevia, and is native to North America. This species was originally reported by American Zoologist Robert D. Barnes in 1955 as a needed distinguishment between the similar-looking Maevia species, especially those found in the Americas.

Maevia intermedia are extremely similar in morphology and overall ecology to their taxonomical order's more studied model species Maevia inclemens. M. inclemens is a dimorphic spider that possesses two color morphs in males of its species. The males and females of M. intermedia are fairly identical to their more studied counterparts with the male sex looking most similar to the light morph of M. Clemens. Maevia intermedia are medium-sized jumping spiders with females being slightly larger than the males.

Like all other jumping spiders, M. intermedia possesses eyes of differing sizes in anterior, lateral, and posterior positions. The nature of the eye formation and composition has given rise to some of the most elaborate vision-dependent hunting strategies observed in the animal kingdom

Maevia intermedia observations have been documented in various locations in the southern United States such as Georgia and Alabama. This species can be found in forests and similar to Maevia inclemens, can inhabit man-made structures.

== Physiology ==
Maevia intermedia are members of the subphyla Chelicerata is known for their physiological differences that are a major distinction from other arthropods. Arthropod bodies are made up of three segments called Tagmata and in the case of chelicerates, they only possess two. In chelicerates, these tagmata are called the Prosoma and the Opisthosoma. The prosoma is the anterior segment that contains eight walking legs and the feeding appendages of spiders called "chelicerae" which can stab at prey, injecting them with venom. This segment also contains pedipalps which are sensory arms used in male spiders for inseminating females with sperm. and mating rituals via signaling Their bodies are also lightly covered in small hairs and spines along their carapace.

This species can be described in most respects as an intermediate form between its two closest relatives Maevia inclemens and Maevia expansa. The males are identical in color and morphology, to the lighter morph of Maevia inclemens though most species in the genus behave like the gray morph. Females of the species are identical to females of M. inclemens and contain a v-shaped epigynum. From a sampling of holotypes of the species, females tended to be slightly larger with the species being around 5–6.5 millimeters in length.

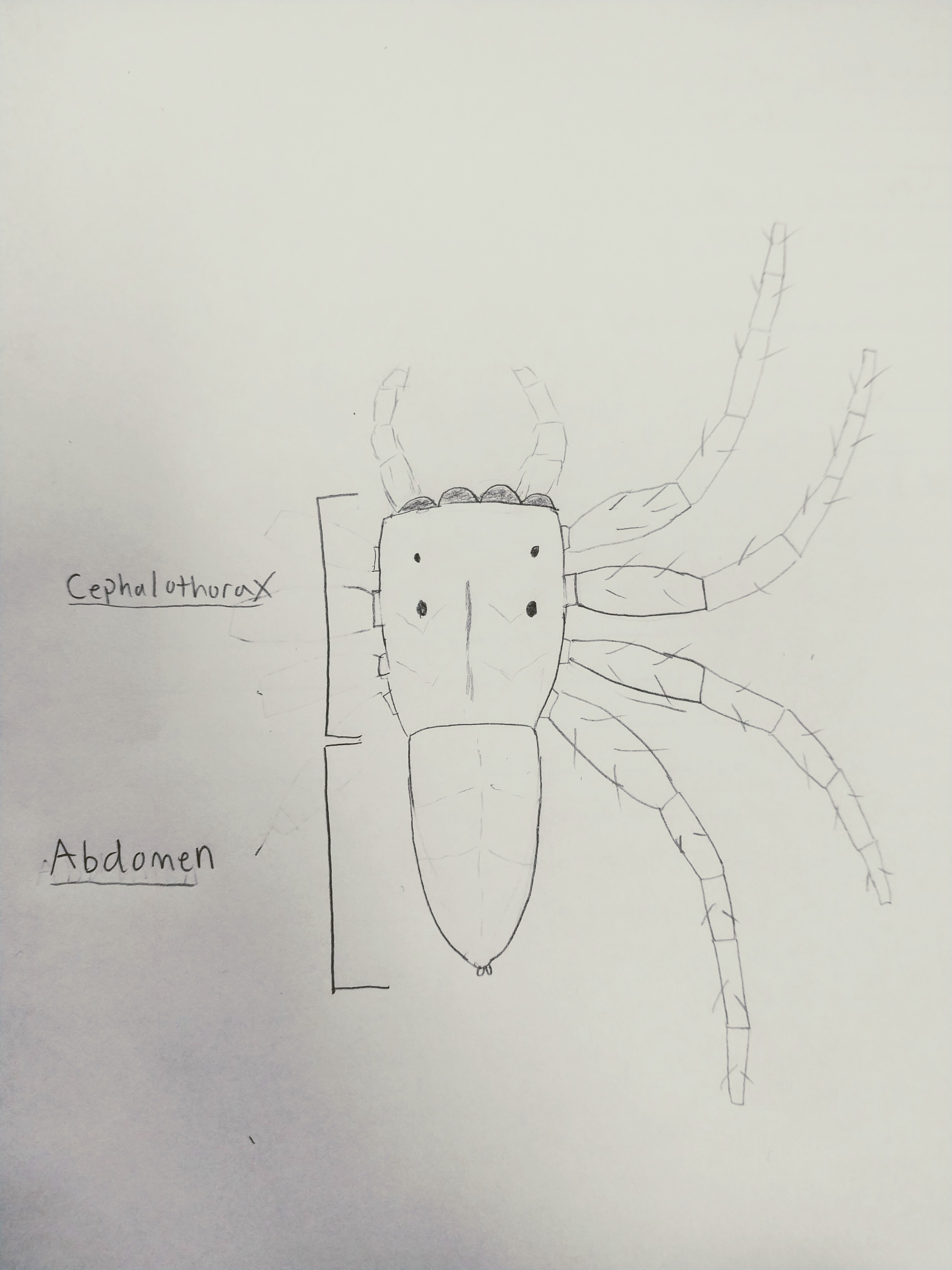
Illustration of Tagmata

M. intermedia is of the family Salticidae which are characterized by their "principal eyes" which are forward-facing visual systems that allow for great spatial acuity in vision. Their eyes are similar to a telescope and have complex layering that has given Salticids higher spatial acuity than other spiders. This visual system gives them a visual advantage when hunting.

== Reproduction and ecology ==
Most species in the genus Maevia follow the mating behavior of the gray morph of the M inclemens species. This courtship behavior pattern is standard for all jumping spiders which involves three phases In the first phase, males will utilize a mating display to attract a female's attention for the latter to identify if the male is of her species. This can be potentially dangerous as it gives males a conspicuousness that can attract predators, further exacerbated by the patterning and light coloration of M. intermedia. Gray M. inclement males tend to utilize a more prone display and given that most species in this genus follow this morph's behavior, it can be expected for M. intermedia to follow this mating pattern. As seen with the M. inclement gray morph, the male will display around 3 cm from the female by moving closer to a surface and sliding in an oscillatory motion while prone. The next phase entails female recognition and a showing of receptivity whether that be laying motionless or a more likely approaching of the male as seen in M. inclemens. In the last phase, a male will mount the female and copulation will occur. Once finished, the male will dismount and they will decouple.

Male spiders tend to face potential risk when mating not just from external predators but from the cannibalistic female they attempt to court. During a display, a female may attempt predation on a displaying male. This has possibly caused the evolution of two different color morphs in the sister species M. inclemens as color affects reproduction success at certain distances. Sexual cannibalism by females is common in jumping spiders not just before mating but also after. This aggression is observed in many spiders and is a function of mating-induced sexual inhibition. This behavior occurs after a mating when a female becomes unreceptive and aggressive to males. This is a concept that is heavily studied in bugs but more work is needed in spider models.

The main difference between M. intermedia and the closely related species M. inclemens is the reproductive structures. The palps of males are larger in this species with cymbium rotated in a fashion that makes it as wide as it is long. In females, the opening of their epigynum is a pit shaped like a V.

This species is of the family Salticidae and as such undergoes the general lifecycle of the family group. Females use silk to mask fertilized eggs in a cocoon and a period of incubation occurs in which the egg membrane is shed over 24-26 days. The first instar form will develop during this time with the first ecdysis occurring at a similar period to which the egg membrane is shed. A few days after this, the juvenile spiders will leave the built-in covering and leave.

A series of molts occurs in which juveniles will progress to adulthood. In the sister species of M. inclemens, the gray morph and lighter morph that M. intermedia takes after are not distinguishable until the final molt.

== Hunting practice ==
Hunting behavior in the spider family Salticidae is a process facilitated by their complex visual system. Most observed spiders of this class will recognize prey from a certain distance away, stalk them, and pounce on them. This diversion from web building may be a function of their enhanced spatial acuity from their eyesight. These spiders mainly prey on insects.

The basic hunting behavior for Salticid spiders goes in three phases: Orientation, Pursuit, and Capture. In the orientation phase, they will become aware that a prey is near. They will then swivel their body in that direction due to the eye formation on their cephalothorax. Finally, they will align in that direction. In phase two, they will then stalk the prey whether it be running or walking. In the final phase, do a pre-crouch, then actually crouch. In the last step, the spider will then launch itself at the prey with fangs out in a fluid motion. There will be slight modifications to this general formula of prey capture depending on whether the prey is stationary, in motion, the distance of the jump, and several other factors.

Salticidae spiders do not have hinge joints and the torque required for their jump is generated almost entirely by the straightening of their fourth pair of legs. This is due to haemocoelic fluid pressure change in the legs.

== Evolution ==
Maevia intermedia are of the phylum Arthropoda, which contain more described species than all of the kingdom all other organisms on earth. The organisms are categorized as having three body segments known as tagmata and a cuticle layer. This species belongs to a subphylum of arthropods known as chelicerates. Chelicerates have two body segments rather than three and contain chelicerae as a distinctive marker of this subphyla. Chelicerates are divided into two Orders, Araneae which are spiders, and Acari. Within this order of Araneae, there are thousands of living species. Living Chelicerates are further categorized between terrestrial arachnids and marine in Xiphosura. Aranae is an order in the Arachnida in which the family Salticidae resides. Salticidae are jumping spiders and the Maevia genus is what this species M. intermedia belongs to. Though the taxonomic outlook of Salticidae is understood, no fossil descriptions of the genus Maevia are currently known. The evolutionary history of the genus Maevia remains a mystery.

== Development ==
Maevia intermedia are protostomes that undergo molting as a function of being a part of the species Arthropoda which are Ecdysozoans, a clade characterized by being molting protostomes. In the embryo, a protostome forms the mouth first; then the anus opening forms and they maintain a spiral cleavage. These individuals are schizogenic and are determinate developers.

This organism is a direct developer as it progresses through different instar stages via molting until maturity.
