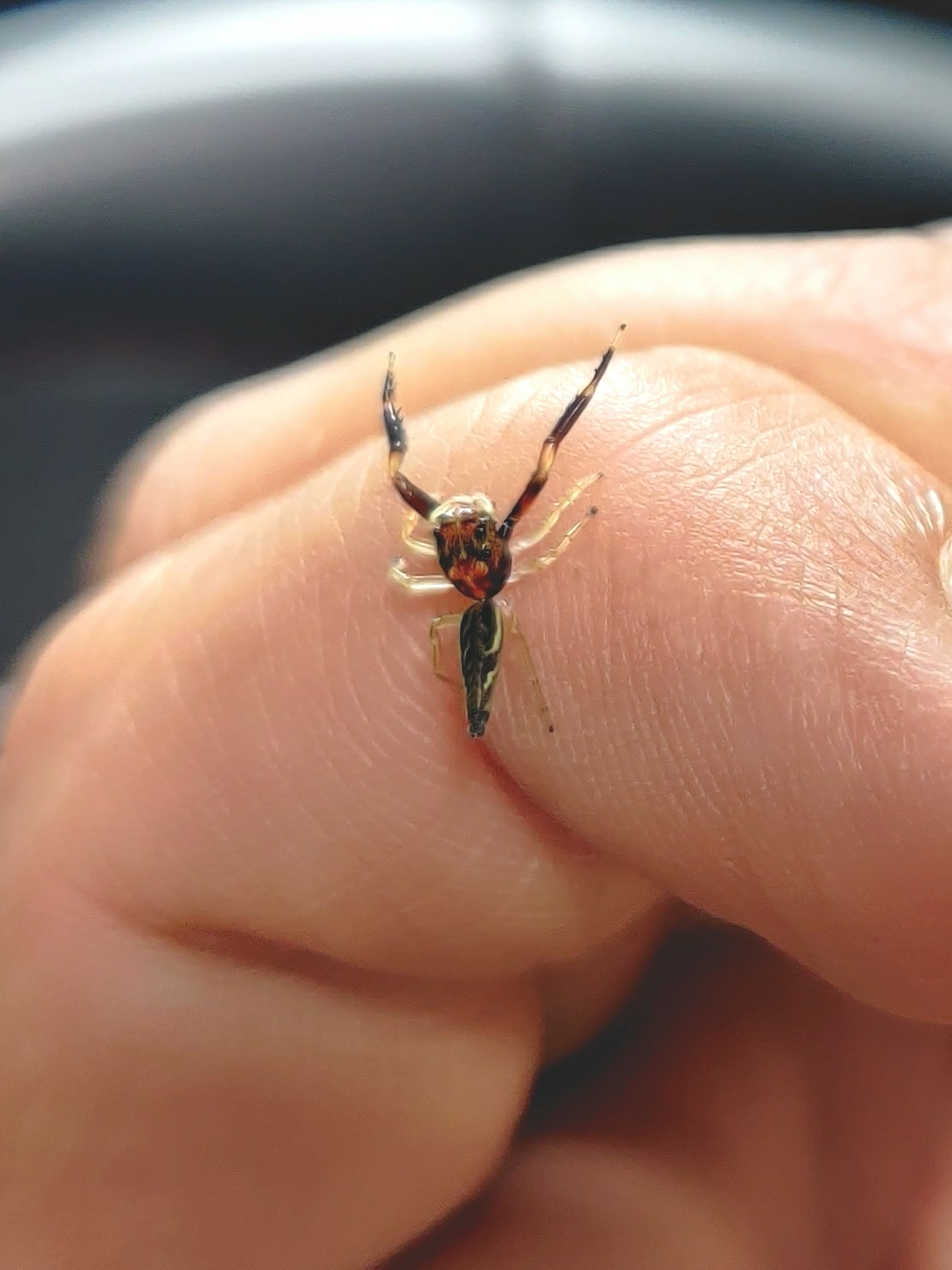

Scientific classification
- Kingdom: Animalia
- Phylum: Arthropoda
- Subphylum: Chelicerata
- Class: Arachnida
- Order: Araneae
- Infraorder: Araneomorphae
- Family: Salticidae
- Genus: Indopadilla
- Species: I. kodagura

Binomial name
- Indopadilla kodagura Maddison, 2020

= Indopadilla kodagura =

Species of spider

Indopadilla kodagura is a species of jumping spider which is endemic to the Western Ghats region in India.

== Description ==
Similar to I. insularis, this species is marked in dark brown and yellow, with a white face due to the clypeus being retracted to reveal a bright white arthrodial membrane. It shares a long, thin embolus with I. insularis, I. darjeeling, I. sonsorol, I. suhartoi, and I. thorelli, but its embolus is even longer, originating from the retrolateral basal corner of the bulb. Males have a carapace length of 2.6 mm and an abdomen length of 4.0 mm. The carapace is dark brown to black, with a narrow medial stripe and small yellow patches typical of Indopadilla. The clypeus is dark and extremely narrow, exposing the white arthrodial membrane. The chelicerae are dark with a lateral ridge bearing a tooth and at least five retromarginal teeth. The palp is yellow with a black cymbium, and the embolus is long and simple. The RTA is a flat blade. The legs contrast between dark brown or black first legs and yellowish posterior legs, with pale tarsi and honey-colored patches on the patella. The abdomen is black with two prominent yellow-white patches on each side.

== Range ==
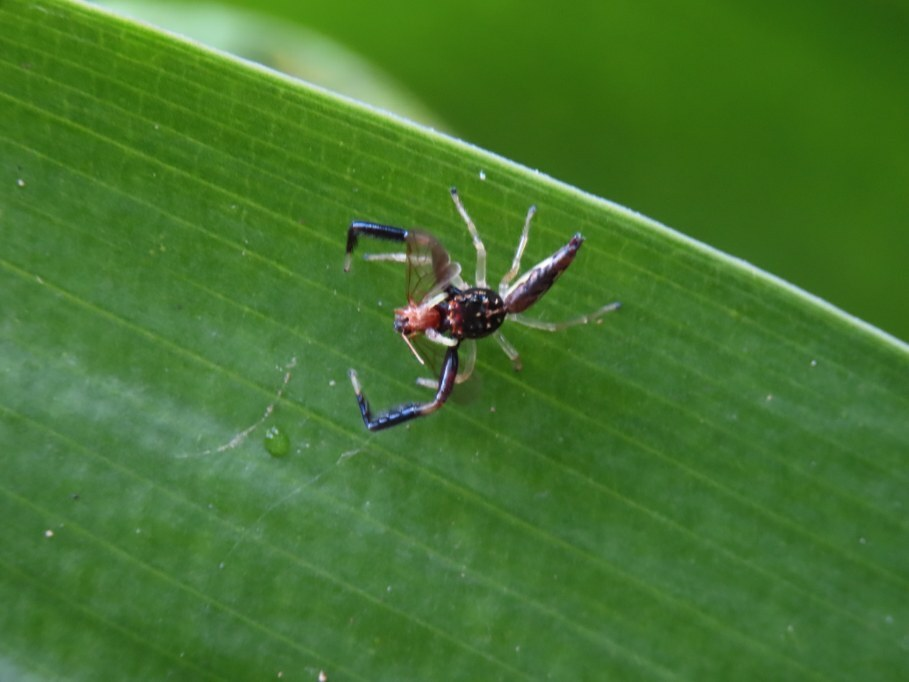
Feeding on prey, from type locality.

Currently only known from India. Type specimen was collected from Yevakapadi, Kodagu district of Karnataka state.

== Etymology ==
"Kodagura" is the name of Kodagu in Kodava language, the native language spoken in Kodagu, the type locality.
