= Padillothorus =

Scientific classification
- Kingdom: Animalia
- Phylum: Arthropoda
- Subphylum: Chelicerata
- Class: Arachnida
- Order: Araneae
- Infraorder: Araneomorphae
- Family: Salticidae
- Subfamily: incertae sedis
- Genus: Padillothorus; Prószyński, 2018
- Species: P. elegans

Binomial name
- Padillothorus elegans Prószyński, 2018

Synonyms
- Padillithorax elegans Reimoser, 1927 (misspelling); Stagetillus elegans (Reimoser, 1927)

Genus of spiders

Padillothorus is a genus of jumping spiders in the family Salticidae containing the single species, Padillothorus elegans. It was first described by Jerzy Prószyński in 2018, and has only been found in Indonesia.

In 1987, Prószyński synonymized the genus Padillothorax, first described by Eugène Simon in 1901, with Stagetillus. In 2017 and 2018, Prószyński restored Padillothorax, and separated it from the new genus Padillothorus. Simon had placed Padillothorax and Stagetillus in his group Bavieae, now the tribe Baviini in Maddison's 2015 classification of Salticidae. Since the male of Padillothorus elegans is unknown, Prószyński considered that classification to any group of genera was impossible.
