= Pseudomaevia =

Scientific classification
- Kingdom: Animalia
- Phylum: Arthropoda
- Subphylum: Chelicerata
- Class: Arachnida
- Order: Araneae
- Infraorder: Araneomorphae
- Family: Salticidae
- Subfamily: Salticinae
- Genus: Pseudomaevia; Rainbow, 1920

Type species
- P. cognata Rainbow, 1920

Species
- P. cognata Rainbow, 1920 – Australia (Lord Howe Is.); P. insulana Berland, 1942 – Polynesia; P. insulana Berland, 1942 – Tahiti

Genus of spiders

Pseudomaevia is a genus of jumping spiders that was first described by William Joseph Rainbow in 1920. As of August 2019 it contains only two species and one subspecies, found only in Australia, on the Polynesian Islands, and Tahiti: P. cognata, P. insulana, and P. i. aorai. The name is a combination of the Ancient Greek "pseudo-" (ψευδής), meaning "false", and the salticid genus Maevia.
