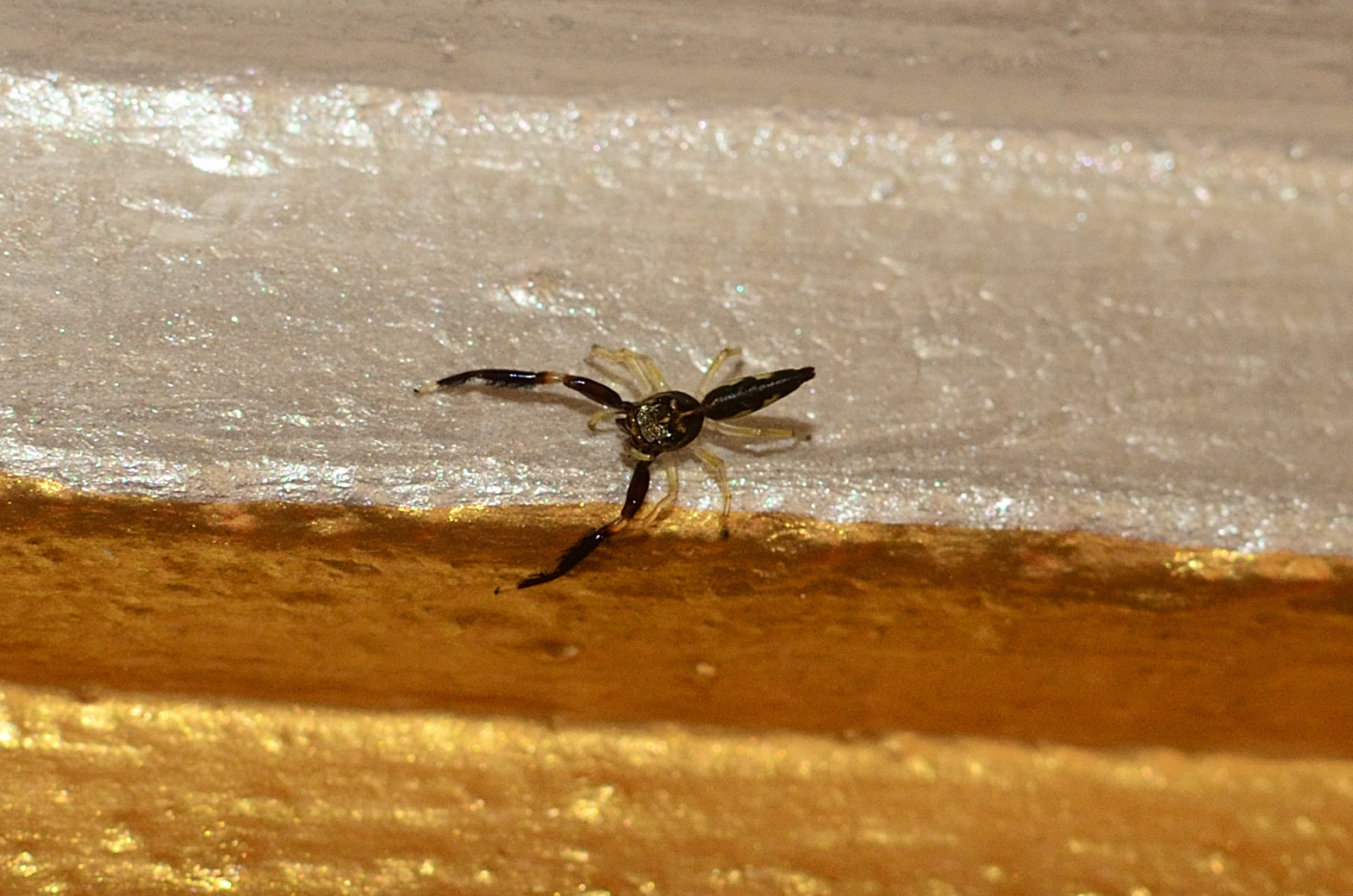
- From Balugalu, Karnataka, India.

Scientific classification
- Kingdom: Animalia
- Phylum: Arthropoda
- Subphylum: Chelicerata
- Class: Arachnida
- Order: Araneae
- Infraorder: Araneomorphae
- Family: Salticidae
- Genus: Indopadilla
- Species: I. insularis

Binomial name
- Indopadilla insularis Malamel, Sankaran & Sebastian, 2015

Synonyms
- Bavia insularis Malamel, Sankaran & Sebastian, 2015

= Indopadilla insularis =

Species of spider

Indopadilla insularis is a species of jumping spider from India.

== Taxonomy ==
The species was originally described and placed in Bavia, it was also indicated that the genus was in need of revision, since many of its species were unrelated to the generotype. The species was later put into a newly erected genus Indopadilla.

The specific epithet "insularis" is a Latin adjective and refers to the nature of the type locality of the species.

== Distribution ==
The species is currently known to occur in southern India. Its type locality is Pathiramanal Island of Kerala.
