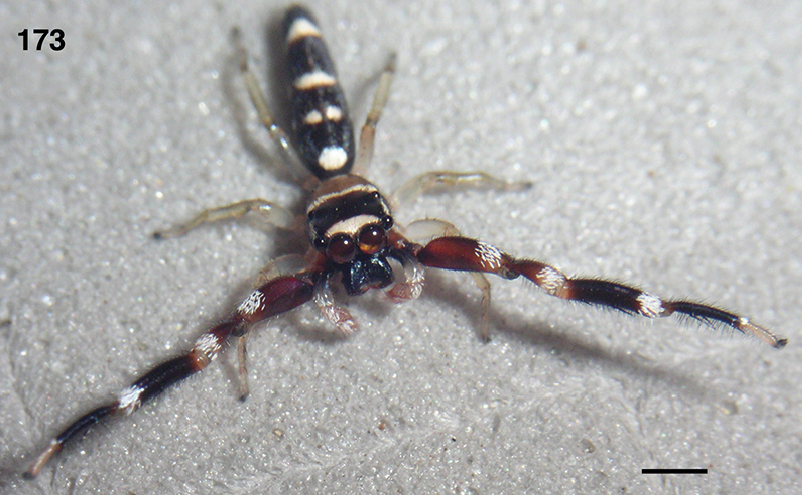

Scientific classification
- Kingdom: Animalia
- Phylum: Arthropoda
- Subphylum: Chelicerata
- Class: Arachnida
- Order: Araneae
- Infraorder: Araneomorphae
- Family: Salticidae
- Subfamily: Salticinae
- Genus: Padillothorax; Simon, 1901

Type species
- P. semiostrinus Simon, 1901

Species
- See text.

= Padillothorax =

Genus of spiders

Padillothorax is a genus of southeastern Asian jumping spiders first described by Eugène Simon in 1901.

== Taxonomy ==
First described by Eugène Simon in 1901, Padillothorax was synonymized with Stagetillus by Jerzy Prószyński in 1987. Stagetillus was placed in the tribe Baviini, part of the Salticoida clade of the subfamily Salticinae by Wayne Maddison in 2015, on the basis of molecular phylogenetic evidence, although only a single unidentified species of Stagetillus from Selangor was included in the analysis. In 2017, Prószyński recognized the genus again, but did not include the type species, Padillothorax semiostrinus, so his action was not valid under the International Code of Zoological Nomenclature. He included this species in 2018, thus successfully reviving the genus. He also transferred a species included in Padillothorax by Reimoser in 1927 to a new genus Padillothorus, leaving two species in Padillothorax.

=== Species ===
As of January 2021, the World Spider Catalog accepted the following species:

- Padillothorax badut Maddison, 2020 – Malaysia (Borneo)
- Padillothorax casteti (Simon, 1900) – India
- Padillothorax exilis (Cao & Li, 2016) – China
- Padillothorax flavopunctus (Kanesharatnam & Benjamin, 2018) – Sri Lanka
- Padillothorax mulu Maddison, 2020 – Malaysia (Borneo)
- Padillothorax semiostrinus Simon, 1901 (type species) – Malaysia (peninsula), Singapore, Taiwan?
- Padillothorax taprobanicus Simon, 1902 – Sri Lanka
