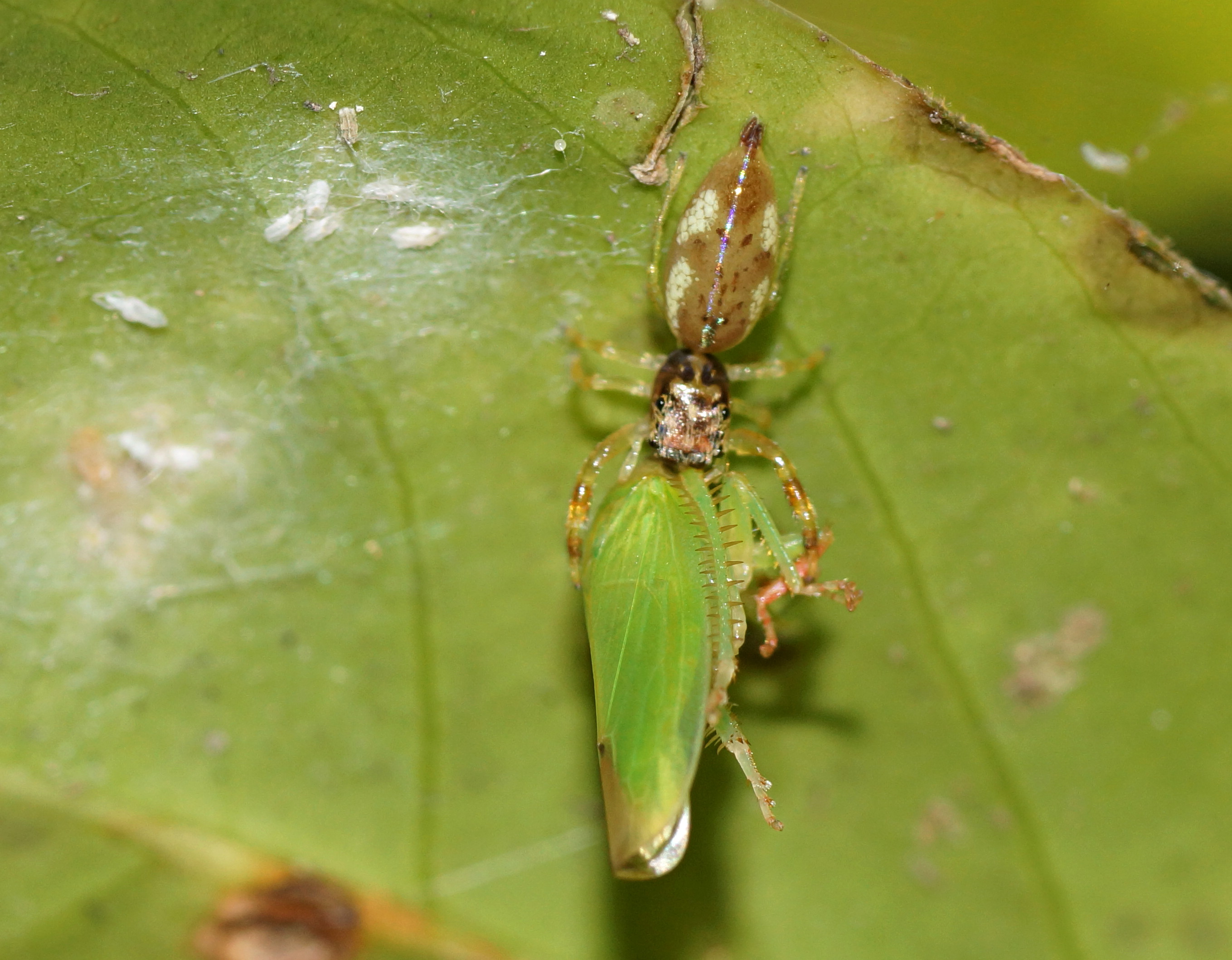

Scientific classification
- Kingdom: Animalia
- Phylum: Arthropoda
- Subphylum: Chelicerata
- Class: Arachnida
- Order: Araneae
- Infraorder: Araneomorphae
- Family: Salticidae
- Genus: Bavia
- Species: B. kairali

Binomial name
- Bavia kairali Samson & Sebastian, 2002

= Bavia kairali =

Species of spider

Bavia kairali is a possible species of jumping spider in the genus Bavia. It is endemic to India. As of July 2023, the species was not accepted by the World Spider Catalog as the name is a nomen nudum.

== Description ==
The cephalothorax of the male is black in colour and that of the female is brownish.
