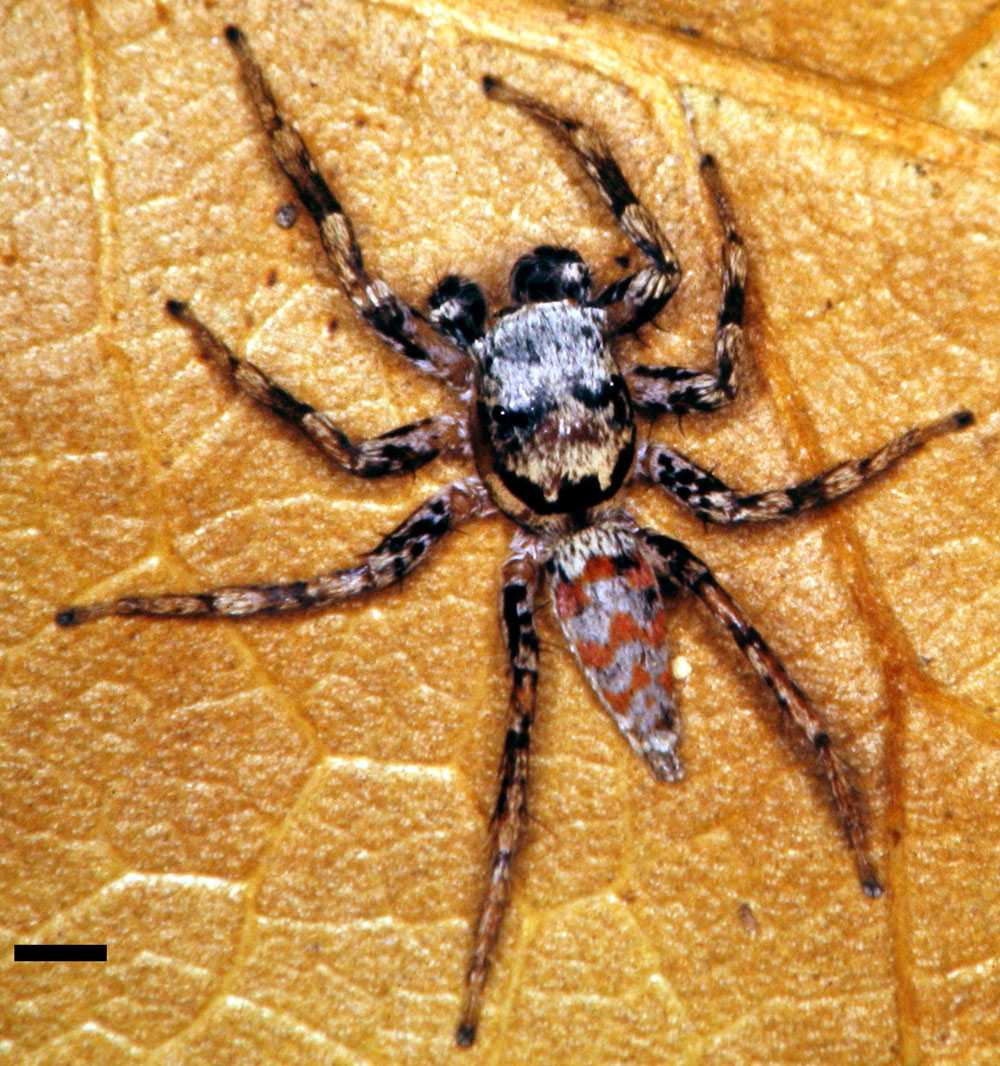

Scientific classification
- Kingdom: Animalia
- Phylum: Arthropoda
- Subphylum: Chelicerata
- Class: Arachnida
- Order: Araneae
- Infraorder: Araneomorphae
- Family: Salticidae
- Genus: Paramaevia
- Species: P. michelsoni

Binomial name
- Paramaevia michelsoni Barnes, 1955

= Paramaevia michelsoni =

Species of spider

Paramaevia michelsoni is a species of jumping spider in the family Salticidae. It is found in the United States.
