= Padillothorax taprobanicus =

Scientific classification
- Kingdom: Animalia
- Phylum: Arthropoda
- Subphylum: Chelicerata
- Class: Arachnida
- Order: Araneae
- Infraorder: Araneomorphae
- Family: Salticidae
- Genus: Padillothorax
- Species: P. taprobanicus

Binomial name
- Padillothorax taprobanicus Simon, 1902

Synonyms
- Stagetillus taprobanicus (Simon, 1902)

Species of spider

Padillothorax taprobanicus is a species of spider of the genus Padillothorax. It is endemic to Sri Lanka.
