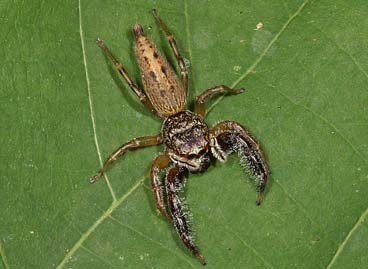
- female from Okinawa
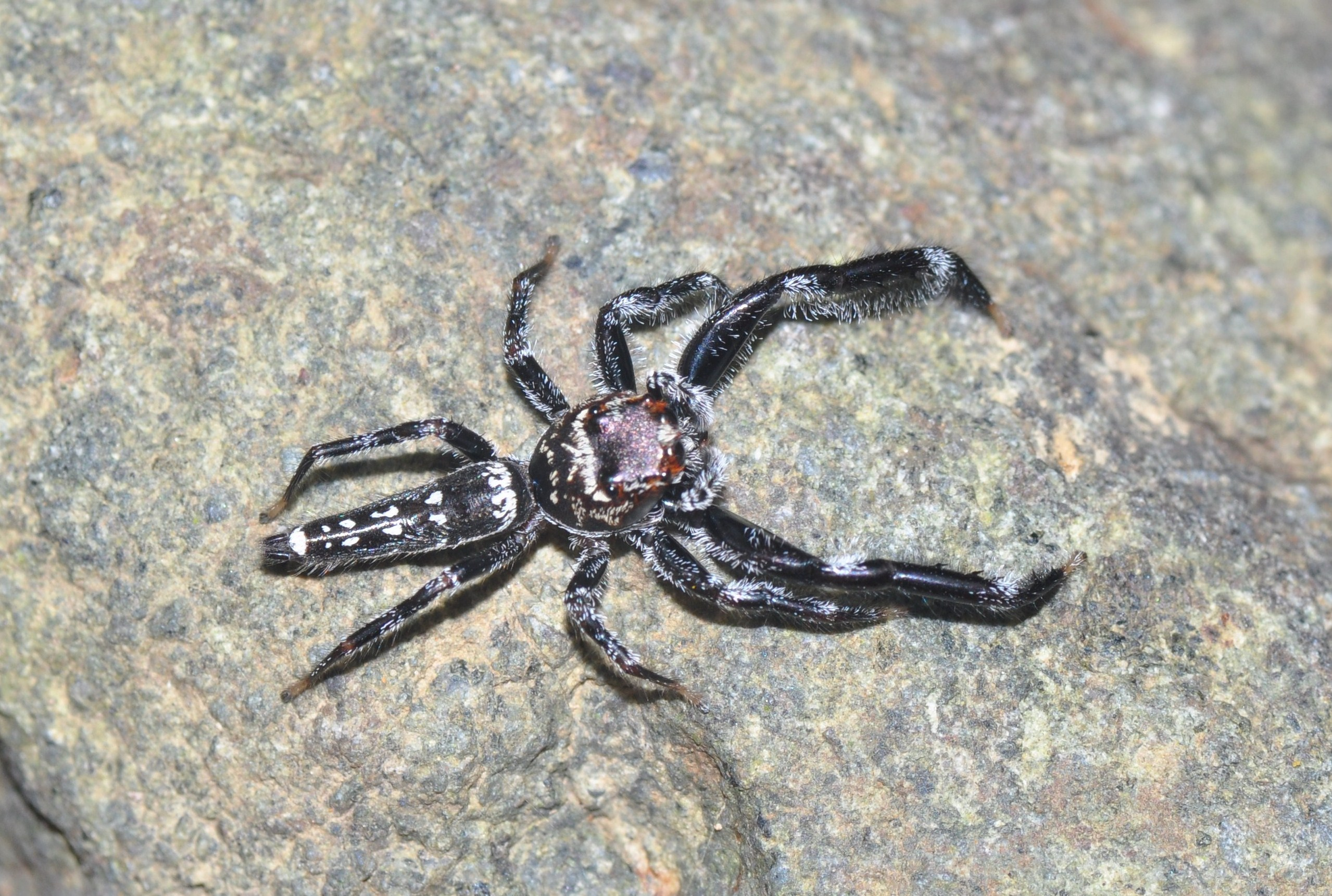
- male

Scientific classification
- Kingdom: Animalia
- Phylum: Arthropoda
- Subphylum: Chelicerata
- Class: Arachnida
- Order: Araneae
- Infraorder: Araneomorphae
- Family: Salticidae
- Genus: Bavia
- Species: B. sexpunctata

Binomial name
- Bavia sexpunctata (Doleschall, 1859)

Synonyms
- Salticus sexpunctatus Doleschall, 1859; Marptusa sexpunctata (Thorell, 1878); Acompse dulcinervis L. Koch, 1879

= Bavia sexpunctata =

Species of spider

Bavia sexpunctata is a species of jumping spider in the genus Bavia. It was first described by Carl Ludwig Doleschall in 1859 as Salticus sexpunctatus. The species has a wide distribution across Southeast Asia and the Pacific, ranging from Malaysia and Indonesia to Japan and Australia.

== Taxonomy ==
The species was originally described by Doleschall in 1859 as Salticus sexpunctatus based on a male specimen from Amboina. Tamerlan Thorell later described the female in 1878 under the name Marptusa sexpunctata. Ludwig Carl Christian Koch independently described what is now recognized as the same species in 1879 as Acompse dulcinervis. The species was transferred to the genus Bavia by Eugène Simon in 1905, when he synonymized it with Bavia dulcinervis.

== Distribution ==
B. sexpunctata has been recorded from Malaysia, Indonesia (including Sumatra), Vietnam, Japan (particularly the Ryukyu Islands), and Australia. In Japan, it has been found on Iriomote Island in Okinawa Prefecture.

== Description ==
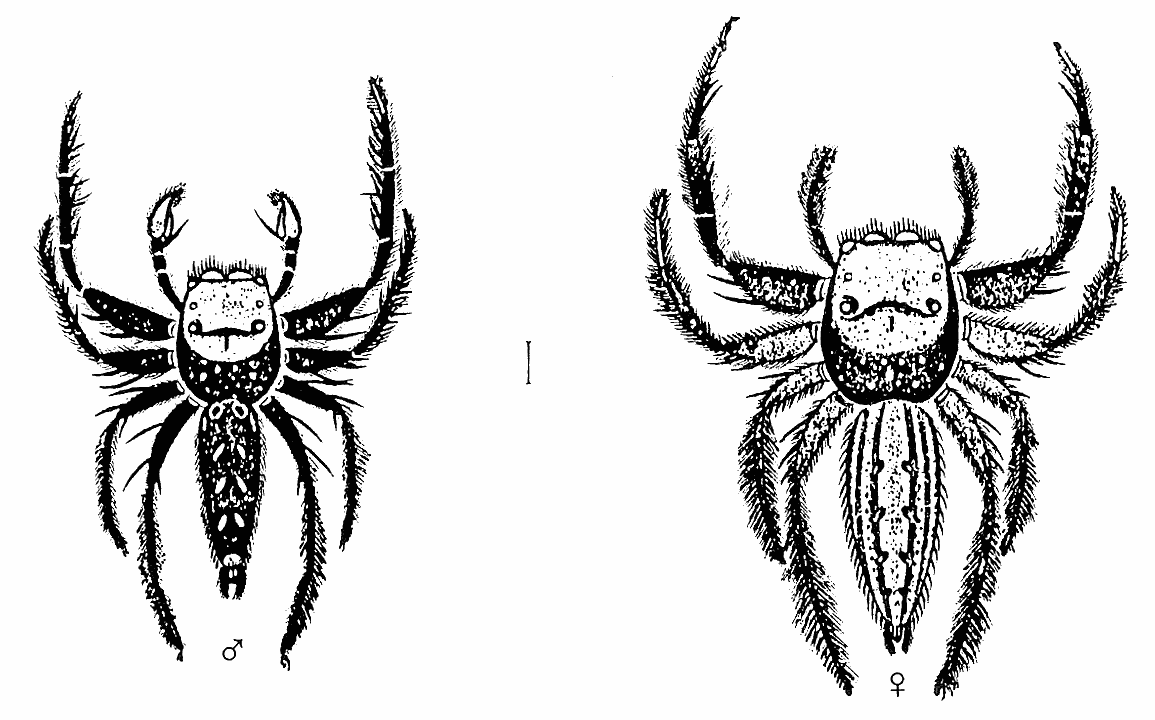
male and female from Australia (from Koch 1879)

Bavia sexpunctata is a relatively large jumping spider compared to other members of the Baviini tribe. Females have a body length of 8.60–9.30 mm, while males are slightly smaller at 8.55 mm. The carapace length ranges from 3.64 to 4.30 mm in females and 3.64 mm in males.

The carapace is characteristically hexagonal in shape and relatively broad, being widest at or just behind the posterior lateral eyes, which is typical of the genus Bavia. The female has a dark brown carapace with black surroundings around the eyes. The first pair of legs is dark brown except for light brown tarsi, while the remaining legs are light brown. The abdomen is light brown with numerous small dark brown spots and three pairs of larger spots.

Males have similar coloration but with slight differences. The carapace is dark brown with black eye surroundings, and the abdomen is light brown mottled with dark brown and featuring three pairs of pale brown spots.
