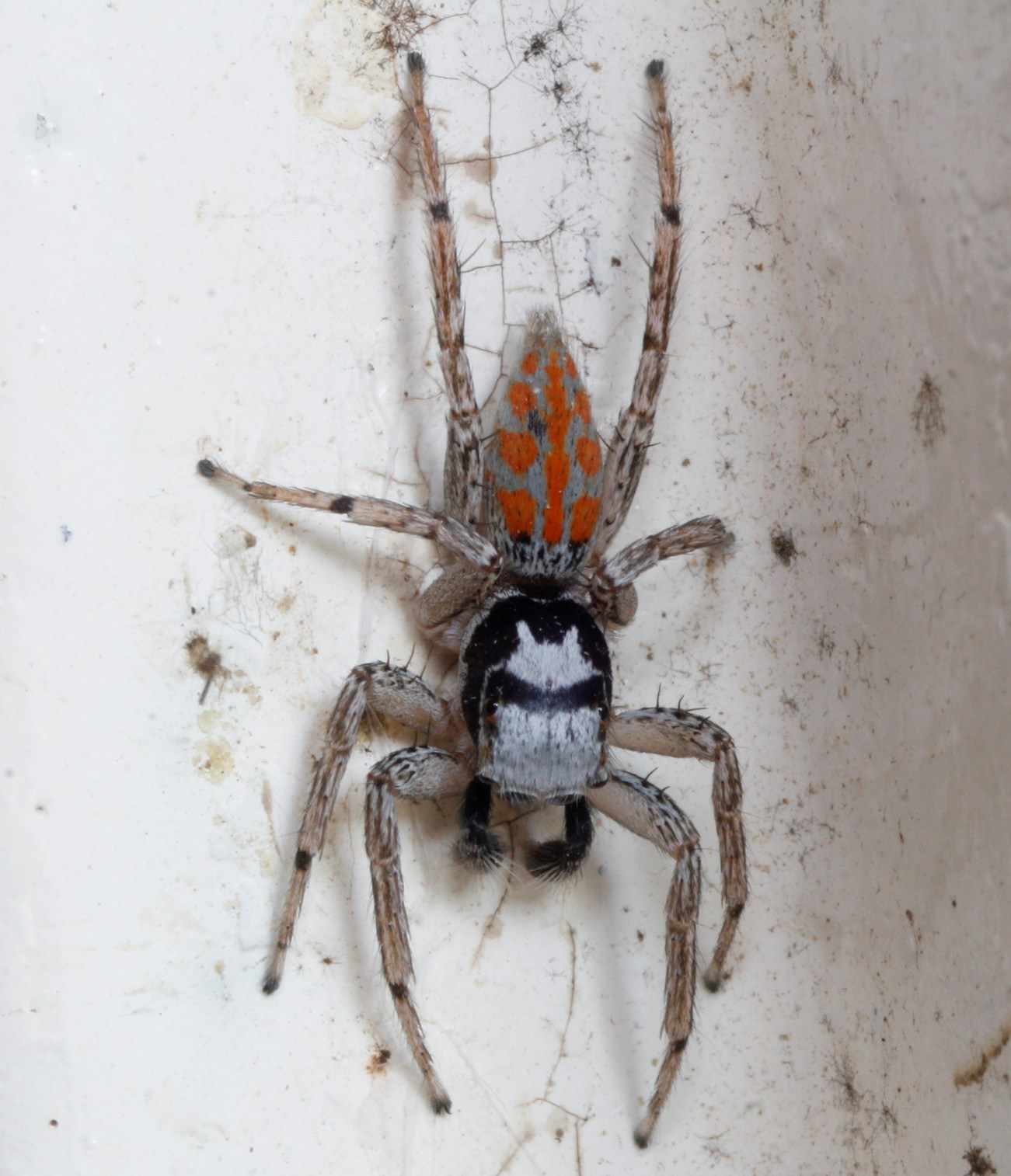

Scientific classification
- Kingdom: Animalia
- Phylum: Arthropoda
- Subphylum: Chelicerata
- Class: Arachnida
- Order: Araneae
- Infraorder: Araneomorphae
- Family: Salticidae
- Genus: Paramaevia
- Species: P. poultoni

Binomial name
- Paramaevia poultoni Peckham & Peckham, 1901

= Paramaevia poultoni =

Species of spider

Paramaevia poultoni is a species of jumping spider in the family Salticidae. It is found in the United States and Mexico.
