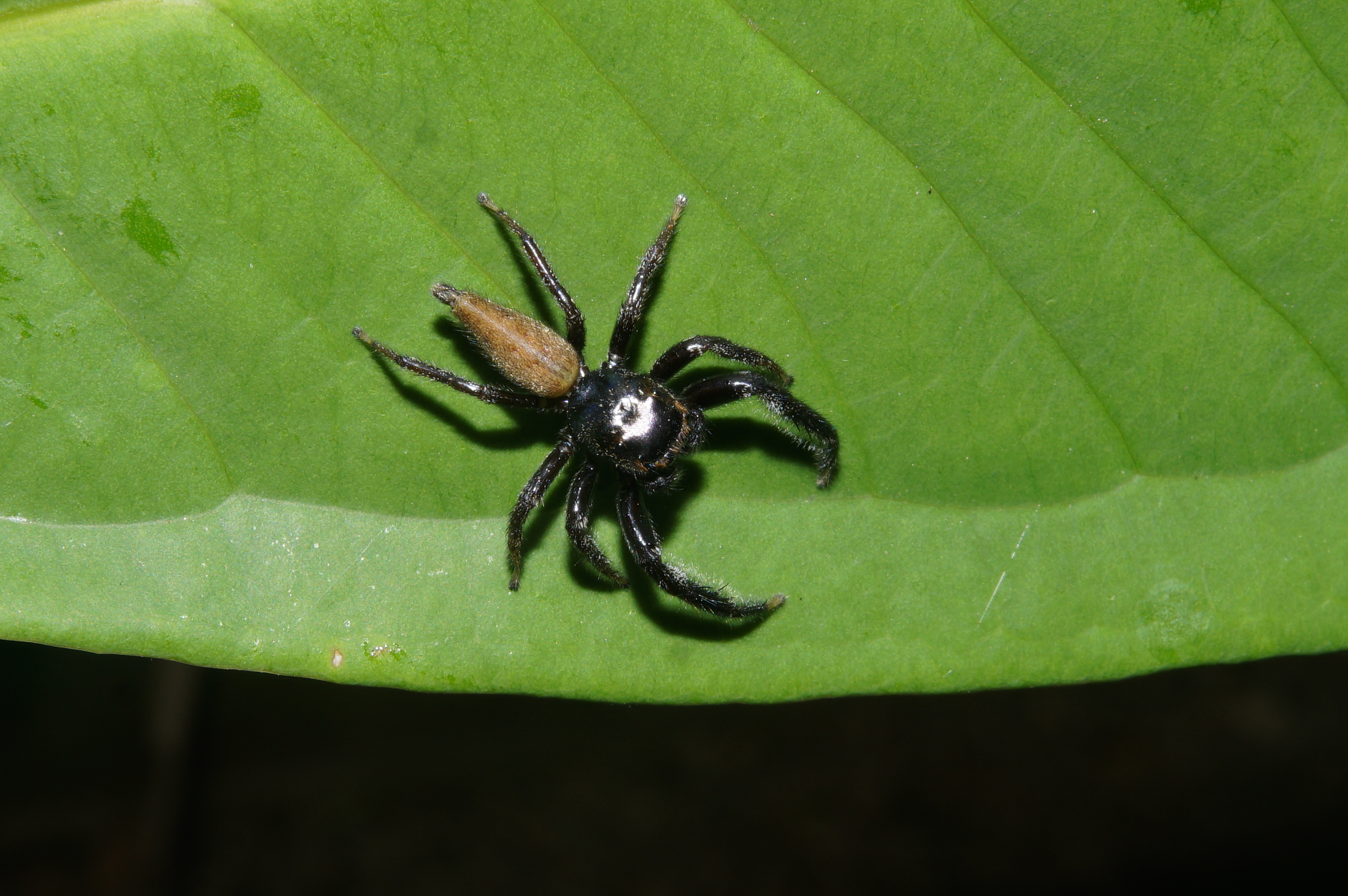

Scientific classification
- Kingdom: Animalia
- Phylum: Arthropoda
- Subphylum: Chelicerata
- Class: Arachnida
- Order: Araneae
- Infraorder: Araneomorphae
- Family: Salticidae
- Genus: Bavia
- Species: B. aericeps

Binomial name
- Bavia aericeps Simon, 1877

Synonyms
- Acompse suavis

= Bavia aericeps =

Species of spider

Bavia aericeps is the type species of the jumping spider genus Bavia. In its distribution range it is the most commonly found species of its genus.

== Description ==
The cephalothorax is brown, with some white hairs and patches, a darker eye region and black eye surrounds. The long opisthosoma is also brown, with dark brown patches and small white dots running along its length in males, and a broad median yellow stripe in females. The slender legs are yellowish-brown with dark brown femora, with the exception of the first pair, which is long, robust, and held in a way resembling a scorpion.

== Distribution ==
Bavia aericeps is found from Malaysia to Australia, and on several Pacific Islands.
