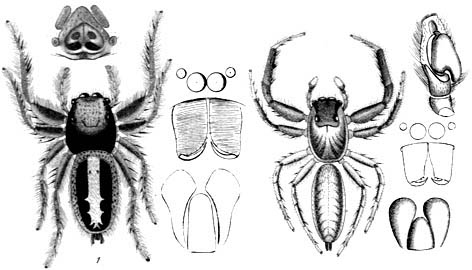
- Sandalodes superbus

Scientific classification
- Kingdom: Animalia
- Phylum: Arthropoda
- Subphylum: Chelicerata
- Class: Arachnida
- Order: Araneae
- Infraorder: Araneomorphae
- Family: Salticidae
- Subfamily: Salticinae
- Genus: Sandalodes; Keyserling, 1883

Type species
- S. bipenicillatus (Keyserling, 1882)

Species
- 9, see text

Synonyms
- Karschiolina Brignoli, 1985

= Sandalodes =

Genus of spiders

Sandalodes is a genus of jumping spiders that was first described by Eugen von Keyserling in 1883. S. scopifer, a black spider with white markings, is a common species in eucalypt forests on the Darling Downs.

== Species ==
As of August 2019 it contains nine species, found only in Papua New Guinea, Australia, and on Sulawesi:

- Sandalodes albovittatus (Keyserling, 1883) – Australia (Queensland)
- Sandalodes bernsteini (Thorell, 1881) – New Guinea
- Sandalodes bipenicillatus (Keyserling, 1882) (type) – Australia (Queensland, New South Wales)
- Sandalodes celebensis Merian, 1911 – Indonesia (Sulawesi)
- Sandalodes joannae Zabka, 2000 – Australia (Western Australia)
- Sandalodes minahassae Merian, 1911 – Indonesia (Sulawesi)
- Sandalodes pumicatus (Thorell, 1881) – New Guinea
- Sandalodes scopifer (Karsch, 1878) – New Guinea, Australia
- Sandalodes superbus (Karsch, 1878) – New Guinea, Australia
