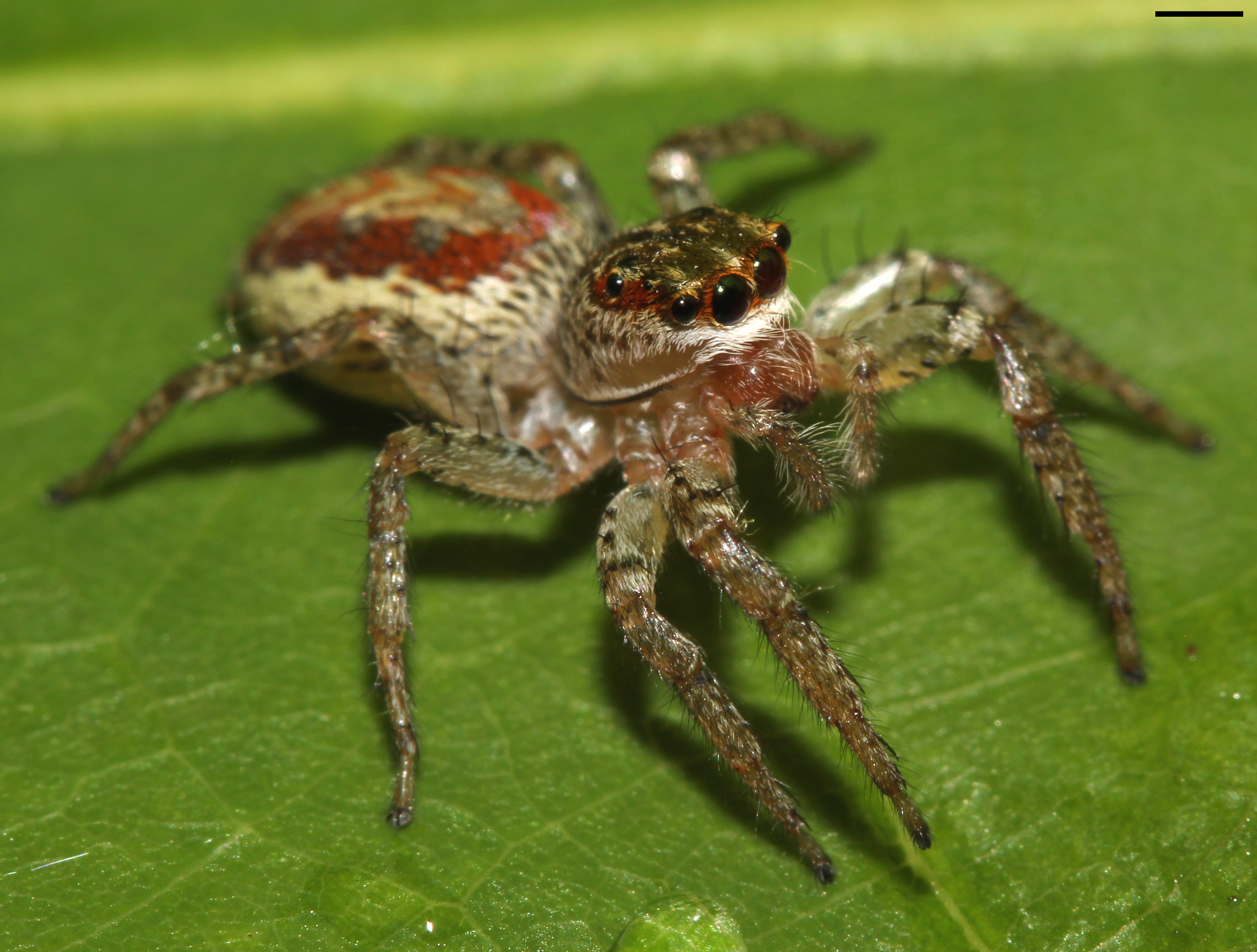
- Female
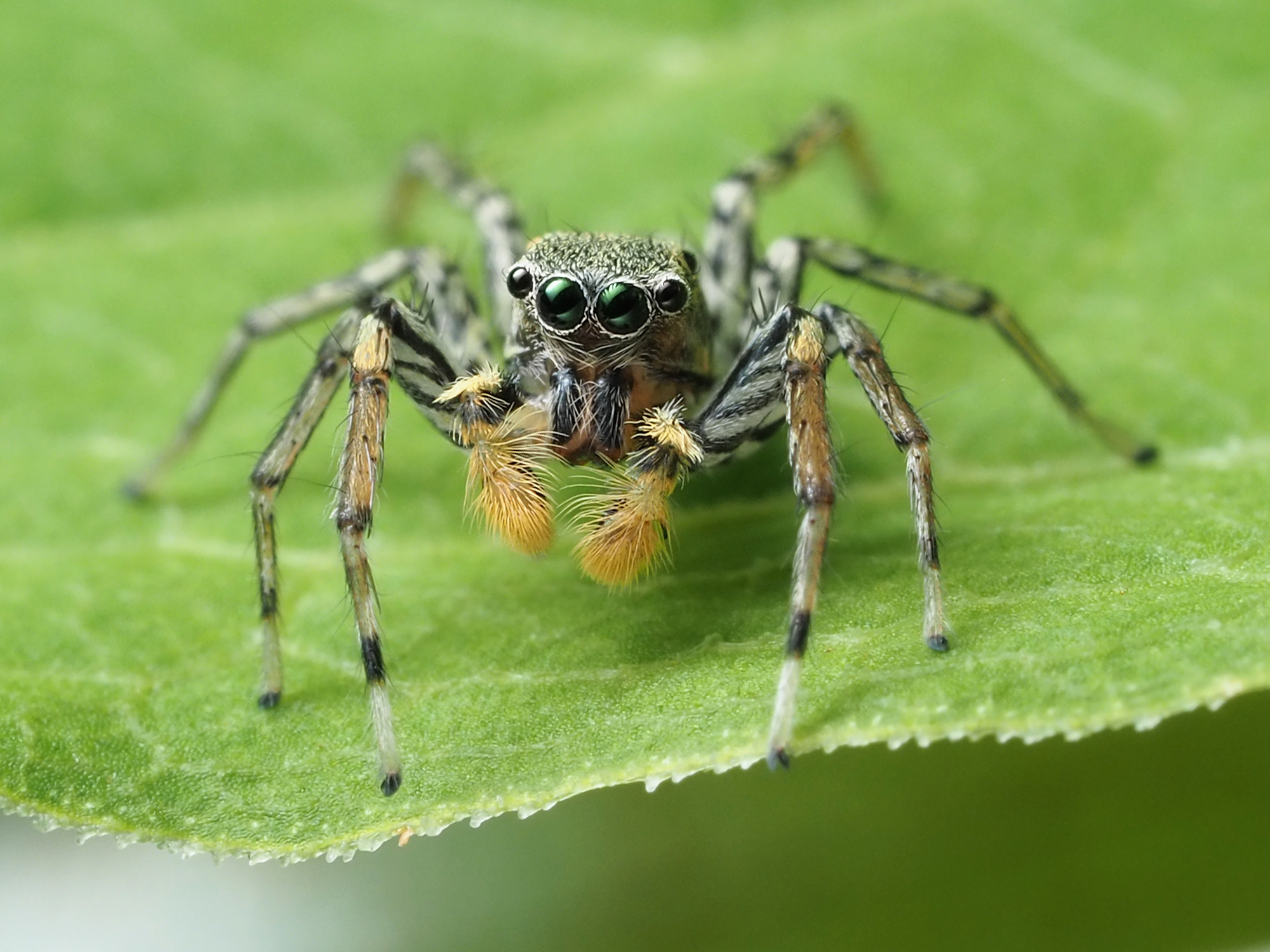
- Male (gray morph)

Scientific classification
- Kingdom: Animalia
- Phylum: Arthropoda
- Subphylum: Chelicerata
- Class: Arachnida
- Order: Araneae
- Infraorder: Araneomorphae
- Family: Salticidae
- Genus: Maevia
- Species: M. inclemens

Binomial name
- Maevia inclemens (Walckenaer, 1837)

Synonyms
- Attus inclemens Walckenaer, 1837; Attus ictericus Walckenaer, 1837 (in part); Attus protervus Walckenaer, 1837 (preoccupied); Attus aspergatus Walckenaer, 1837; Attus vittatus Hentz, 1846; Attus niger Hentz, 1846; Maevia pennicillata C. L. Koch, 1846; Maevia annulipes C. L. Koch, 1846; Plexippus undatus C. L. Koch, 1846; Attus petulans Marx, 1890 (replacement name); Maevia vittata Emerton, 1891; Maevia penicillata Prószyński, 1984

= Maevia inclemens =

Dimorphic Jumping Spider

Species of spider

Maevia inclemens or the dimorphic jumping spider is a relatively common and colorful jumping spider of North America. In the males there are two forms, a very rare phenomenon in zoology. These use different courting displays, and differ in appearance: the "tufted" morph has a black body and pedipalps ("palps"), three black tufts across its "head", and pale legs; and the "gray" morph has black and white stripes all over its body and legs, orange palps, and no tufts. However, each form accounts for 50% of the adult males, and they are equally successful in mating.

Like all jumping spiders, M. inclemens has excellent vision. The main eyes, in the front-and-center position, are large, and are more acute than those of a cat and about 10 times as acute as a dragonfly's. The remaining three pairs of eyes are along the sides of the head, and work as motion detectors. The eyes are used for hunting, for avoiding threats and for finding mates.

Maevia inclemens is one of the eight species in genus Maevia. The species was first called Attus inclemens, and other names have been used. The two male forms look and behave so differently that they were originally considered two distinct species. In 1955 Robert Barnes chose M. inclemens, and this has become the standard name.

The species is found in south-eastern Canada, and in the eastern United States. M. inclemens is frequently seen on man-made structures such as outbuildings or fences.

== Taxonomy ==
Maevia inclemens is the type species for the genus Maevia (C.L. Koch, 1850), which includes another 10 species in May 2011. The species name is derived from Latin adjective inclēmens "cruel, harsh" or "rough". The species was first called Attus inclemens, and other names including Attus vittatus, Maevia pencillata, and Maevia vittata.^{[a]} Also the two male forms look and behave so differently that they were originally considered two distinct species. In 1955 Robert Barnes chose M. inclemens, and this has become the standard name.

== Description ==
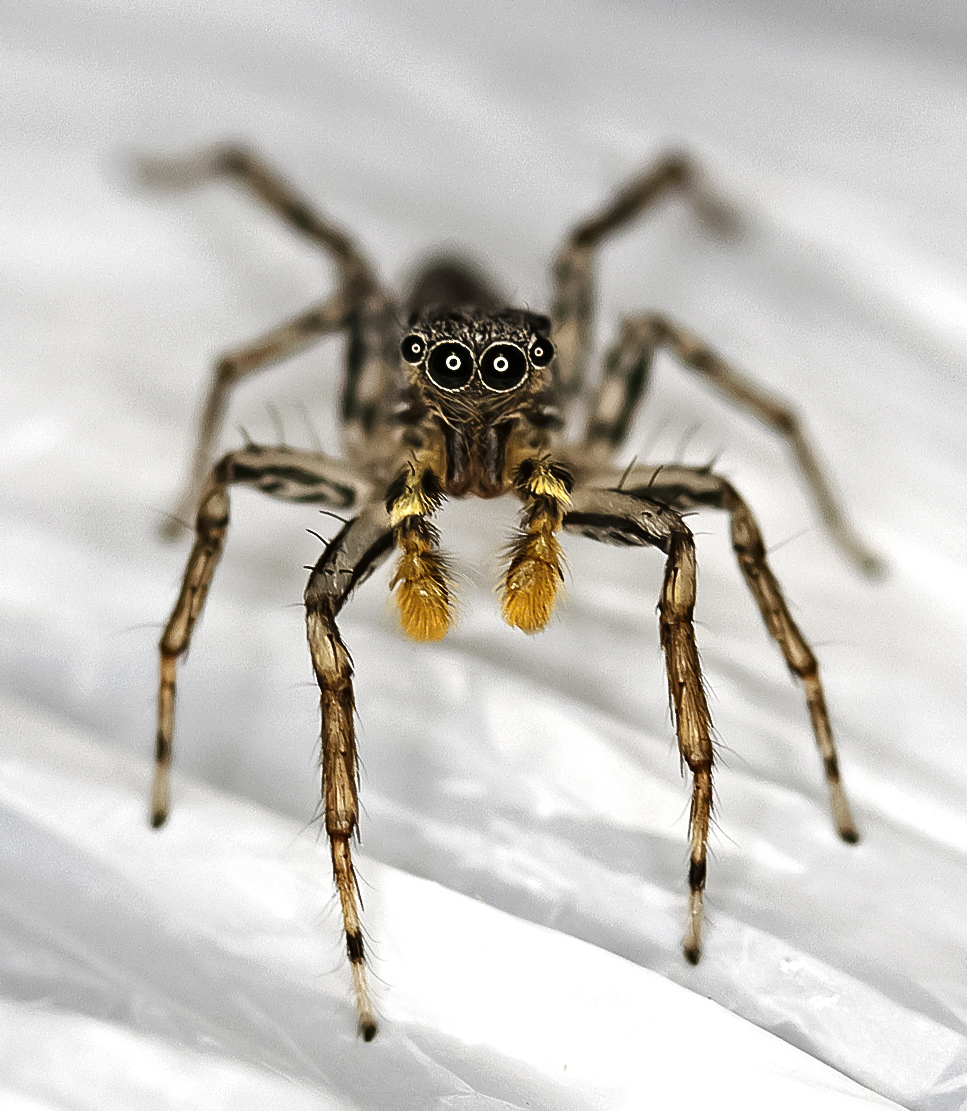
Male, grey morph

Spiders are chelicerates, which differ from other arthropods in that the usual body segments are fused into only two tagmata, the cephalothorax and abdomen. Spiders' abdomens bear appendages that have been modified into spinnerets that extrude silk from up to six types of silk glands within their abdomen. The cephalothorax and abdomen are joined by a small, cylindrical pedicel, which allows the abdomen to move while spinning silk. While most jumping spiders do not build webs to catch prey, they use silk for other purposes, including molting and laying eggs.

Jumping spiders have large forelegs and short, powerful back legs. Unlike most arthropods, spiders have no extensor muscles in their limbs and instead extend them by increasing their blood pressure. Jumping spiders can leap several times their own length by powerfully extending the third or fourth pairs of legs, reaching up to 200 millimetres (7.9 in) with the forelimbs extended to grasp the prey. Spiders maintain balance when walking, so that legs 1 and 3 on one side and 2 and 4 on the other side are moving, while the other four legs are on the surface. To run faster, spiders increase their stride frequency.

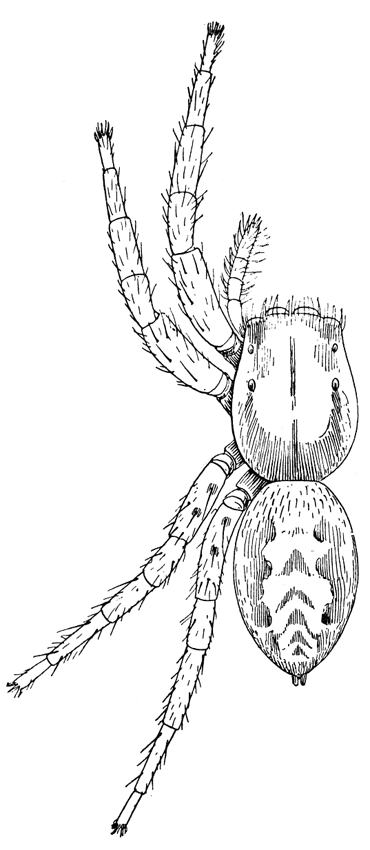
Illustration of female

Illustration of female

Illustration of male

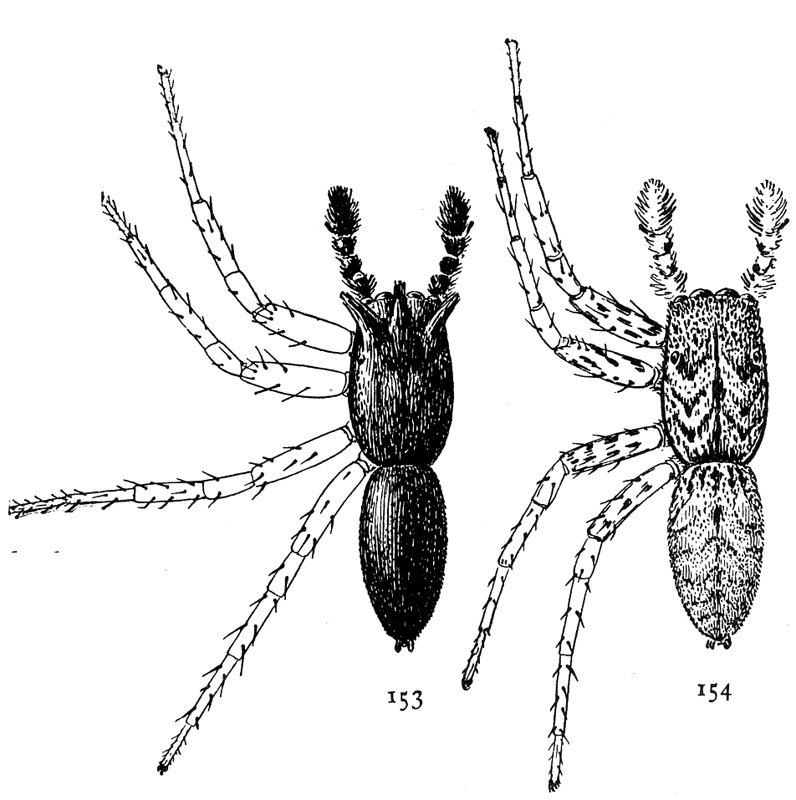
Illustration of males

In spiders and other chelicerates, there is only one pair of appendages before the mouth, and in spiders these are modified into fangs that inject venom into the prey. Behind the mouth is a pair of pedipalps ("palps" for short), and those of male spiders are quite large and are used for displaying and mating.

Spiders groom themselves regularly, and more often if wet or dirty. They moisten their fangs, draw the legs one at a time through the fangs, and "comb" the legs with the fangs and palps. The first and fourth pairs of legs are then used to groom other parts of the body, and the only place they appear not to reach is the dorsal surface of the carapace.

Diamorphic jumping spider in family Salticidae on tree trunk.

The body of M. inclemens is only sparsely covered with hairs and scales. A female of Maevia inclemens is 6.5 to 8.0 millimetres (0.26 to 0.31 in) long, her carapace is light brown, her legs are pale and unmarked. The top of her abdomen is chalky or rusty colored, and along each side is a black band, often thinly covered with orange scales. Sometimes there is series of chevrons (V-shaped markings) along the middle of her abdomen. She has a prominent white stripe below the foremost eyes. There are spines on the first and second pair of her legs, but her body never has tufts of hair. Males are 4.75 to 6.50 millimetres (0.187 to 0.256 in) long, and their carapaces are light to dark brown, with a black line around the edge. There usually is a pair of large lighter areas between the last pair of eyes halfway down the back of the carapace. The eyes are surrounded by black. Males occur in two forms, a very rare phenomenon in zoology. The "tufted" morph has a totally black body, black pedipalps, white legs and three tufts of bristles on the front part of the cephalothorax. The "gray" male morph has a black and white striped body, a prominent white stripe on the foremost eyes, striped legs and bright orange pedipalps, and no tufts.

Jumping spiders have a distinctive rectangular carapace, and that of female Maevia inclemens average 2.30 millimetres (0.091 in) wide, while the carapaces of males average 2.10 millimetres (0.083 in). The carapace of M. inclemens is fairly high, between 60% and 70% of the width.

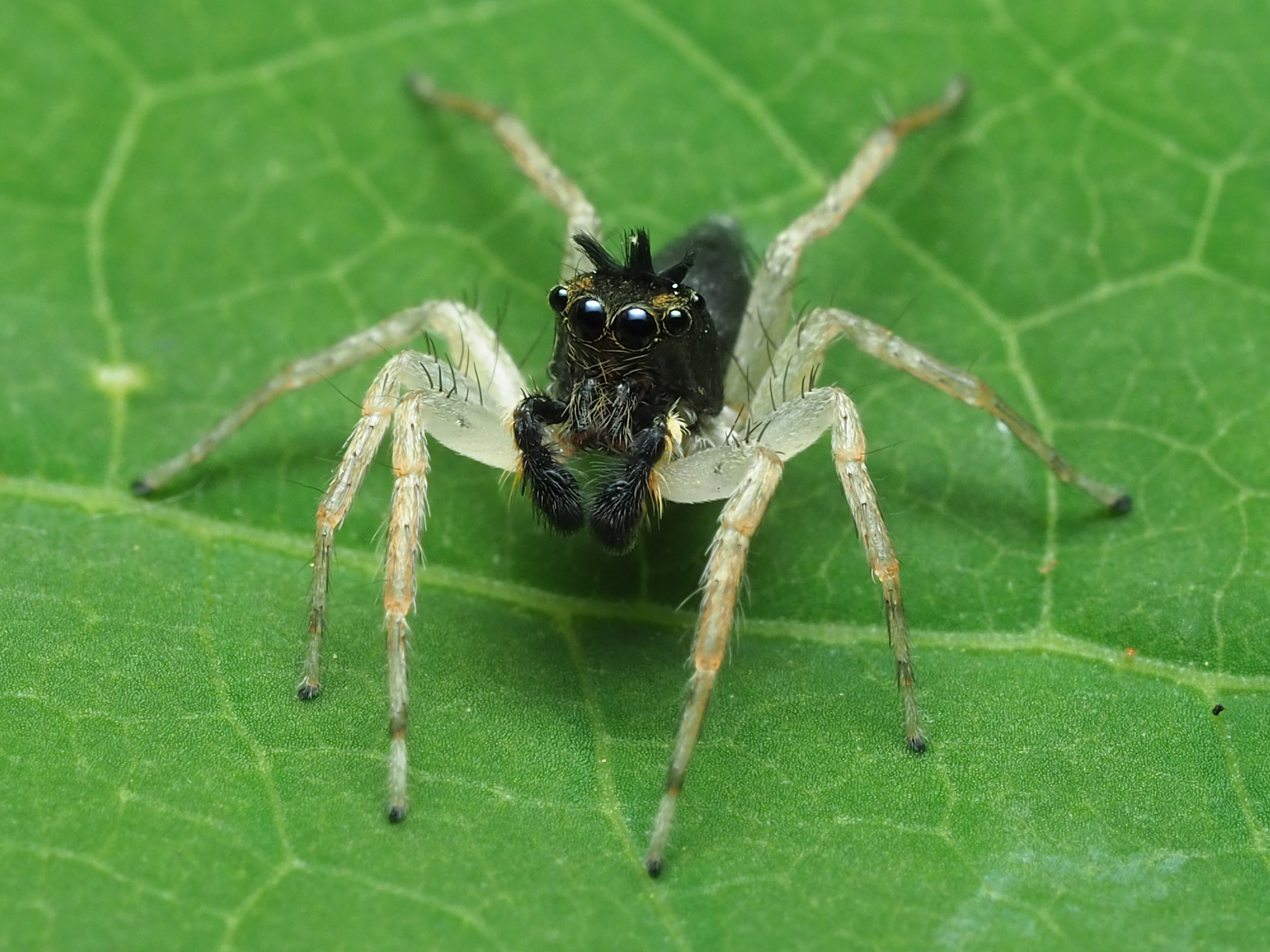
Male, dark morph

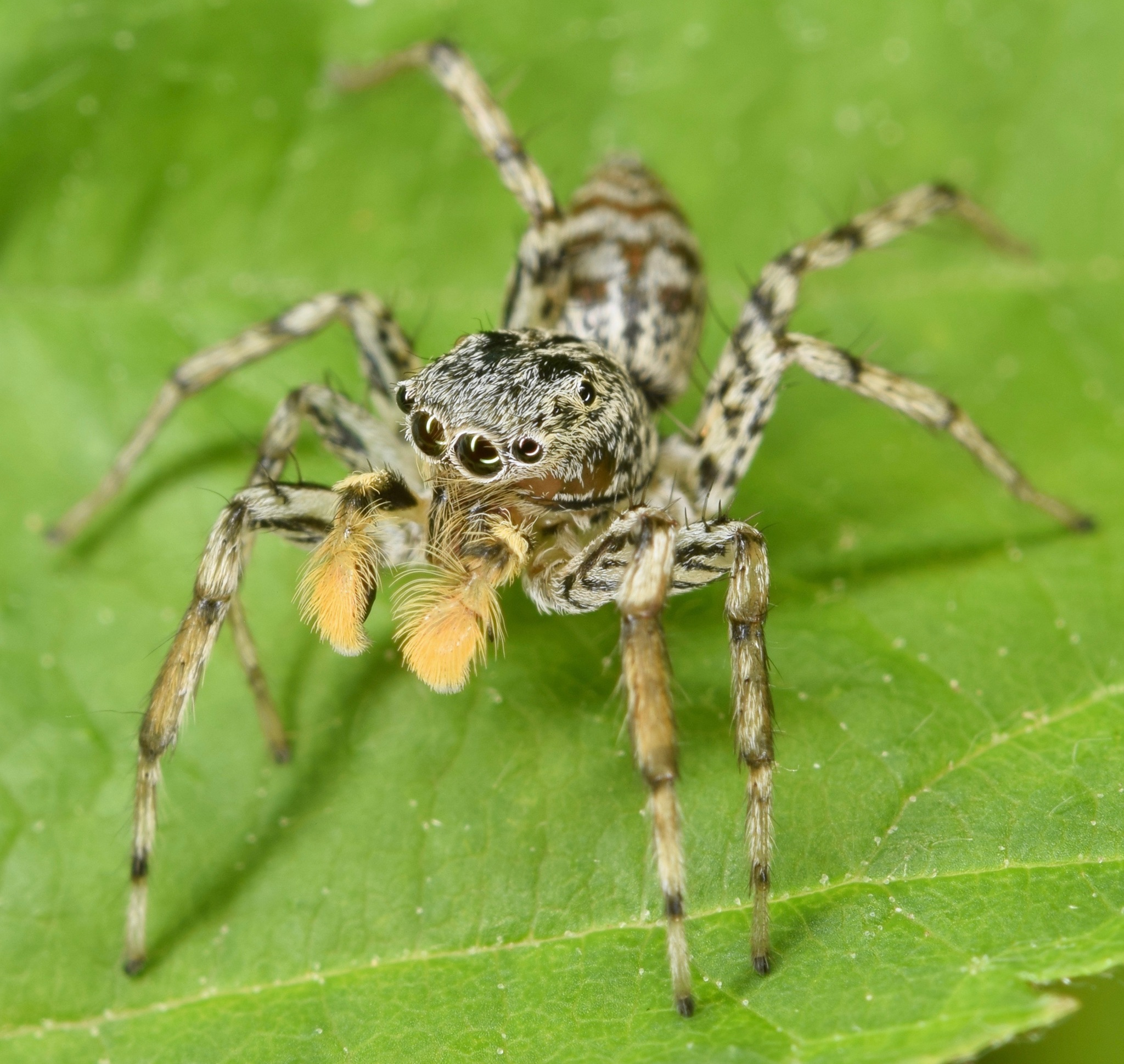
Male, gray morph

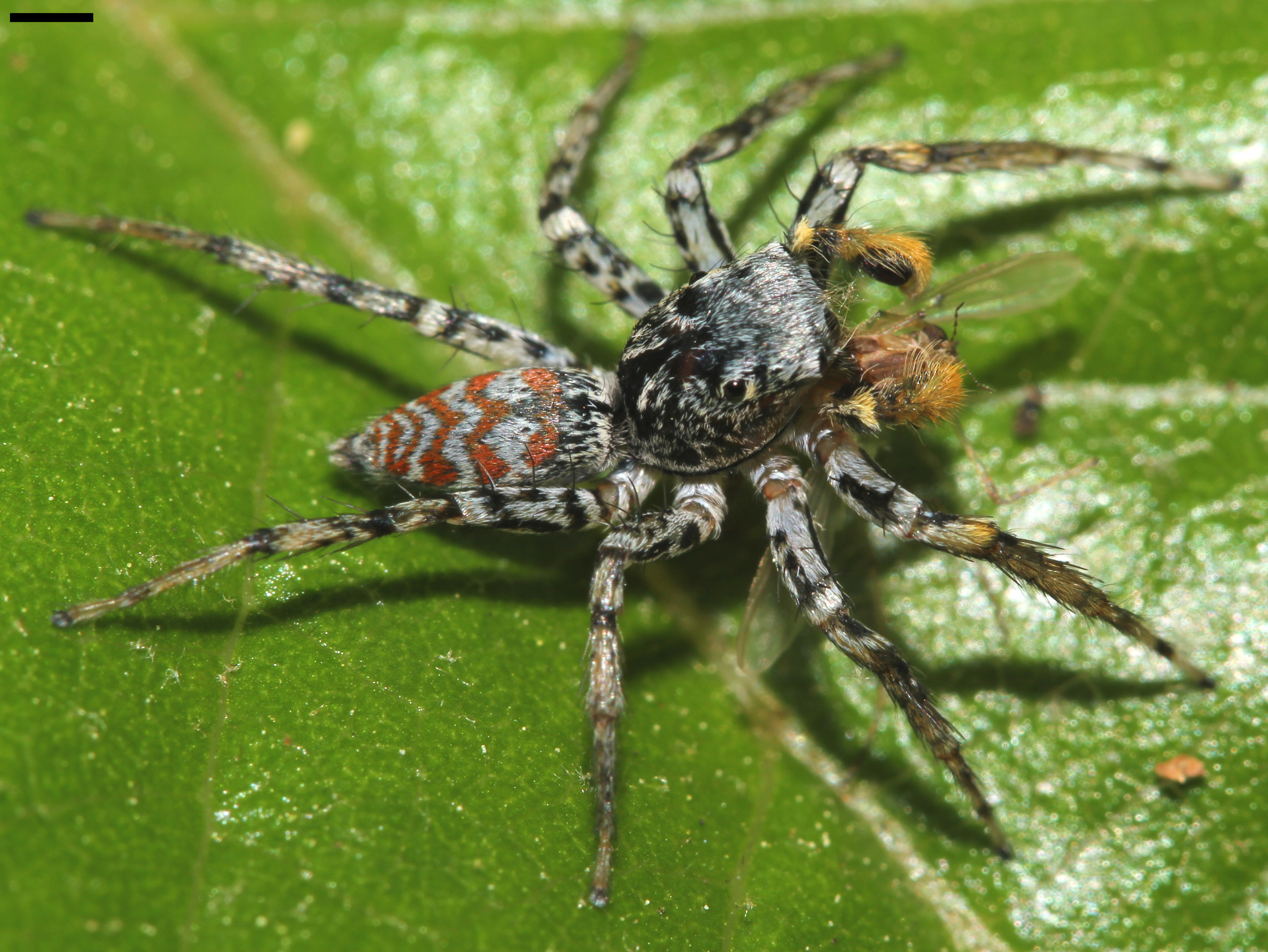
Male, grey morph

== Reproduction and lifecycle ==
Each morph accounts for 50% of the adult males, and they make the same number of attempts to court females, but using a different courting display. Before looking for a mate, a male spider spins a small, flat web on a surface and ejaculates into it. He then loads the semen into syringe-like receptacles in both palps, and then searches for a female.

After sighting a female, the tufted morph pushes himself as high as possible with the last three pair of legs, and claps with the foremost pair, while at the same time waving the palps up and down, and swinging its abdomen from side to side, usually about 9 centimetres (3.5 in) from the female. In contrast, the gray morph crouches down and points the foremost two pairs of legs directly forward, crosses the tips of the legs creating a triangle-like configuration, holds his orange-colored palps beneath his forward eyes, and glides back and forth in stationary or receding semi-circles in front of the female, at 3 centimetres (1.2 in) away. The movements of the two morphs are identical later in the sequence.

When receptive, females respond similarly to both male types: approach and settle; extend the foremost pair of legs or tap with them. Both male morphs typically end their initial display and start leg-clapping and zig-zag dancing.

When tufted males clap, females look towards them and display a greater number of tap displays to them than to the gray morph. Females also respond to tufted morphs' clapping more often by settling than for gray males. However, after the females look towards the males, gray males approach the female more often than the tufted male. Females often tip their abdomens from side to side.

Finally the male mounts and copulates with the female. Afterward, the male generally dismounts and the two pair usually run away from each other. However, the male sometimes chases the female and tries to copulate again.

In an experiment, 12 tufted (52%) and 14 gray males (54%) copulated with females after courtship. At the end of copulation, females tried to capture and eat the males, but in the same experiment only one tufted and one gray male were killed. A count of offspring showed no differences in numbers of spiderlings from the two morphs. However, gray males got females' attention more quickly within 8 centimetres (3.1 in) while tufted males were quicker between 8 and 30 centimetres (3.1 and 11.8 in) from the females. The continuation of two male morphs may be an example of a mixed evolutionarily stable strategy, in which both morphs are genetically determined by their fathers' morphs, and both are equally successful in their different ways.

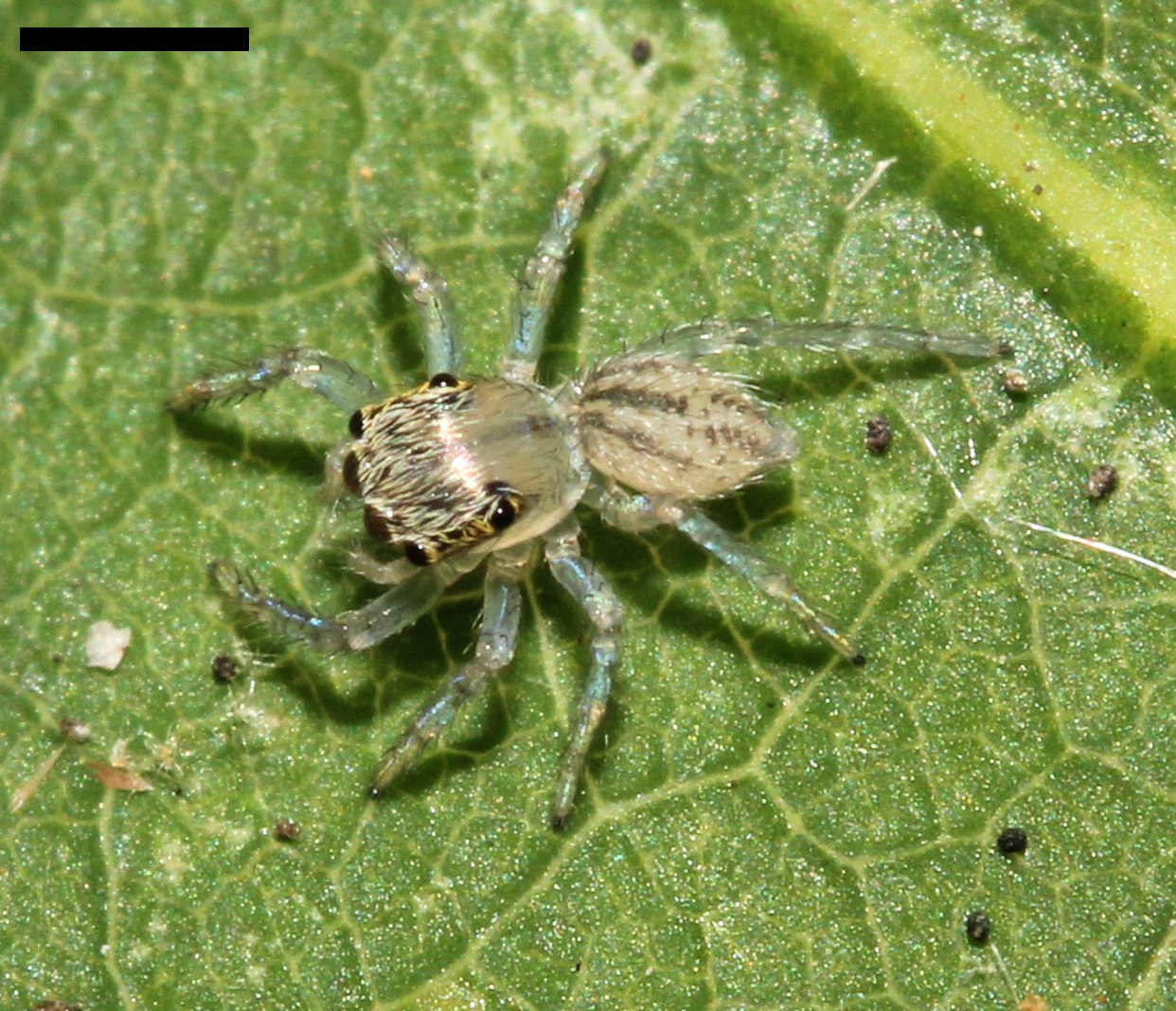
Second instar spiderling

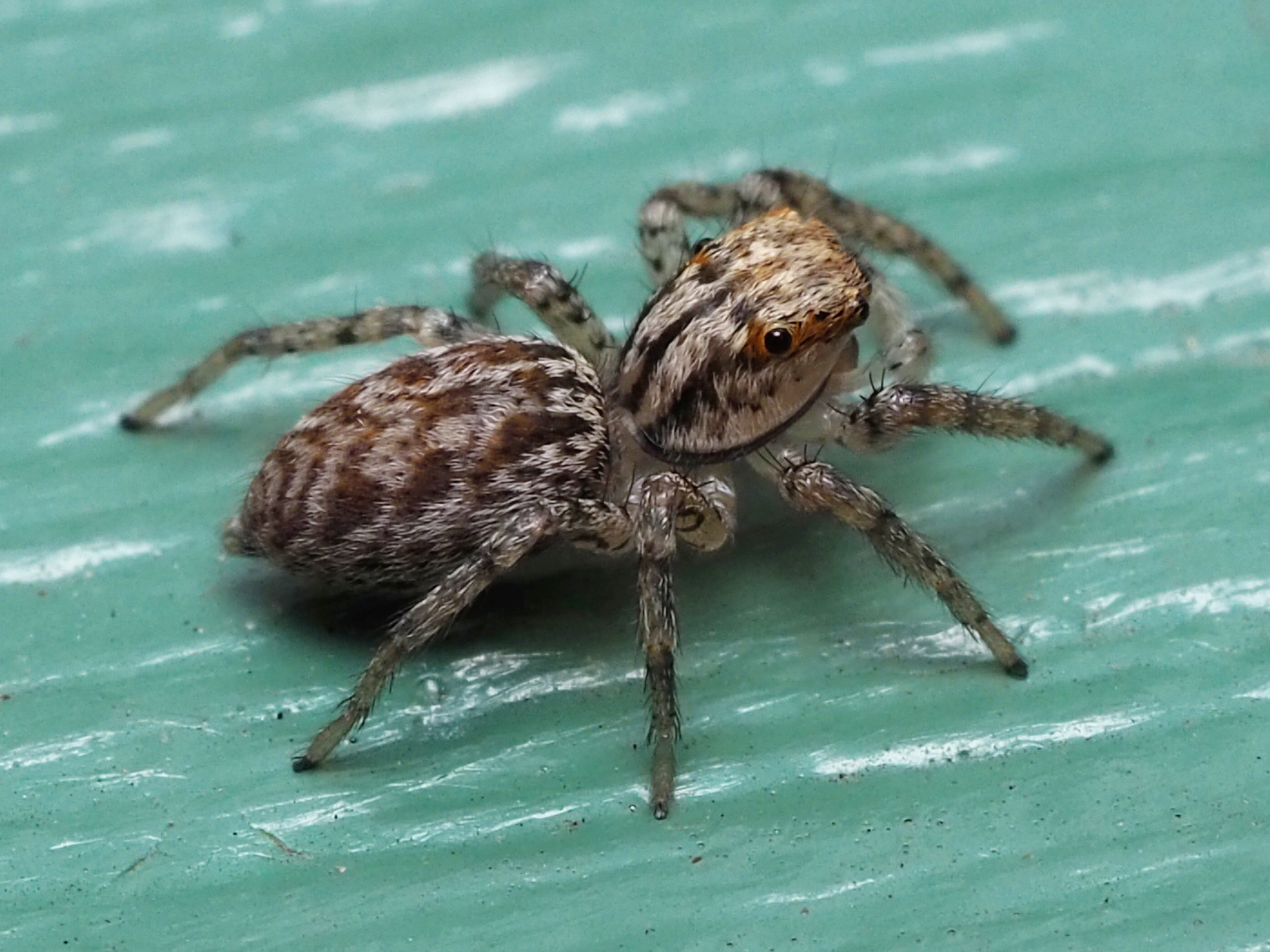
Immature male

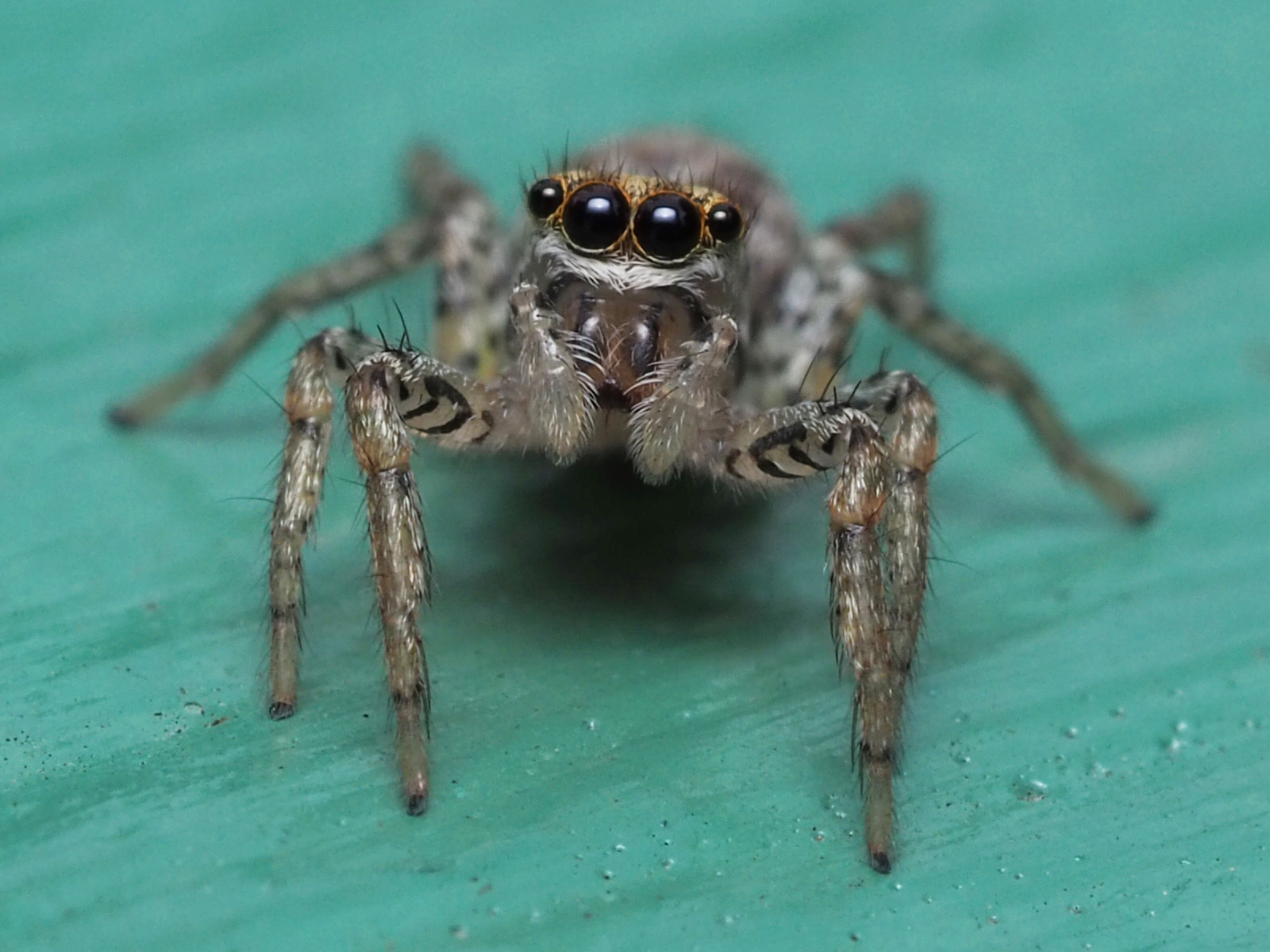
Immature male

== Distribution and habitat ==
Maevia inclemens is found throughout the eastern and mid-western United States and south-eastern Canada, including: Massachusetts, Connecticut, New York state, New Jersey, Pennsylvania, Maryland, West Virginia, Virginia, North Carolina, Florida, Alabama, Louisiana, Texas, Kansas, Kentucky, Indiana, Illinois, Michigan, Wisconsin, Quebec, Ontario, and Manitoba.

A study reported in 1981 on one mature and three recently clear-cut sites in the southern Appalachian Mountains near Highlands, North Carolina. All specimens of spiders that hunt were collected on plants or webs above ground. Clear-cutting caused a marked decrease in the abundance of nine species and a marked increase in four species, while M. inclemens and six others showed no change.

A few jumping spider species, including M. inclemens, have been able to establish themselves in man-made structures. Most often these spiders are found on outbuildings or structures such as fences, rather than in permanently inhabited houses.
