= Nannenus =

Scientific classification
- Kingdom: Animalia
- Phylum: Arthropoda
- Subphylum: Chelicerata
- Class: Arachnida
- Order: Araneae
- Infraorder: Araneomorphae
- Family: Salticidae
- Subfamily: Salticinae
- Genus: Nannenus; Simon, 1902

Type species
- N. syrphus Simon, 1902

Species
- 6, see text

Genus of spiders

Nannenus is a genus of Asian jumping spiders that was first described by Eugène Louis Simon in 1902.

== Description ==
Both sexes are about 4 millimetres (1/4 in) long. The cephalus is high, the eye region blackish with the area between the rear eyes lighter. The rest of the thorax is brown with a whitish lateral band on each side. The abdomen is small and light yellowish with a vague white pattern.

== Species ==
As of July 2019 it contains six species, found only in Asia:

- Nannenus constrictus (Karsch, 1880) – Philippines
- Nannenus lyriger Simon, 1902 – Singapore
- Nannenus maughami Prószyński & Deeleman-Reinhold, 2012 – Indonesia (Sumatra)
- Nannenus menghaiensis Cao & Li, 2016 – China
- Nannenus siedleckii Prószyński & Deeleman-Reinhold, 2012 – Indonesia (Sumatra)
- Nannenus syrphus Simon, 1902 (type) – Singapore
