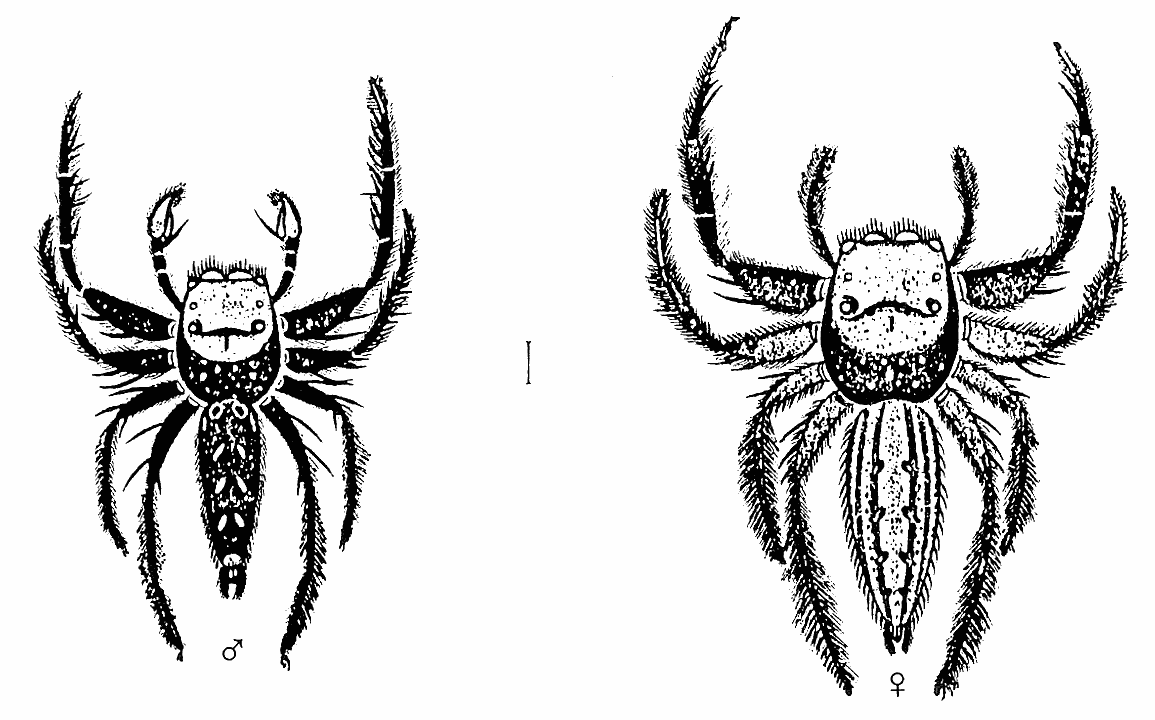
- B. sexpunctata male and female

Scientific classification
- Kingdom: Animalia
- Phylum: Arthropoda
- Subphylum: Chelicerata
- Class: Arachnida
- Order: Araneae
- Infraorder: Araneomorphae
- Family: Salticidae
- Subfamily: Salticinae
- Genus: Bavia; Simon, 1877

Type species
- Bavia aericeps Simon, 1877

Species
- See text.

= Bavia =

Genus of spiders

Bavia is a genus of jumping spiders.

== Description ==
Bavia species are around 6 to 11 millimetres (0.24 to 0.43 in) long in both sexes. Species of this genus are slender with long legs.

== Habits ==
Bavia is often found on the leaves of shrubs or lower tree branches.

== Distribution ==
Bavia is distributed throughout the Australasian region, with one isolated species found in Madagascar.

== Species ==
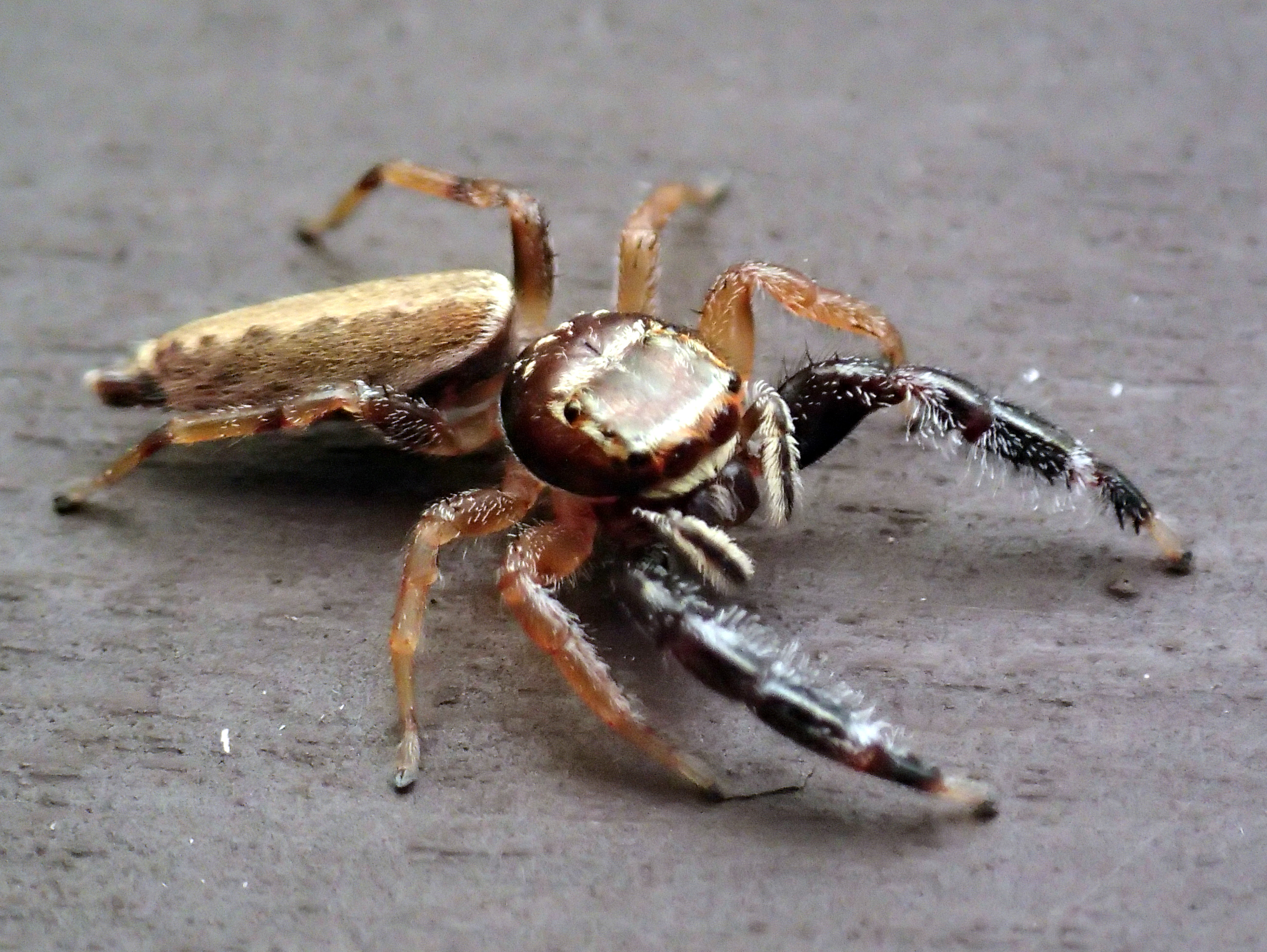
B. aericeps

B. capistrata

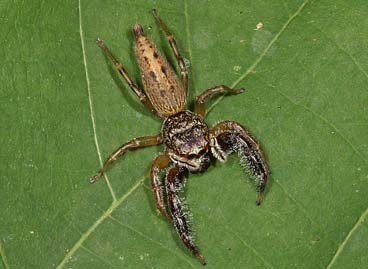
B. sexpunctata

As of January 2021, the World Spider Catalog accepted the following species:

- Bavia aericeps Simon, 1877 – Malaysia to Australia, Pacific Islands
- Bavia albolineata Peckham & Peckham, 1885 – Madagascar
- Bavia capistrata (C. L. Koch, 1846) – Malaysia
- Bavia decorata (Thorell, 1890) – Sumatra
- Bavia fedor Berry, Beatty & Prószyński, 1997 – Caroline Islands
- Bavia gabrieli Barrion, 2000 – Philippines
- Bavia hians (Thorell, 1890) – Sumatra
- Bavia intermedia (Karsch, 1880) – Philippines
- Bavia maurerae (Freudenschuss & Seiter, 2016)) – Philippines
- Bavia nessagyna Maddison, 2020 – Malaysia (Borneo)
- Bavia planiceps (Karsch, 1880) – Philippines
- Bavia sexpunctata (Doleschall, 1859) – Indonesia (Sumatra), Malaysia, Japan (Ryūkyū Islands) to Australia
- Bavia sinoamerica Lei & Peng, 2011 – China
- Bavia valida (Keyserling, 1882) – Queensland, Gilbert Islands

Bavia ludicra (Keyserling, 1882) was transferred to genus Sandalodes and synonymized with Sandalodes superbus in 2000.

The name "Bavia kairali" has been used for a species found in India, but the name was not recognized by the World Spider Catalog as of January 2021.
