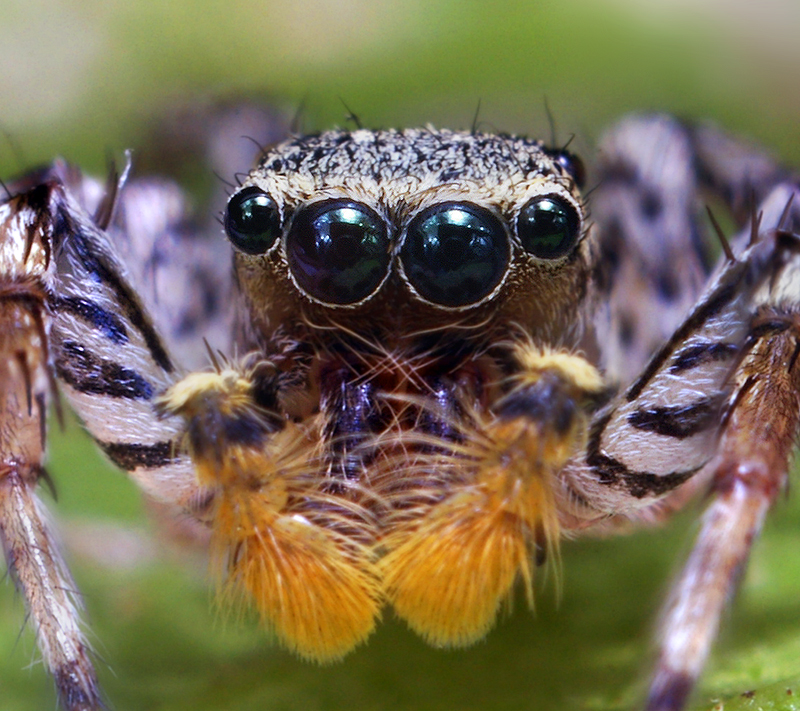
- Male Maevia inclemens

Scientific classification
- Kingdom: Animalia
- Phylum: Arthropoda
- Subphylum: Chelicerata
- Class: Arachnida
- Order: Araneae
- Infraorder: Araneomorphae
- Family: Salticidae
- Subfamily: Salticinae
- Genus: Maevia; C. L. Koch, 1846

Type species
- Attus inclemens Walckenaer, 1837

Species
- See text.

= Maevia =

Maevia Temporal range: Neogene–present

Genus of spiders

Maevia is a spider genus of the family Salticidae (jumping spiders).

Maevia appears to have been a large blanket genus in its beginnings, with not closely related species from the New World and the region from India to the Moluccas being lumped there. As the type species is from North America, those that occur in the New World were left in the genus, with most others transferred to other genera. However, several species exist in Asia for which there has been no information since their description, often more than a hundred years ago, so transferring them to other genera proves difficult.

== Species ==
- Maevia albozonata Hasselt, 1882 – Sumatra
- Maevia expansa Barnes, 1955 – United States
- Maevia gracilipes Taczanowski, 1878 – Peru
- Maevia inclemens (Walckenaer, 1837) – USA, Canada
- Maevia intermedia Barnes, 1955 – USA
- Maevia quadrilineata Hasselt, 1882 – Sumatra
- Maevia susiformis Taczanowski, 1878 – Peru
- Maevia trilineata Taczanowski, 1878 – Peru
