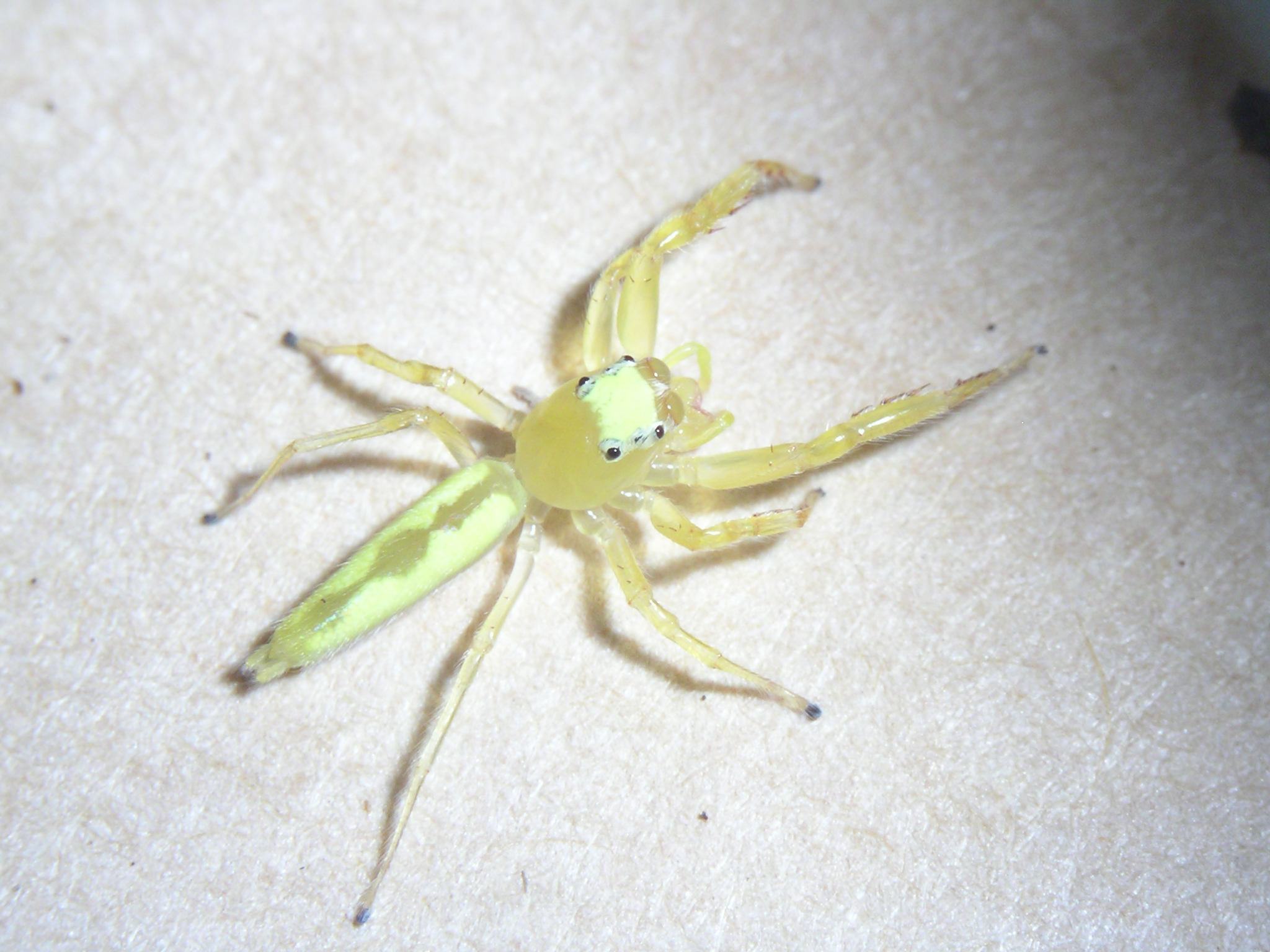
- Female Stagetillus sp. in Malaysia

Scientific classification
- Kingdom: Animalia
- Phylum: Arthropoda
- Subphylum: Chelicerata
- Class: Arachnida
- Order: Araneae
- Infraorder: Araneomorphae
- Family: Salticidae
- Subfamily: Salticinae
- Genus: Stagetillus; Simon, 1885
- Species: S. opaciceps

Binomial name
- Stagetillus opaciceps Simon, 1885

= Stagetillus =

Genus of spiders

Stagetillus is a monotypic genus of Southeast Asian jumping spiders containing the single species, Stagetillus opaciceps. It was first described by Eugène Louis Simon in 1885, and is found in Indonesia, Philippines and Malaysia.

Females are 6 mm (1/4 in) long, while males can grow up to 8 mm (1/3 in). The carapace is a shiny yellowish-red with two dark stripes on the sides. The very narrow, long abdomen is dark purplish with elongated white marks on the sides and a transverse white mark near the spinnerets. The legs are yellow, except for the very robust front pair, which is dark with yellow tarsi.
