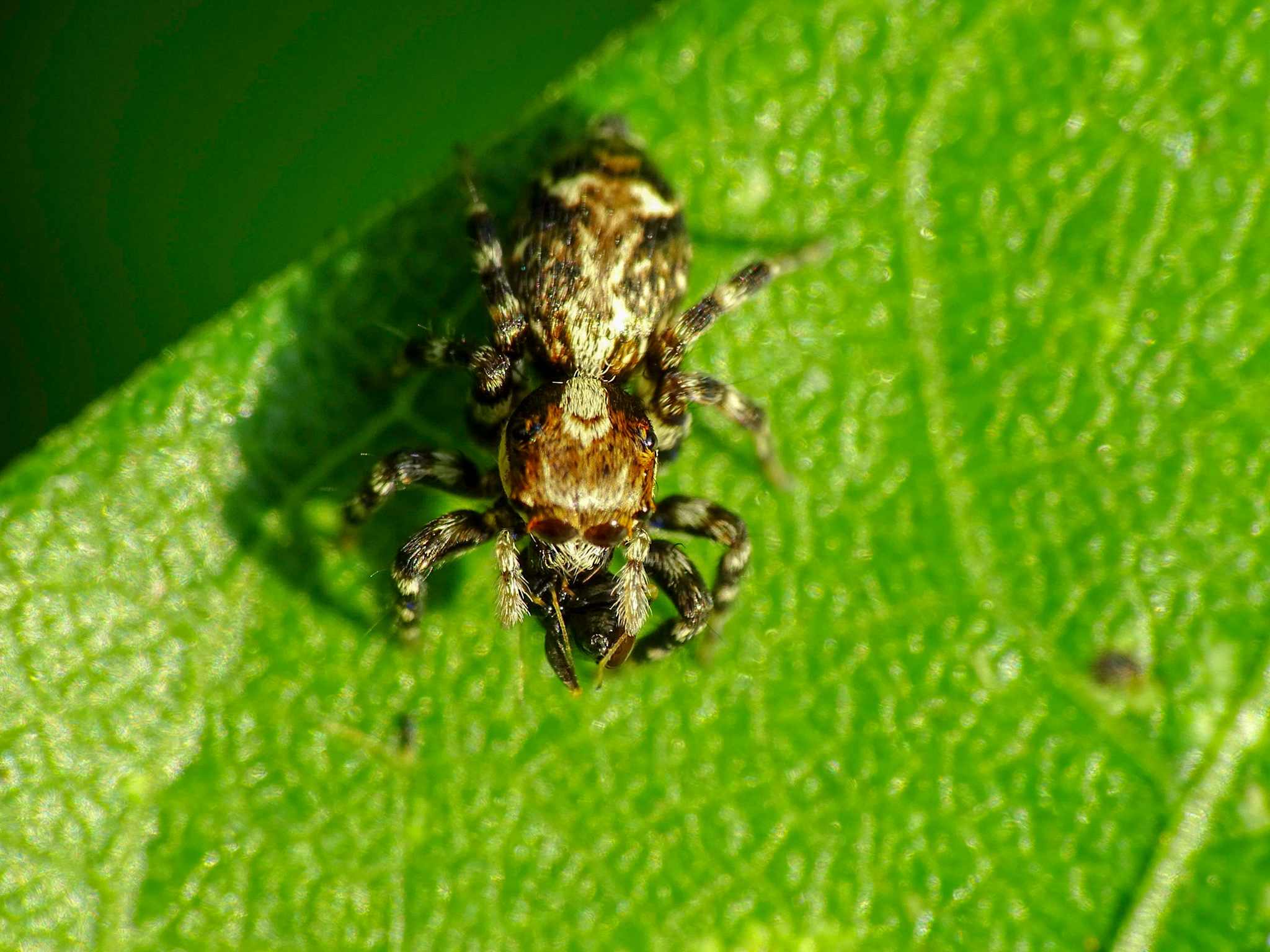
- A spider of the genus Plexippus

Scientific classification
- Kingdom: Animalia
- Phylum: Arthropoda
- Subphylum: Chelicerata
- Class: Arachnida
- Order: Araneae
- Infraorder: Araneomorphae
- Family: Salticidae
- Genus: Plexippus
- Species: P. baro

Binomial name
- Plexippus baro Wesołowska & Tomasiewicz, 2008

= Plexippus baro =

Species of spider

Plexippus baro is a species of jumping spider in the genus Plexippus that lives in Ethiopia. The male was first described by Wanda Wesołowska and Beata Tomasiewicz in 2008. The female has not been identified. The spider is medium-sized with a cephalothorax that is typically 2.7 mm (0.11 in) long and an abdomen 3.6 mm (0.14 in) long. The carapace is brown with three white stripes, and the abdomen is russet-brown with a single white stripe. The spider has a pattern of two narrow white stripes on its clypeus which gives it a distinctive face. The copulatory organs distinguish it from related species, particularly the male's longer embolus.

== Taxonomy ==
Plexippus baro is a jumping spider that was first described in 2010 by Wanda Wesołowska and Beata Tomasiewicz. It is one of over 500 species identified by the Polish arachnologist Wesołowska. It was placed in the genus Plexippus, first described by Carl Ludwig Koch in 1846. The word plexippus is Greek and can be translated striking or driving horses. It was the name of several heroes in Homer's Iliad. The genus was placed in the subtribe Plexippina in the tribe Plexippini, both named after the genus, by Wayne Maddison in 2015, who listed the tribe in the clade Saltafresia. It was allocated to the subclade Simonida, named in honour of the French arachnologist Eugène Simon. In 2016, it was combined with 31 other genera into the group Christillines, named after the genus Chrysilla. In his 2017 study of the genus, Jerzy Prószyński placed Plexippus baro within the 20 species in the genus that were recognisable as unique.

== Description ==
Plexippus baro has a general appearance that is typical of the species, with a body length of 5.9 mm (0.23 in). It is a medium-sized spider. The male has a cephalothorax that typically measures 2.7 mm (0.11 in) long and 2.1 mm (0.083 in) wide. The carapace is brown, is marked with three wide stripes made of white hairs and a dark narrow line along the edge. The eye field is darker and has a covering of grey hairs. The clypeus is also brown and has a distinctive pattern of two thin parallel lines of white scales. There are scales at the bottom of the chelicerae as well. The labium is brown. The abdomen is an elongated oval that is typically 3.6 mm (0.14 in) long and 1.7 mm (0.067 in) wide. It is russet-brown in colour with a long white stripe down the middle and light stripes on the edge. The underside is pale apart from three brown lines that stretch from the front to the back. The spinnerets have a yellow tint. The legs are brown with sparse white hairs. The pedipalps are also brown. The bottom part of the cymbium is covered in white hair. The embolus is long with a serrated bulge at the base. The tibia has an apophysis, or appendage, that is short and straight with a sharp tip. Only the male has been described.

The spider can be told from other species in the genus like Plexippus paykulli by its longer embolus and the stripy clypeus that makes a distinctive pattern on its face. It most closely resembles Plexippus auberti, but has a more bulbous, broader and longer embolus and narrower tibial apophysis.

== Distribution ==
Plexippus baro is endemic to Ethiopia. The holotype was found in Baro, in Illubabor Province near Gambela in 1985, which is recalled in the species name.
