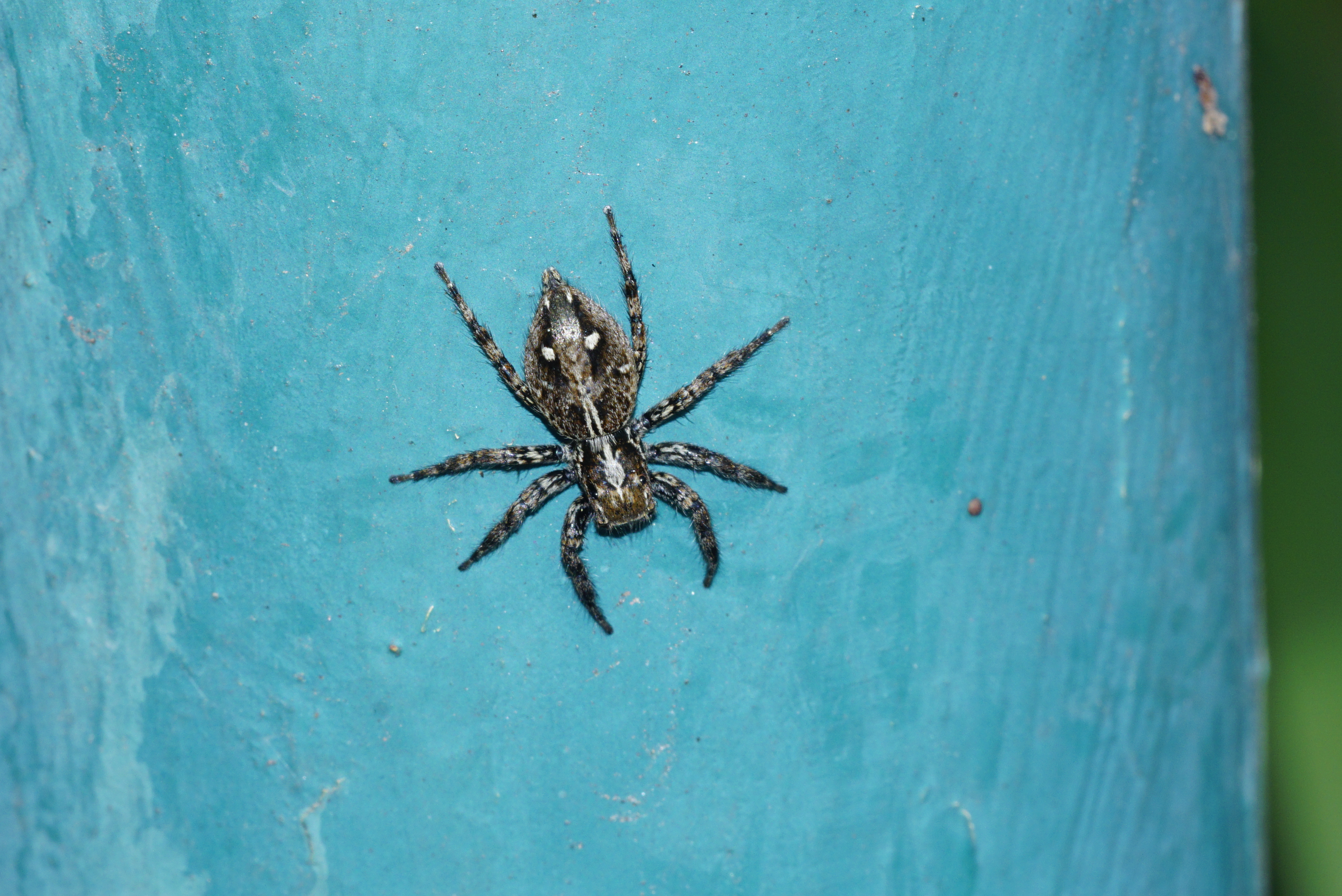
- A female of the related species Plexippus paykulli

Scientific classification
- Kingdom: Animalia
- Phylum: Arthropoda
- Subphylum: Chelicerata
- Class: Arachnida
- Order: Araneae
- Infraorder: Araneomorphae
- Family: Salticidae
- Genus: Plexippus
- Species: P. fuscus

Binomial name
- Plexippus fuscus Rollard & Wesołowska, 2002

= Plexippus fuscus =

Species of spider

Plexippus fuscus is a species of jumping spider in the genus Plexippus that lives in Guinea. It was first described in 2002 by Christine Rollard and Wanda Wesołowska. Only the female has been described. It is a medium-sized spider, with a dark brown carapace typically 3.4 mm (0.13 in) long and a reddish-brown abdomen that is 2.3 mm (0.091 in) long. Both the carapace and abdomen are covered in dark brown hairs. The abdomen has a yellow marking like a belt. Although superficially similar to other species in the genus like Plexippus paykulli, it can be distinguished by the presence of a long thin pocket in the epigyne and significant sclerotisation on the edges of the copulatory openings, which are also wider than other Plexippus spiders.

== Taxonomy ==
Plexippus fuscus is a jumping spider that was first described by Christine Rollard and Wanda Wesołowska in 2002. It was placed in the genus Plexippus, first raised by Carl Ludwig Koch in 1846. The word plexippus is Greek and can be translated striking or driving horses. It was the name of a number of heroes in Homer's Iliad. The species name is derived from a Latin word that can be translated dark, recalling the generally dark colours on the spider. The genus was placed in the subtribe Plexippina in the tribe Plexippini, both named after the genus, by Wayne Maddison in 2015, who listed the tribe in the clade Saltafresia. It was allocated to the subclade Simonida, named in honour of the French arachnologist Eugène Simon. In 2016, it was combined with 31 other genera into the group Christillines, named after the genus Chrysilla. In his 2017 study of the genus, Jerzy Prószyński placed it within the 20 species that were recognisable as unique.

== Description ==
Plexippus fuscus is a medium-sized spider, with a carapace that measures typically 3.4 mm (0.13 in) in length and 2.3 mm (0.091 in) in width, while the abdomen is typically 4 mm (0.16 in) long and 2.4 mm (0.094 in) wide. The carapace is dark brown with a black area near the eyes and a lighter area, tending towards more of an orange colour, in the middle of the thorax. It is relatively flat in shape and has a covering of dense brown hairs. The clypeus is brown and low, while the chelicerae are darker brown, with two teeth visible on the front and a single tooth to the back. The labium is also brown. The elongated abdomen is a more red-brown, also with dense brown hairs, but has a yellow belt-like marking. The underside is greyish-yellow. The spinnerets are yellow. The spider has hairy legs, the front ones being brown but the rest predominantly orange. The spider has a large and elongated epigyne with a central pocket and two very narrow gonopores. The is highly sclerotised, as are the wide entrances to the seminal ducts. This particularly long and thin pocket, its location in the middle of the epigyne, and the wide sclerotised edges of copulatory openings help the distinguish the species from others in the genus, like Plexippus paykulli, as superficially it is very similar. Only the female has been described.

== Distribution and habitat ==
The female holotype was collected in Mount LeClerc in the Guinea Highlands in 1991, at an altitude of 1,250 m (4,100 ft) above sea level. The species is ground-dwelling and has been found living in low vegetation.
