= Plexippus clemens =

Scientific classification
- Kingdom: Animalia
- Phylum: Arthropoda
- Subphylum: Chelicerata
- Class: Arachnida
- Order: Araneae
- Infraorder: Araneomorphae
- Family: Salticidae
- Genus: Plexippus
- Species: P. clemens

Binomial name
- Plexippus clemens (O. Pickard-Cambridge, 1872)

Species of jumping spider

Plexippus clemens is a species of jumping spider in the genus Plexippus that has a wide species distribution and has been found in countries around the Mediterranean Sea and across Asia as far as China. The spider is small between 3.46 and 5.2 mm (0.136 and 0.205 in) in total length, the female being larger than the male. The female is generally yellow, with a black eye field and yellow-brown stripes and chevrons marking its abdomen. The male is darker, generally blackish-brown on top with a broad yellowish-white line down the back of its abdomen. The male has thick hairs on its clypeus. The spider's copulatory organs are similar in general layout to other spiders in the genus, particularly the internal structure of the female. The epigyne has a depression towards the front and slits that contain the copulatory openings. The male has a relatively short and thick embolus.

== Taxonomy ==
Plexippus clemens is a species of jumping spider, a member of the family Salticidae, that was first described in 1872 by Octavius Pickard-Cambridge. Initially, he placed the species in the genus Salticus. The species was transferred into the genus Euophrys by Eugène Simon in 1876. The genus, Euophrys was first described by Carl Ludwig Koch in 1834. The name derives from two Greek words, meaning good and eyelids. The species was moved toMenemerus by Jerzy Prószyński in 1984. The genus was first described in 1868 by Eugène Simon and contains over 60 species. Eventually the species was moved to its current position, in Plexippus, by Prószyński in 2003. Specimen of the species have also been labelled Attus clemens, but this name was never adopted.

Plexippus was first circumscribed by Carl Ludwig Koch in 1846. The word plexippus is Greek and can be translated striking or driving horses. It was the name of a number of heroes in Homer's Iliad. The genus was placed in the subtribe Plexippina in the tribe Plexippini, both named after the genus, by Wayne Maddison in 2015, who listed the tribe in the clade Saltafresia. It was allocated to the subclade Simonida, named in honour of the French arachnologist Eugène Simon. In 2016, it was combined with 31 other genera into the group Christillines, named after the genus Chrysilla. In his 2017 study of the genus, Jerzy Prószyński placed Plexippus clemens within the 20 species that were recognisable as unique.

== Synonyms ==
Synonyms for the species include:

- Euophrys clemens Simon, 1876
- Menemerus clemens Prószyński, 1984
- Plexippus bhutani Zabka, 1990
- Plexippus similis Wesołowska & van Harten, 1994
- Plexippus tectonicus Prószyński, 2003
- Plexippus yinae Peng & Li, 2003
- Salticus clemens O. Pickard-Cambridge, 1872

The position of Plexippus similis and Plexippus tectonicus have been subject to controversy, with Prószyński removing them from synonymity in 2017. However, their status as synonyms was reaffirmed by Dhruv Prajapati, Ketan Tatu and R. D. Kamboj in 2021.

== Description ==
Plexippus clemens is a small spider, The female has a typical total length of 5.2 mm (0.20 in). It has a carapace, the hard upper shell of the forward section of the spider, that measures between 2.5 and 2.7 mm (0.098 and 0.106 in) in length and between 1.0 and 2 mm (0.039 and 0.079 in) in width and an abdomen, or section behind the carapace, between 2.3 and 2.9 mm (0.091 and 0.114 in) in length and between 1.3 and 1.9 mm (0.051 and 0.075 in) in width. Its carapace is yellow with a black eye field. Its sternum, or underside of the forward section, is yellow. It mouthparts, including its labium and maxillae, are also yellow. Its chelicerae are rounded. The abdomen is dull yellow with yellow-brown stripes, a pale central band and a series of yellow-brown chevrons to the rear. It has yellow legs that have more spines than the related Plexippus devorans.

The spider's copulatory organs show its relationship with other Plexippus spiders, particularly the general plan of its internal features. However, they are unique to the species in detail. Its epigyne, the external and most visible of its copulatory organs, has a distinctive circular depression towards the front, behind which runs a furrow down the middle of the organ. The two copulatory openings lie in diagonal slits. They lead, via unusually short insemination ducts, to spherical oval spermathecae, or receptacles.

The species shows a degree of sexual dimorphism as the male is smaller than the female, typically 3.46 mm (0.136 in) long. It has blackish-brown shield-like carapace that measures typically 2 mm (0.079 in) in length and 1.48 mm (0.058 in) in width. It has whitish hairs along its sides and a small diamond patch between its eyes. There are several thick hairs on its clypeus and white hairs on its brownish chelicerae. The spider has a single tooth to the back and two to the front. Its oval abdomen is typically 1.46 mm (0.057 in) long and 0.92 mm (0.036 in) wide. It is blackish brown and marked with a broad yellowish-white band that runs down the middle from front to back. Its legs are yellowish-brown with dark brown patches.

The male's copulatory organs are unusual. Its pedipalps are brownish with black marks. There are hairs on the palpal tibia and cymbium. The palpal bulb has a distinctive rounded bulge opposite the cymbium and a large projection, or apophysis, that projects along its side. The embolus is relatively short and thick, with a broad base and a narrower tip, and curves along the line of the top of the bulb.

== Distribution ==
Plexippus clemens lives in many countries around the Mediterranean Sea and across Asia. It has been found in Algeria, China, Egypt, India, Iran, Israel, Libya, Pakistan, Turkey and Yemen.. The holotype was collected from the plains around the River Jordan. It lives in desert environments. The species was first seen in Turkey in 2011 amongst the mountains of the Balışeyh District in Kırıkkale Province.
