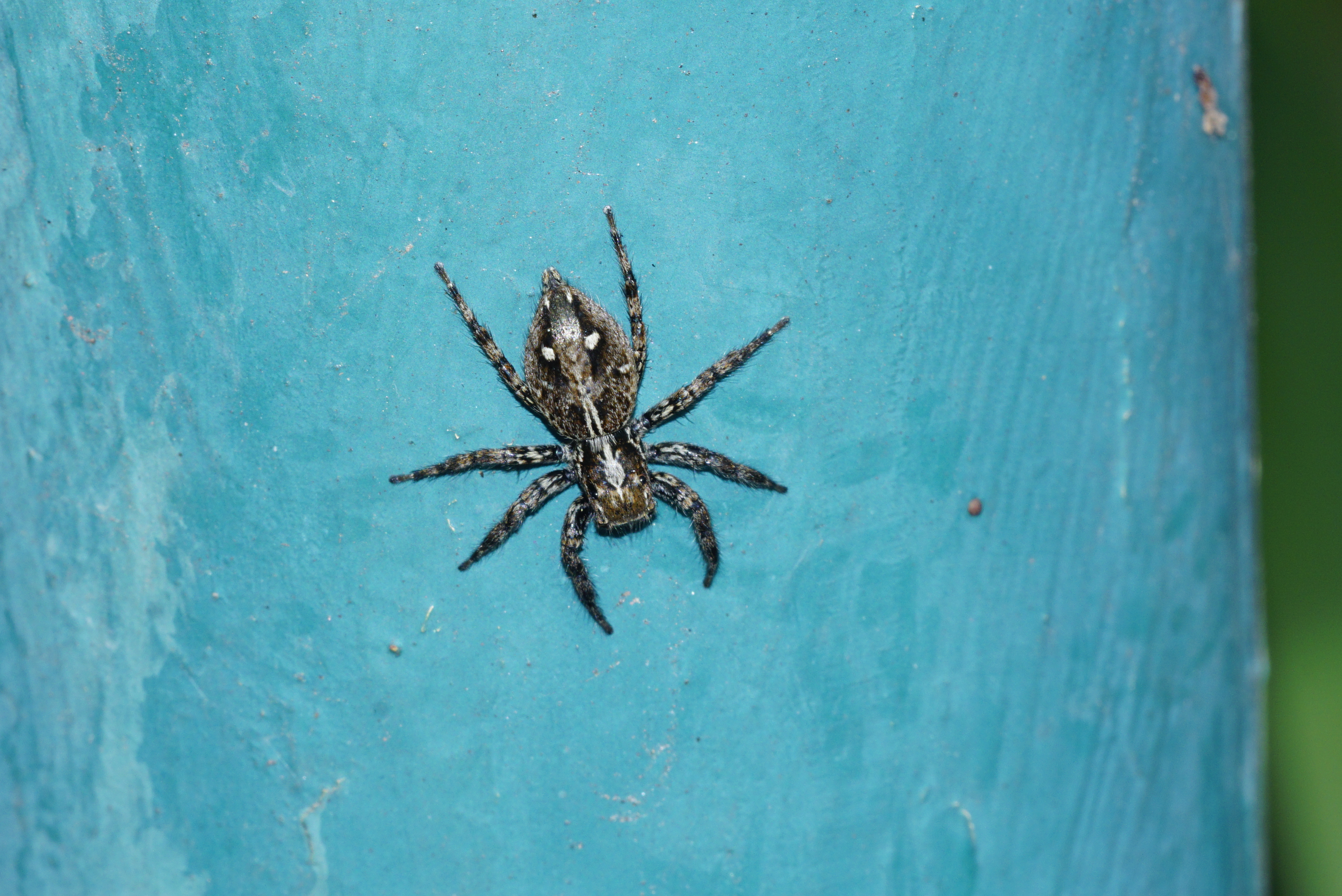
- A female of the related species Plexippus paykulli

Scientific classification
- Kingdom: Animalia
- Phylum: Arthropoda
- Subphylum: Chelicerata
- Class: Arachnida
- Order: Araneae
- Infraorder: Araneomorphae
- Family: Salticidae
- Genus: Plexippus
- Species: P. wesolowskae

Binomial name
- Plexippus wesolowskae Biswas & Raychaudhuri, 1998

= Plexippus wesolowskae =

Species of spider

Plexippus wesolowskae is a species of jumping spider in the genus Plexippus that lives in Bangladesh. It was first described in 1998 by V. Biswas and D. Raychaudhuri. The spider is medium-sized, with a carapace 3.4 mm (0.13 in) and an abdomen 3.2 mm (0.13 in) long. The carapace is dark brown with a black band and white cross. The abdomen is a lighter brown with one white and two black stripes. It is similar to the related Plexippus paykulli that can also be found in the same country, but can be distinguished by features like the elongated almost vase-like shape of the sternum and lack of tibial apophysis on the palpal bulb.

== Taxonomy ==
Plexippus wesolowskae was first described by V. Biswas and D. Raychaudhuri in 1998. It was placed in the genus Plexippus, first raised by Carl Ludwig Koch in 1846. The word plexippus is Greek and can be translated striking or driving horses. It was the name of a number of heroes in Homer's Iliad. The species is named for the Polish arachnologist Wanda Wesołowska. The genus was placed in the subtribe Plexippina in the tribe Plexippini, both named after the genus, by Wayne Maddison in 2015, who listed the tribe in the clade Saltafresia. It was allocated to the subclade Simonida, named in honour of the French arachnologist Eugène Simon. The place of Plexippus wesolowskae within the genus is uncertain and, in 2017, Jerzy Prószyński placed it in a list of 20 unrecognisable Plexippus species.

== Description ==
Only the male has been identified. The spider is medium-sized, with a total body length of 6.8 mm (0.27 in). It has a dark brown carapace that measures 3.4 mm (0.13 in) in length and 2.5 mm (0.098 in) in width. It is broad, particularly towards the middle, and has a pattern consisting of a black band and a white cross towards the back. The abdomen is a brown elongated oval, 3.2 mm (0.13 in) long and 2.2 mm (0.087 in) wide, with three stripes, one white and two black. The chelicerae are long with two teeth visible. The legs are brown and robust. The palpal bulb has no tibial apophysis, which is different to the similar and related Plexippus paykulli. Other distinguishing features are that the middle row of eyes are closer to the forward row and the elongated almost vase-like shape of the sternum.

== Distribution ==
The species is endemic to Bangladesh. The holotype was collected near Khulna in 1992. It was one of only two species of the genus, the other being Plexippus paykulli, to be identified in the country, listed at the same time and by the same authors.
