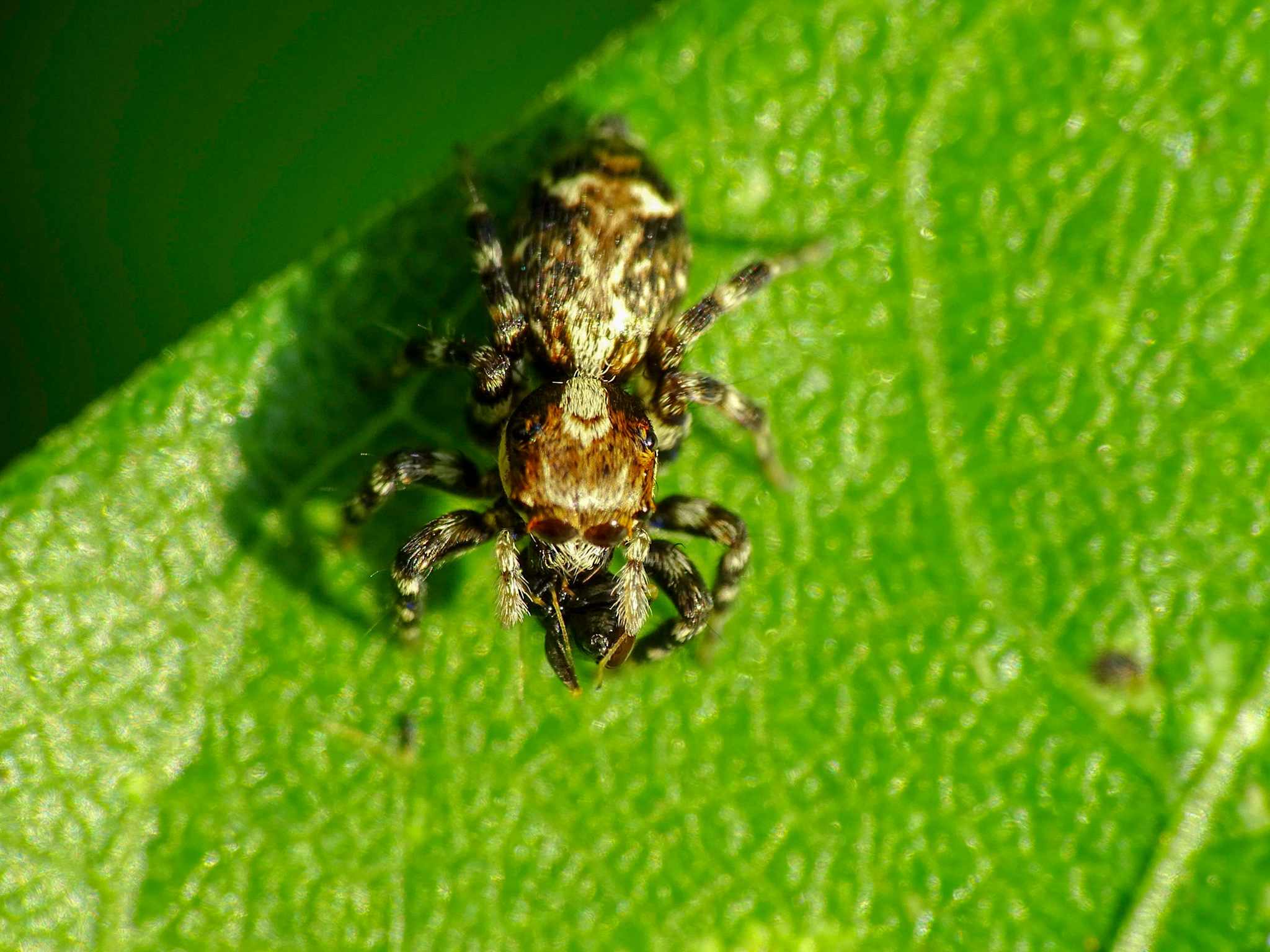
- A spider of the genus Plexippus

Scientific classification
- Kingdom: Animalia
- Phylum: Arthropoda
- Subphylum: Chelicerata
- Class: Arachnida
- Order: Araneae
- Infraorder: Araneomorphae
- Family: Salticidae
- Genus: Plexippus
- Species: P. fibulatus

Binomial name
- Plexippus fibulatus Dawidowicz & Wesołowska, 2016

= Plexippus fibulatus =

Species of spider

Plexippus fibulatus is a species of jumping spider in the genus Plexippus that lives in Kenya. It was first described in 2016 by Angelika Dawidowicz and Wanda Wesołowska. Only the male has been described. In 2017, Jerzy Prószyński suggested that it should be reclassified in its own genus as it does not resemble other Plexippus spiders but this has not been carried out. It is a medium-sized spider, with a cephalothorax between 2.9 and 3.3 mm (0.11 and 0.13 in) long and an abdomen between 2.9 and 3.3 mm (0.11 and 0.13 in) long. The dark brown carapace is marked with streaks made of white hairs and the brown abdomen has a pattern consisting of a white streak and chevrons. The spider has a short fleshy embolus and a spike-like tibial apophysis, after which is named, that is set perpendicular to the tibia.

== Taxonomy ==
Plexippus fibulatus is a jumping spider was first described by Angelika Dawidowicz and Wanda Wesołowska in 2016. The species was placed in the genus Plexippus, first raised by Carl Ludwig Koch in 1846. The word plexippus is Greek and can be translated striking or driving horses. It was the name of a number of heroes in Homer's Iliad. The species name is derived from a Latin word that can be translated spike, recalling the shape of the tibial apophysis. The genus was placed in the subtribe Plexippina in the tribe Plexippini, both named after the genus, by Wayne Maddison in 2015, who listed the tribe in the clade Saltafresia. It was allocated to the subclade Simonida, named in honour of the French arachnologist Eugène Simon. In 2016, it was combined with 31 other genera into the group Christillines, named after the genus Chrysilla. In his 2017 study of the genus, Jerzy Prószyński found that the species did not resemble other Plexippus spiders and therefore it should be placed in its own genus. This was not undertaken, so the species remained in the genus.

== Description ==
Plexippus fibulatus is a medium-sized spider, with a cephalothorax that measures between 2.9 and 3.3 mm (0.11 and 0.13 in) in length and between 2.5 and 2.6 mm (0.098 and 0.102 in) in width. The carapace is dark brown and moderately high. It is covered in brown hairs, apart from a set of wide streaks made of white hairs. The eye field is slightly darker. The clypeus is dark brown and covered with transparent hairs. The labium is also brown. The dark brown abdomen is between 2.9 and 3.3 mm (0.11 and 0.13 in) long and between 2 and 2.1 mm (0.079 and 0.083 in) wide. It has the shape of an elongated oval and is marked with a pattern consisting of a light-coloured streak and chevrons. The hairs that cover it match the underlying colour. The underside is dark with stripes on the edges. The spinnerets are light brown. The legs and pedipalps are also brown and hairy, but the hairs are white and brown. the embolus is short and the tibial apophysis, or appendage, is thin and resembles a spike, as is recalled in the species name. Only the male has been described.

Plexippus fibulatus can be clearly distinguished from other spiders in the genus. The species does not resemble other Plexippus spiders in the colours or shape of its body species, particularly its proportions. It has a fleshy embolus, with only the tip sclerotised and the tibial apophysis is bent and set perpendicular to the tibia, as well as resembling a spike. It also lacks the serrated keel that other Plexippus spiders have on their palpal bulbs.

== Distribution ==
Plexippus fibulatus is endemic to Kenya, The male holotype was identified near Mount Elgon and the Turkwel River. It is known only from that area of the country. The examples that have been identified are in a collection owned by the Swedish arachnologist Åke Holm and are held at Uppsala University.
