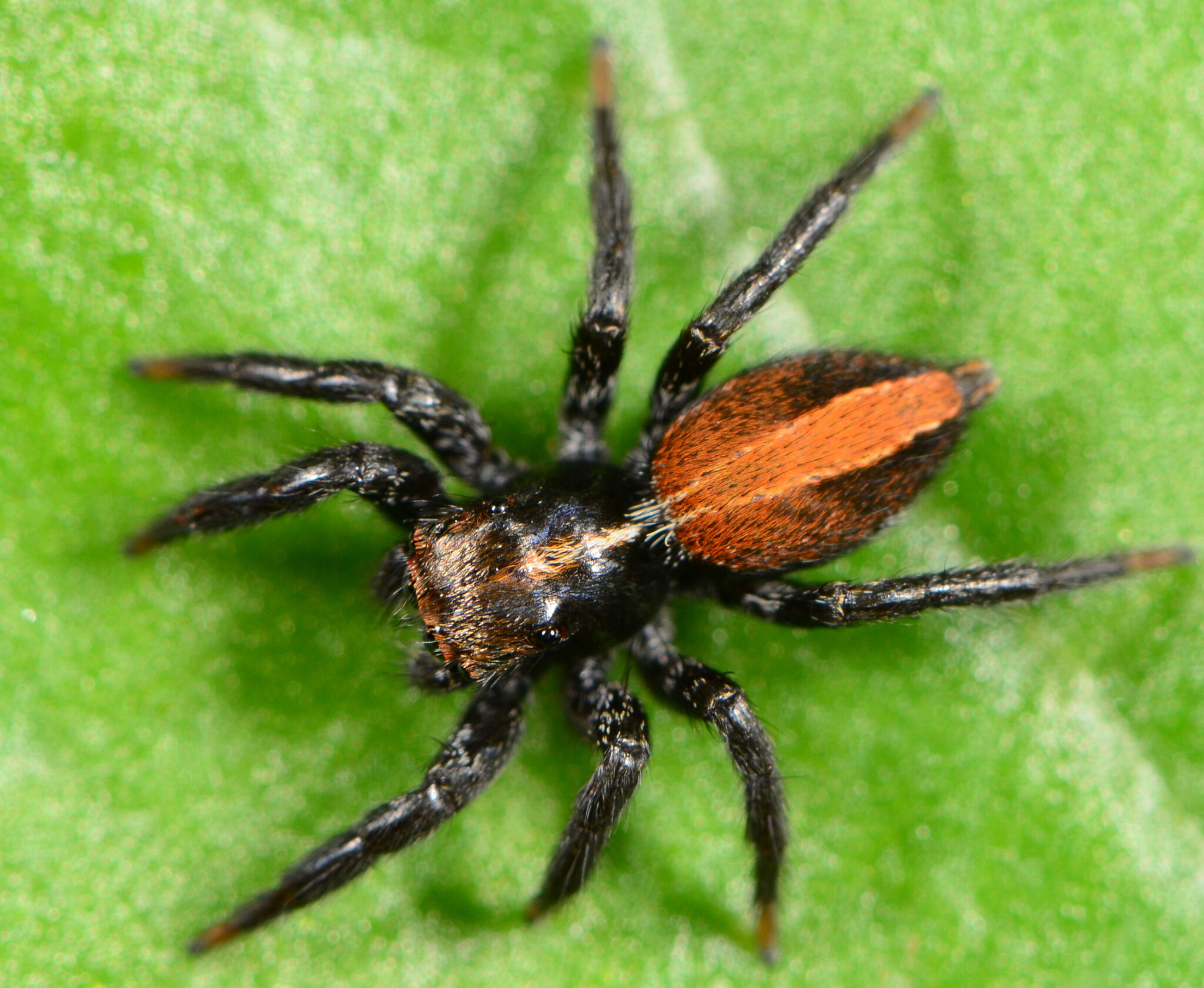
- female
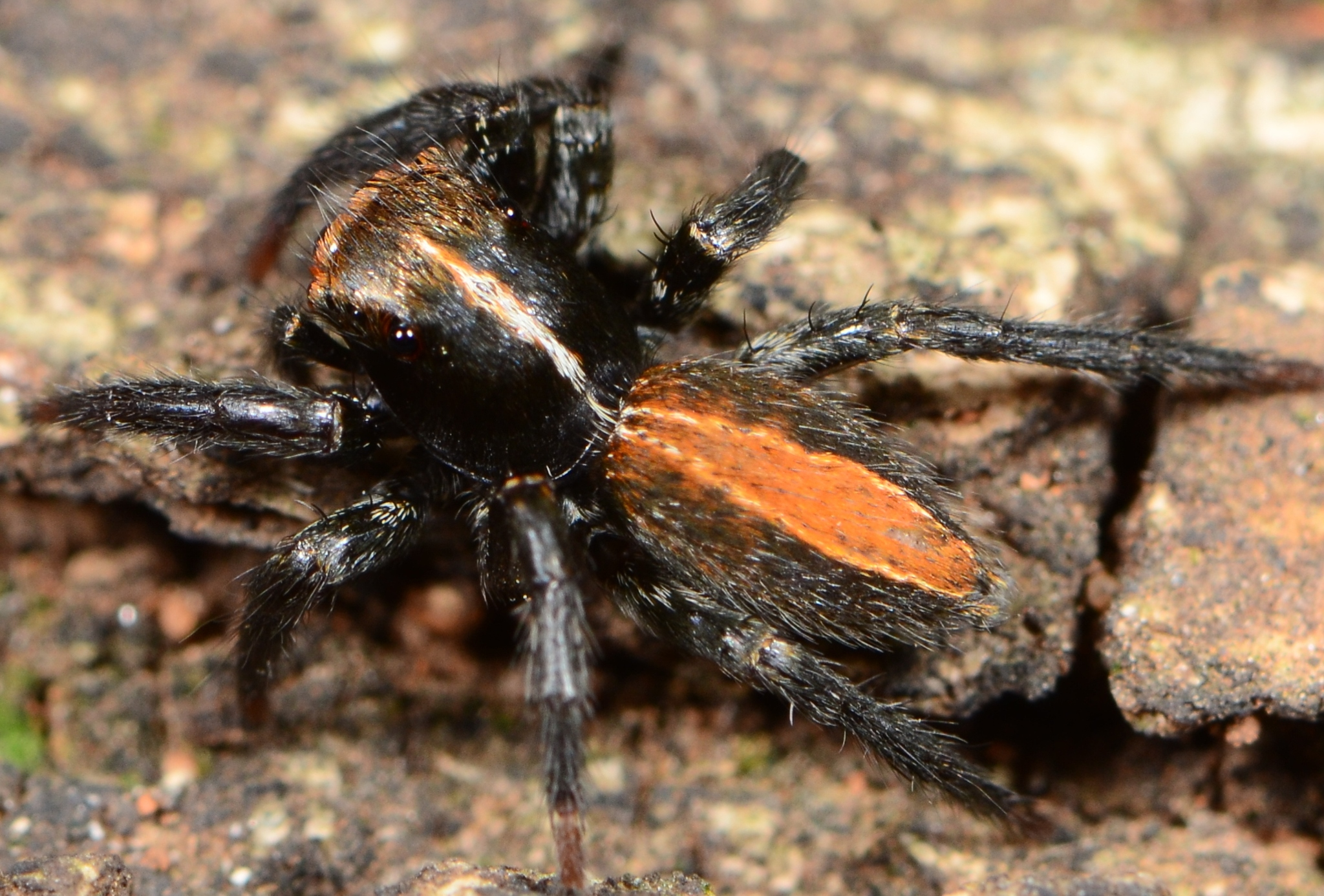
- male

Scientific classification
- Kingdom: Animalia
- Phylum: Arthropoda
- Subphylum: Chelicerata
- Class: Arachnida
- Order: Araneae
- Infraorder: Araneomorphae
- Family: Salticidae
- Genus: Plexippus
- Species: P. tsholotsho

Binomial name
- Plexippus tsholotsho Wesołowska, 2011

= Plexippus tsholotsho =

Species of spider

Plexippus tsholotsho is a species of jumping spider in the genus Plexippus that lives in South Africa and Zimbabwe. It was first described in 2011 by the Polish arachnologist Wanda Wesołowska. The species was first found in the Zimbabwean district of Tsholotsho, after which the species is named. Only the female has been described. It is a large spider, with a cephalothorax 4 mm (0.16 in) long and abdomen 5.2 mm (0.20 in) long. It is generally dark brown in colour, with a lighter brownish orange tint to the rear of the carapace and a white stripe along the body of the abdomen. It is distinguished from the otherwise similar Plexippus paykulli in the shape of the copulatory ducts in the epigyne and the presence of significant sclerotization around the gonopores.

== Taxonomy ==
Plexippus tsholotsho is a species of jumping spider that was first described by Wanda Wesołowska in 2011. It is one of over 500 species identified by the Polish arachnologist. It was placed in the genus Plexippus, first raised by Carl Ludwig Koch in 1846. The word plexippus is Greek and can be translated striking or driving horses. It was the name of a number of heroes in Homer's Iliad. The species is named for the area in which it was first discovered, Tsholotsho. The genus was placed in the subtribe Plexippina in the tribe Plexippini, both named after the genus, by Wayne Maddison in 2015, who listed the tribe in the clade Saltafresia. It was allocated to the subclade Simonida, named in honour of the French arachnologist Eugène Simon. In his 2017 study of the genus, Jerzy Prószyński stated that the placement of the species within the genus was uncertain. Nonetheless, he placed it within the 20 species that were recognisable as unique.

== Description ==
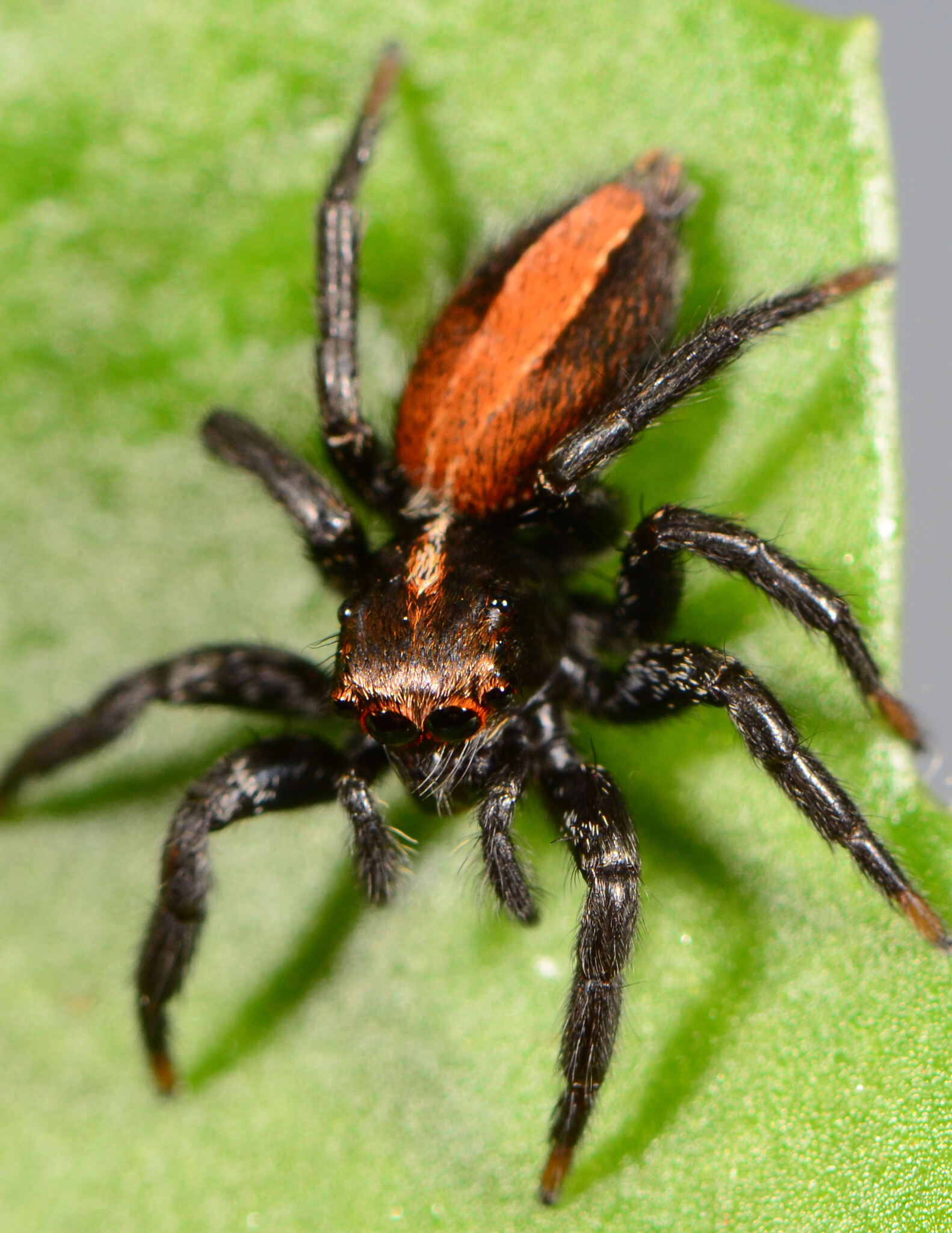
female

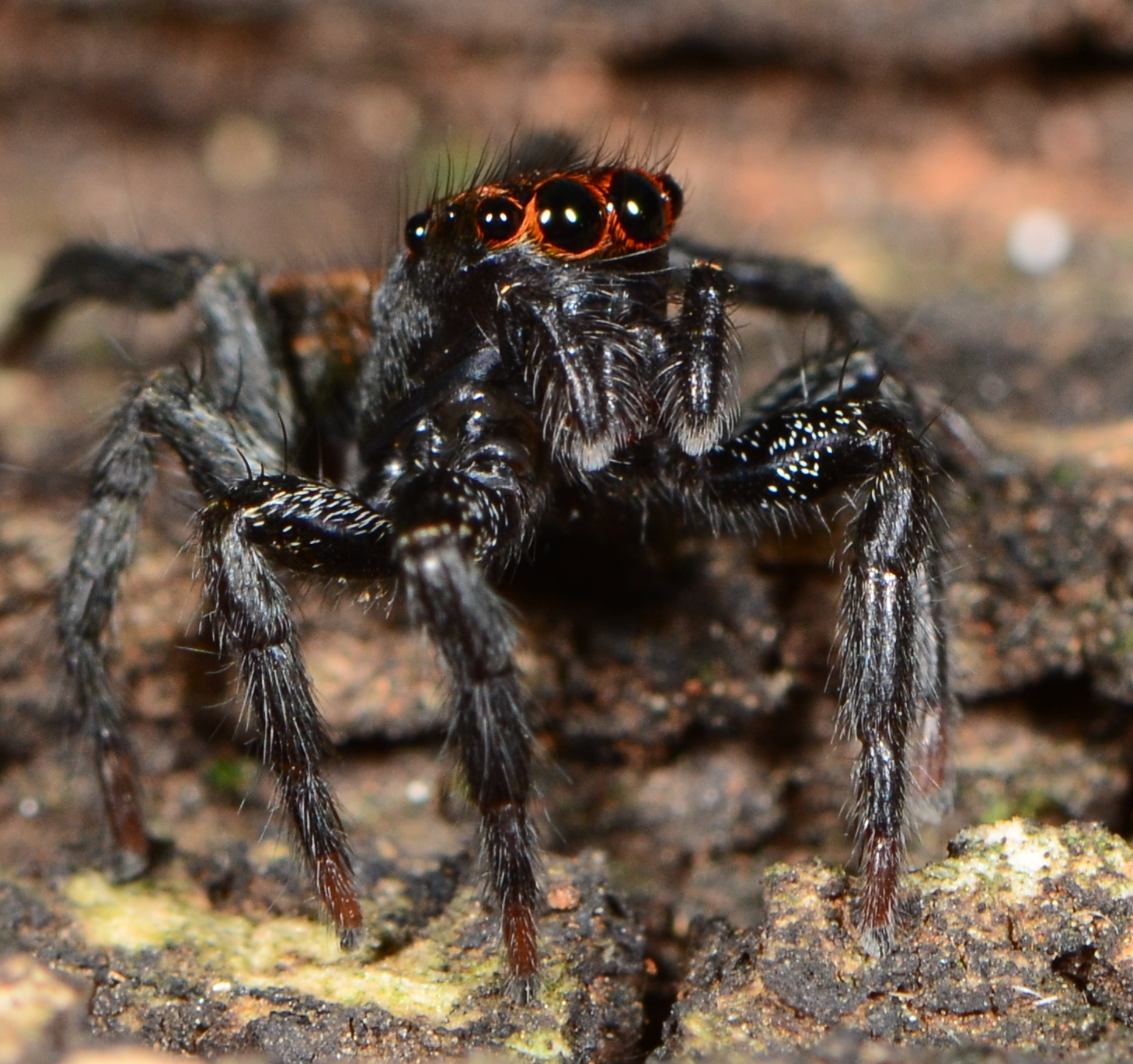
male

Plexippus tsholotsho is a large spider. The cephalothorax measures typically 4 mm (0.16 in) in length and 3.1 mm (0.12 in) in width, while the abdomen is typically 5.2 mm (0.20 in) long and 3.7 mm (0.15 in) wide. It has a dark brown oval carapace, covered in brown hairs, which is darker towards the front and lighter, a brownish orange, at the back. The ovoid abdomen is also dark brown, and has white hairs, but a wide white stripe down the middle. Long brown bristles mark the carapace near the eyes and can be found scattered along the edge of the abdomen. The chelicerae are brown, the clypeus is darker and the spinnerets are greyish brown. The spider has brown hairy legs. The spider has a large epigyne. It has a very narrow central pocket. The spider differs from the related Plexippus paykulli in having copulatory ducts that wind around and the presence of noticeable sclerotization around the gonopores. Only the female has been described.

== Distribution and habitat ==
The female holotype was collected in the district of Tsholotsho in Zimbabwe, in 2003. The spider was subsequently also found in both Nwambiya and the Marakele National Park in Limpopo, South Africa. It lives in savannah.
