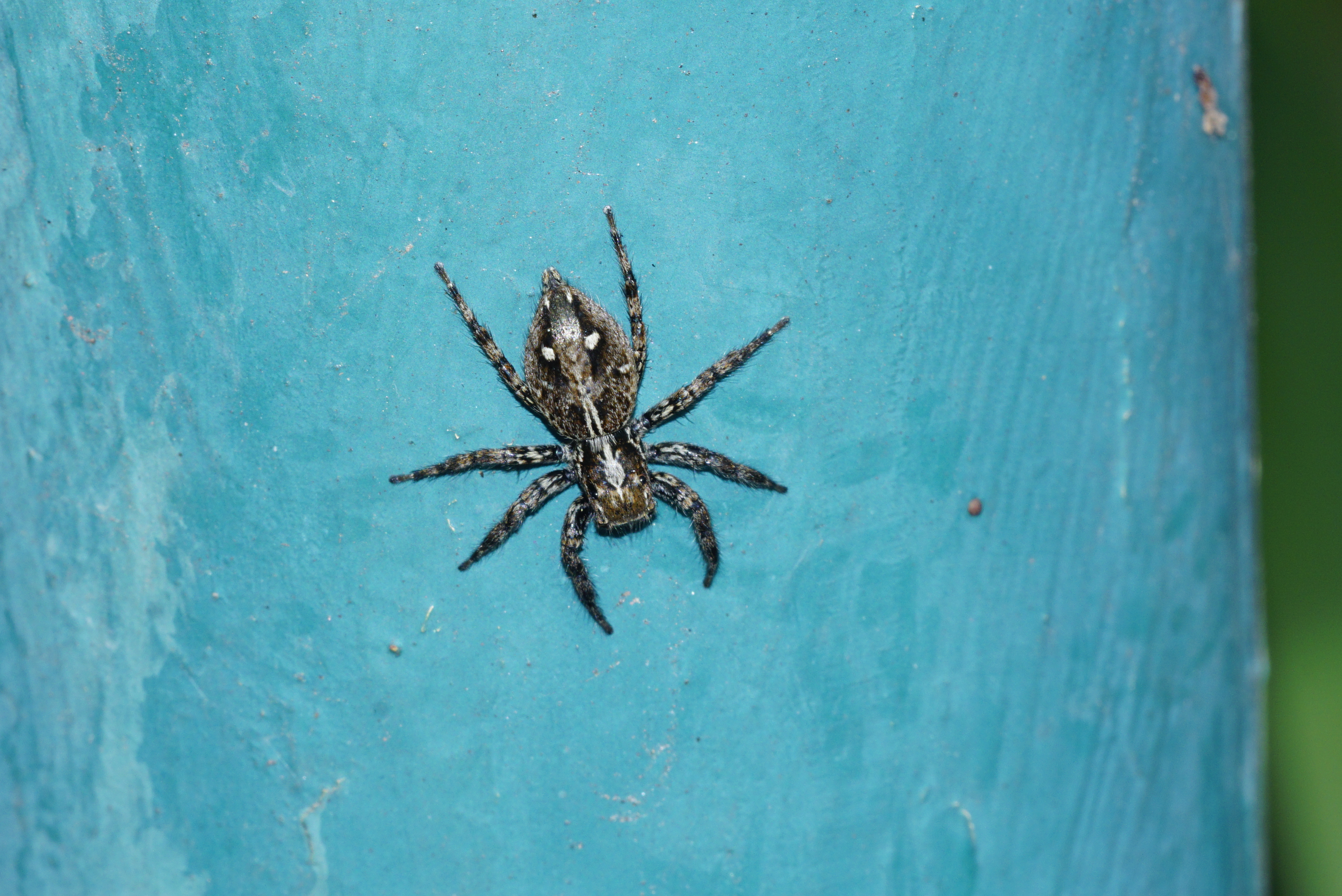
- A female of the related species Plexippus paykulli

Scientific classification
- Kingdom: Animalia
- Phylum: Arthropoda
- Subphylum: Chelicerata
- Class: Arachnida
- Order: Araneae
- Infraorder: Araneomorphae
- Family: Salticidae
- Genus: Plexippus
- Species: P. minor

Binomial name
- Plexippus minor Wesołowska & van Harten, 2010

= Plexippus minor =

Species of spider

Plexippus minor is a species of jumping spider in the genus Plexippus that lives in the United Arab Emirates. The male was first described by Wanda Wesołowska and Antonius van Harten in 2010 and the female in 2020. The spider is medium-sized with a cephalothorax between 3.1 and 3.8 mm (0.12 and 0.15 in) long and an abdomen between 3.3 and 4.1 mm (0.13 and 0.16 in) long. It has a shape and colouring typical of the genus. The male has an orange carapace while the female is brownish-fawn. The copulatory organs distinguish it from related species, particularly the male's shorter embolus and tibial apophysis and the female's wide pocket on its epigyne.

== Taxonomy ==
Plexippus minor is a jumping spider that was first described in 2010 by Wanda Wesołowska and Antonius van Harten. Initially, only the male was described, the female following in 2020. It is one of over 500 species identified by the Polish arachnologist. The jumping spider was placed in the genus Plexippus, first raised by Carl Ludwig Koch in 1846. The word plexippus is Greek and can be translated striking or driving horses. It was the name of a number of heroes in Homer's Iliad. The genus was placed in the subtribe Plexippina in the tribe Plexippini, both named after the genus, by Wayne Maddison in 2015, who listed the tribe in the clade Saltafresia. It was allocated to the subclade Simonida, named in honour of the French arachnologist Eugène Simon. In 2016, it was combined with 31 other genera into the group Christillines, named after the genus Chrysilla. In his 2017 study of the genus, Jerzy Prószyński placed Plexippus minor within the 20 species that were recognisable as unique.

== Description ==
Plexippus minor has a general appearance that is typical of the genus. It is a medium-sized spider. The male has a cephalothorax that measures between 3.1 and 3.3 mm (0.12 and 0.13 in) in length and between 2.3 and 2.5 mm (0.091 and 0.098 in) in width. The carapace is orange with white hairs, is marked with two large brown spots on the back and has a thin black line on the edge. White hairs also adorn the black eye field, which also has red hairs around some of the eyes. The chelicerae are dark brown with white hairs on the top. The abdomen is an oval that is between 3.3 and 3.4 mm (0.13 and 0.13 in) long and 2 mm (0.079 in) wide. It has three stripes on its back, the middle one being white and left and right ones brown. The spinnerets are light with dark tips. The forward legs are also dark, but the rearmost are yellow, although all have dark hairs. The pedipalps are generally more yellow. The bottom part of the cymbium is covered in white hair. The embolus is short, as is the tibial apophysis.

The female was first described ten years after the male. Similarly medium-sized, it has a cephalothorax that is typically 38 mm (1.5 in) long and 3 mm (0.12 in) wide. The carapace is brownish-fawn in colour with a very dark, nearly black eye field. Long bron and light bristles can be found around the eyes, and brown and grey hairs at the edges of the body. The chelicerae are similarly dark brown. The ovoid abdomen is typically 4.1 mm (0.16 in) long and 2.6 mm (0.10 in) wide. It is a greyish-beige and is covered in dense hairs. There are small dark markings on the top and a line down the middle of the bottom made of dark dots. The spinnerets are similarly greyish-beige, while the legs are all a light brown. The pedipalps have a yellow tinge. The epigyne is large and sclerotised and has a wide pocket. The copulatory openings are narrow. Internally, the copulatory organs are simple with straight seminal ducts leading to spherical spermathecas.

The spider differs from the related Plexippus paykulli in its copulatory organs. Particularly, the pedipalps are different. The female also has a wider and shorter epigynal pocket that is noticeably more to the rear. It can be differentiated from the Plexippus iranus by the way that the spermathecae connect to the accessory glands. The male can be distinguished from similar spiders by the combination of the smaller embolus and tibial apophysis.

== Distribution ==
Plexippus minor is endemic to United Arab Emirates. The holotype was collected from Wadi Shawkah in 2007. The species was named for the fact that it is smaller than the other Plexippus species that can be found in United Arab Emirates, Plexippus paykulli.
