= Plexippus redimitus =

Scientific classification
- Kingdom: Animalia
- Phylum: Arthropoda
- Subphylum: Chelicerata
- Class: Arachnida
- Order: Araneae
- Infraorder: Araneomorphae
- Family: Salticidae
- Genus: Plexippus
- Species: P. redimitus

Binomial name
- Plexippus redimitus Simon, 1902

Species of spider

Plexippus redimitus is a species of spider of the genus Plexippus. It is native to India and Sri Lanka.
