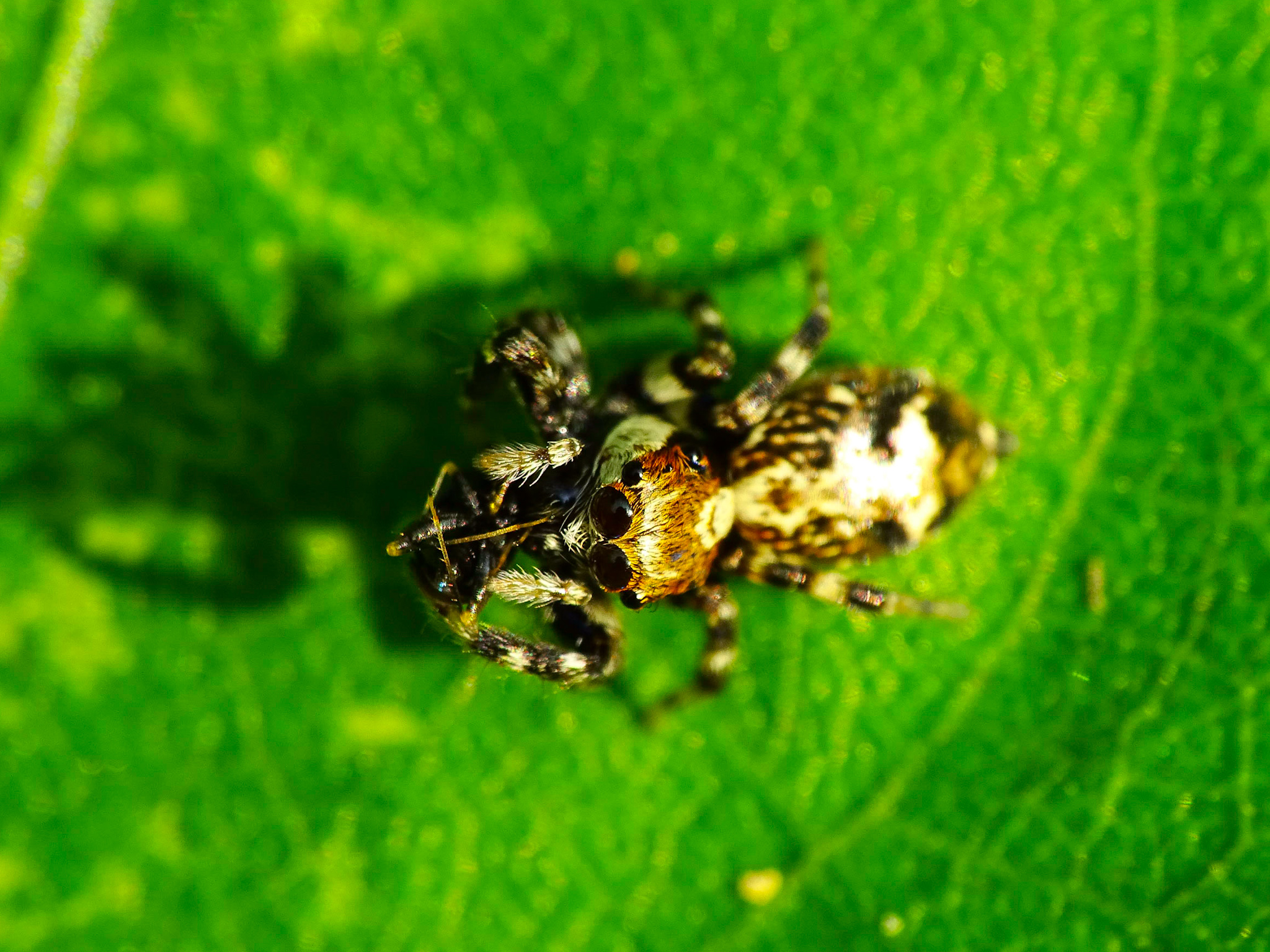
- A spider of the genus Plexippus

Scientific classification
- Kingdom: Animalia
- Phylum: Arthropoda
- Subphylum: Chelicerata
- Class: Arachnida
- Order: Araneae
- Infraorder: Araneomorphae
- Family: Salticidae
- Genus: Plexippus
- Species: P. lutescens

Binomial name
- Plexippus lutescens Wesołowska, 2011

= Plexippus lutescens =

Species of spider

Plexippus lutescens is a species of jumping spider in the genus Plexippus that lives in Namibia and Zimbabwe. It was first described in 2002 by Wanda Wesołowska. Only the male has been described. In 2017, Jerzy Prószyński declared it should be reclassified as the spider has a different palpal bulb to others in the genus, but this was not undertaken. It is a medium-sized spider, with a cephalothorax typically 3.3 mm (0.13 in) long and an abdomen that is 4 mm (0.16 in) long. The dark brown carapace has three white stripes and the reddish-brown abdomen has a single stripe of lighter brown. The spider has a short tibial apophysis and thin embolus. It lacks the lateral lobe on the palpal bulb that is visible on other species in the genus.

== Taxonomy ==
Plexippus lutescens is a jumping spider that was first described by the Polish arachnologist Wanda Wesołowska in 2011. It was one of over 500 species that she has identified. It was placed in the genus Plexippus, first raised by Carl Ludwig Koch in 1846. The word plexippus is Greek and can be translated striking or driving horses. It was the name of a number of heroes in Homer's Iliad. The species name is derived from a Latin word that can be translated dark, recalling the generally light colours on the palpal bulb. The genus was placed in the subtribe Plexippina in the tribe Plexippini, both named after the genus, by Wayne Maddison in 2015, who listed the tribe in the clade Saltafresia. It was allocated to the subclade Simonida, named in honour of the French arachnologist Eugène Simon. In 2016, it was combined with 31 other genera into the group Christillines, named after the genus Chrysilla. In his 2017 study of the genus, Jerzy Prószyński found that, as the palpal bulb does nor resemble other spiders in the genus, it should be reclassified. This was not undertaken, so the species remained in the genus Plexippus.

== Description ==
Plexippus lutescens is a medium-sized spider, with a cephalothorax that measures typically 3.3 mm (0.13 in) in length and 2.4 mm (0.094 in) in width, while the abdomen is typically 4 mm (0.16 in) long and 2.1 mm (0.083 in) wide. The carapace is a dark brown oval with a large white stripe that runs down the back from the eye field all the way to the back. There are two other white stripes on the edges. It has a covering of dense brown hairs. The chelicerae are a lighter brown and unidentate. The labium is brown with yellow tips. The abdomen is ovoid and has a more red-brown tinge and lighter stripe, surrounded by narrow lines. It is also covered with hairs, but these are generally colourless, although some examples have orange hairs on the stripes. The underside is orange, with a large triangular area in the middle that has three lines that cut across the design. The spinnerets are brown. The spider has hairy legs and pedipalps that have a short tibial apophysis, or appendage. The palpal bulb is very light, almost yellow, and lacks the lateral lobe seen on other species in the genus. The embolus is small and thin. Only the male has been described.

== Distribution ==
The male holotype was identified near Bindura in Zimbabwe. A paratype was found in the Otjozondjupa Region of Namibia in 2009. Examples include both fully-grown adults and younger, less well-developed spiders.
