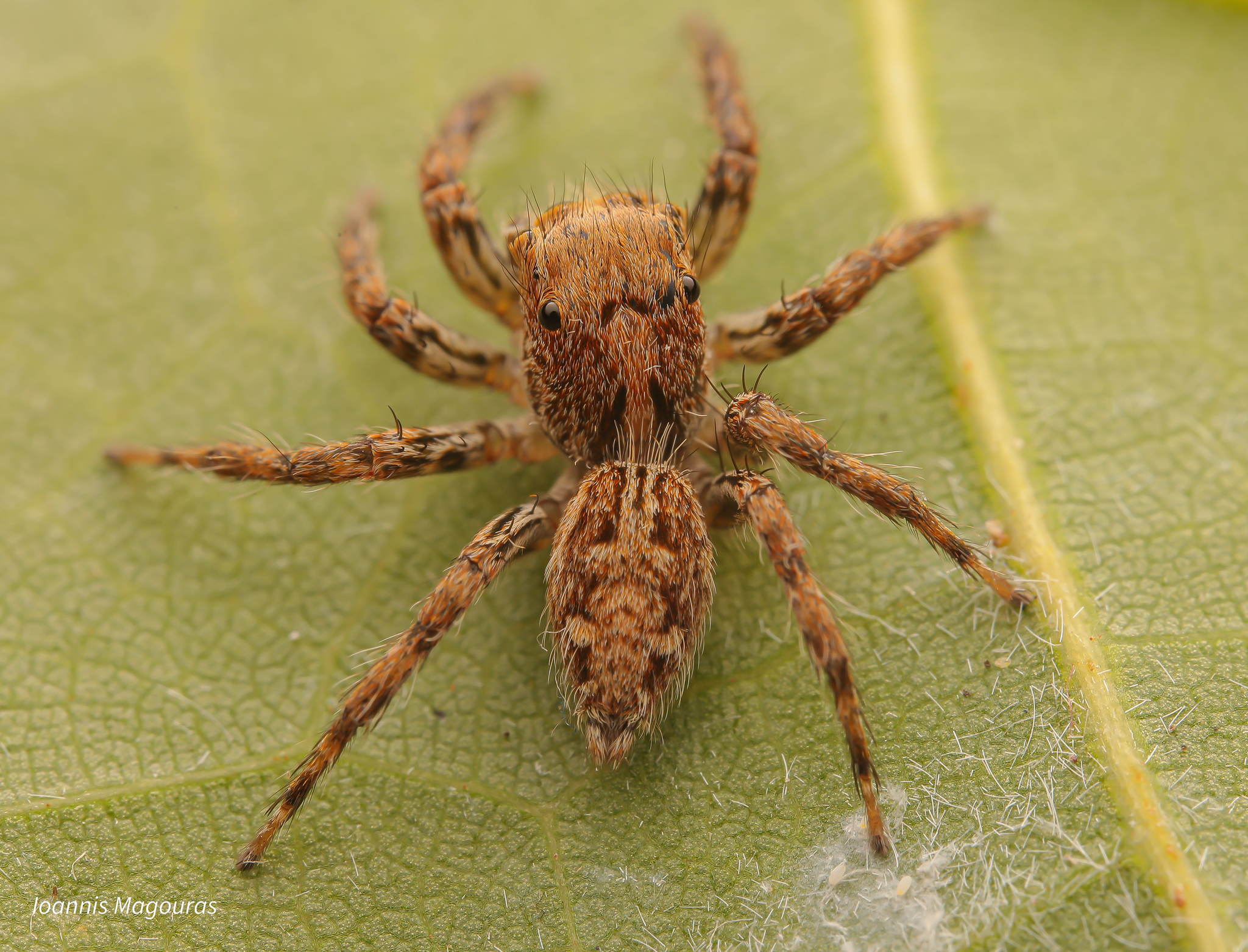
- Female
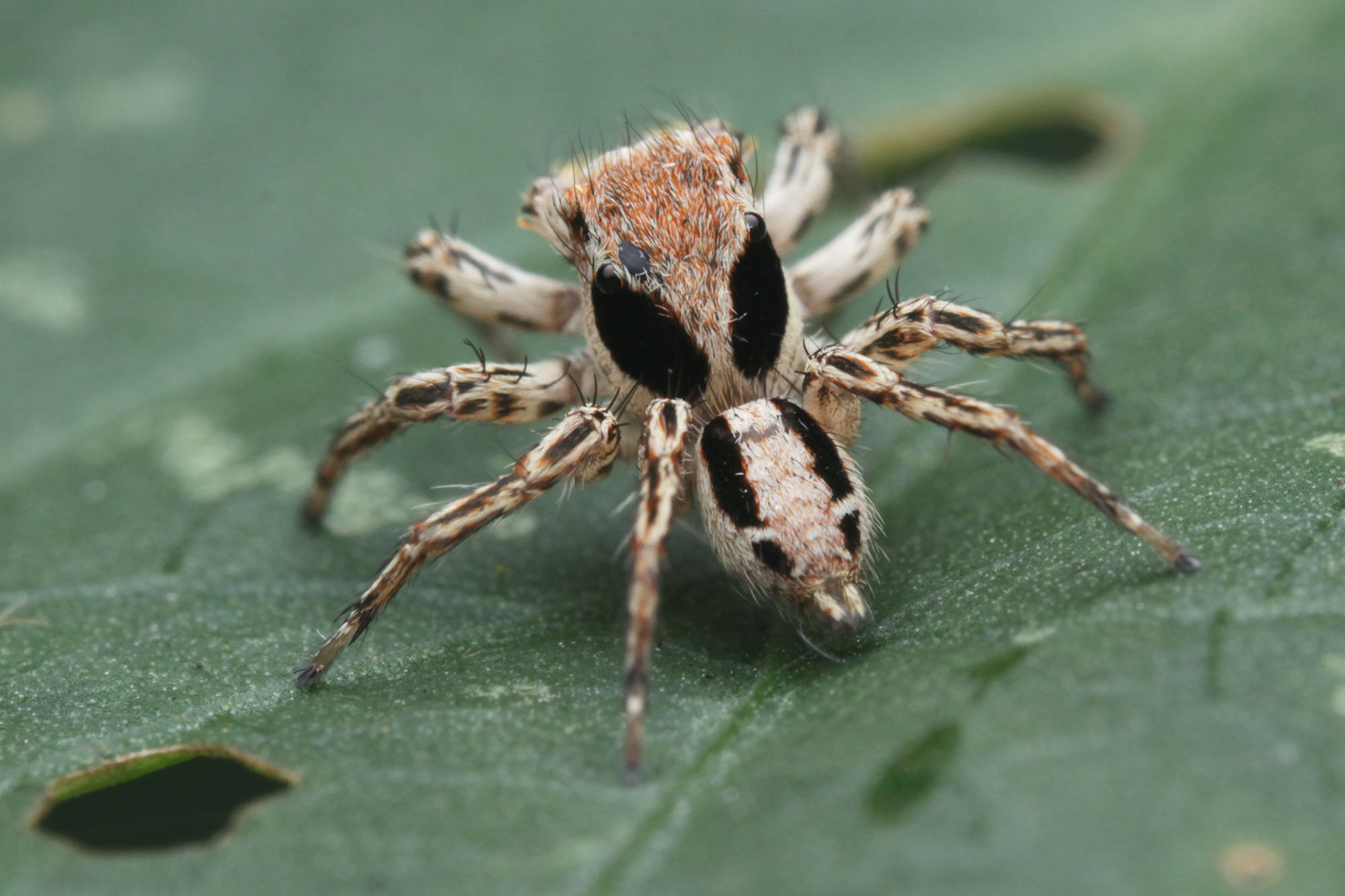

Scientific classification
- Kingdom: Animalia
- Phylum: Arthropoda
- Subphylum: Chelicerata
- Class: Arachnida
- Order: Araneae
- Infraorder: Araneomorphae
- Family: Salticidae
- Genus: Plexippus
- Species: P. petersi

Binomial name
- Plexippus petersi (Karsch, 1878)

= Plexippus petersi =

Species of arachnid

Plexippus petersi is a species of jumping spider native to Asia that has been introduced to Africa and Pacific islands. The male is between 6 and 10 mm (0.24 and 0.39 in) in length, and the female is around 10 millimetres (0.39 in). This spider is commonly known as the tropical flycatcher or small zebra jumper.

== Description ==
The male Plexippus petersi is between 6 and 10 mm (0.24 and 0.39 in) long and the female is slightly larger. The head bears four pairs of eyes, one pair is larger than the others, forward-facing and movable, while the remainder are small and fixed in position. The cephalothorax is longer than it is wide and is brown with two darker reddish-brown bands on the dorsal surface. The abdomen is twice as long as it is wide and is yellowish-brown dorsally with two longitudinal darker brown bands which are broken posteriorly to give a pair of orangish spots on either side; the ventral surface is yellowish-brown and the spinnerets are greyish-brown. The pale parts of the abdomen are clad with whitish setae (bristles), and the darker areas are covered with brown setae. The legs are yellowish-brown, streaked with darker brown and darker near the joints, and have blackish-brown leading edges. There are scattered setae on the legs and the femur has a dense patch of brown hairs.

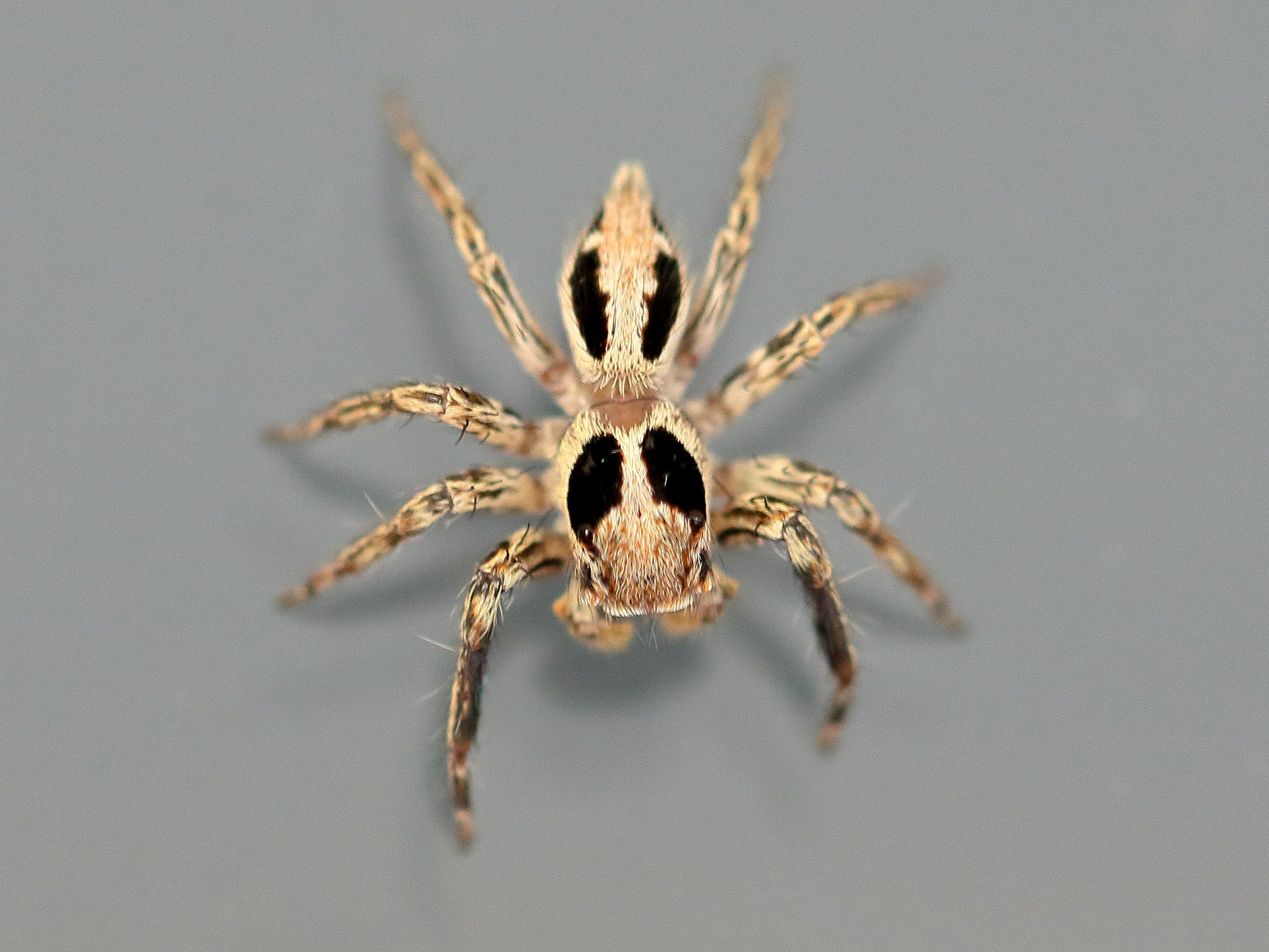
Male in Australia.

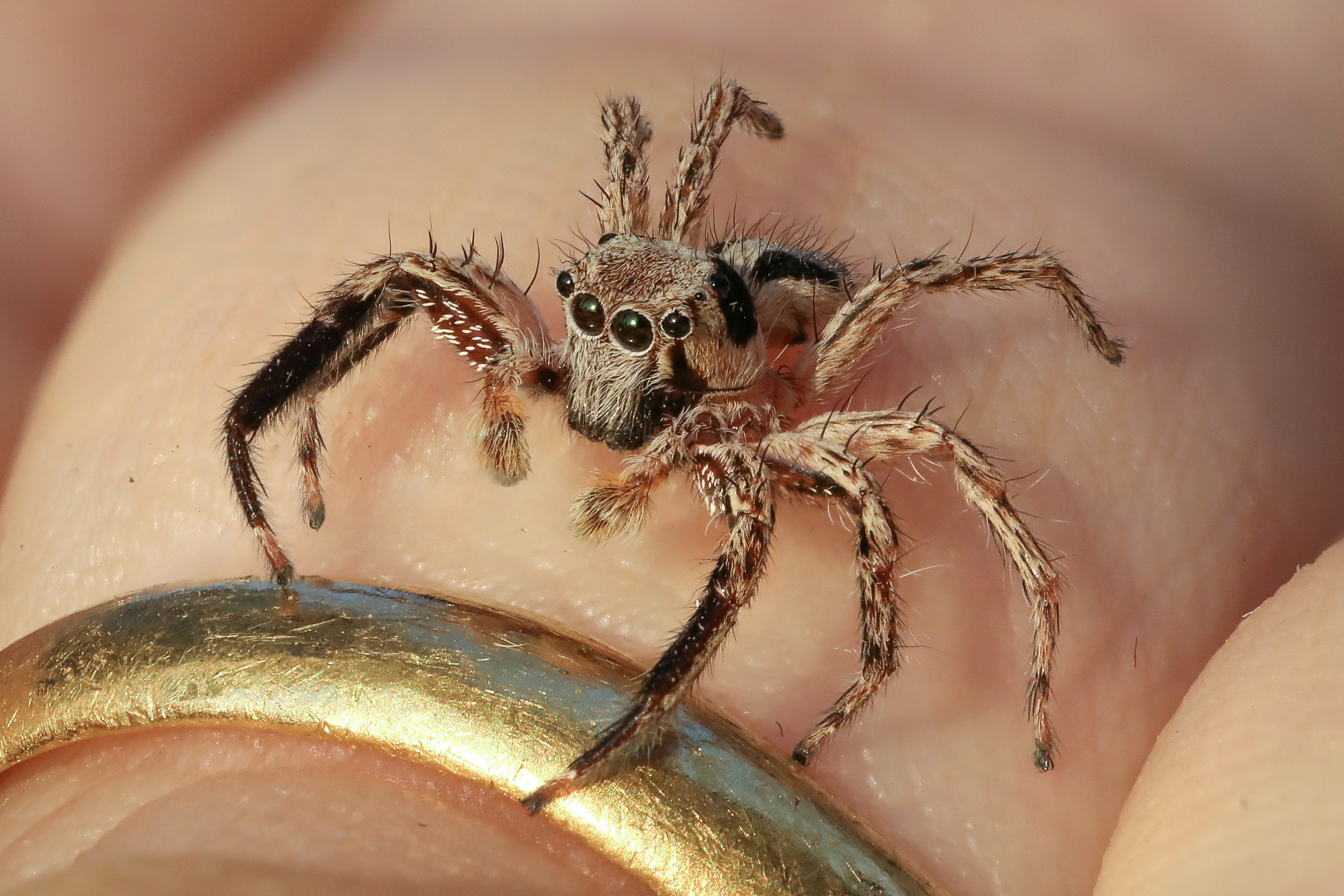
Male on a human finger

== Distribution ==
Plexippus petersi is native to Southeastern Asia. Its range includes Africa, China, Japan, Indonesia, New Guinea, the Philippines, Vietnam, Laos, Cambodia, India, Sri Lanka, Malaysia and Australia.

== Ecology ==
Plexippus petersi is a house spider, living indoors, and admired for the skilful way it hunts and catches mosquitoes, flies and other invertebrates. It has also been found living in crops in the Philippines, in one instance in a rice field infested with the armyworm Spodoptera mauritia, and in another, in a corn field attacked by the northern armyworm Mythimna separata. This spider has been investigated as a control agent for houseflies and showed potential as a bio-control agent.
