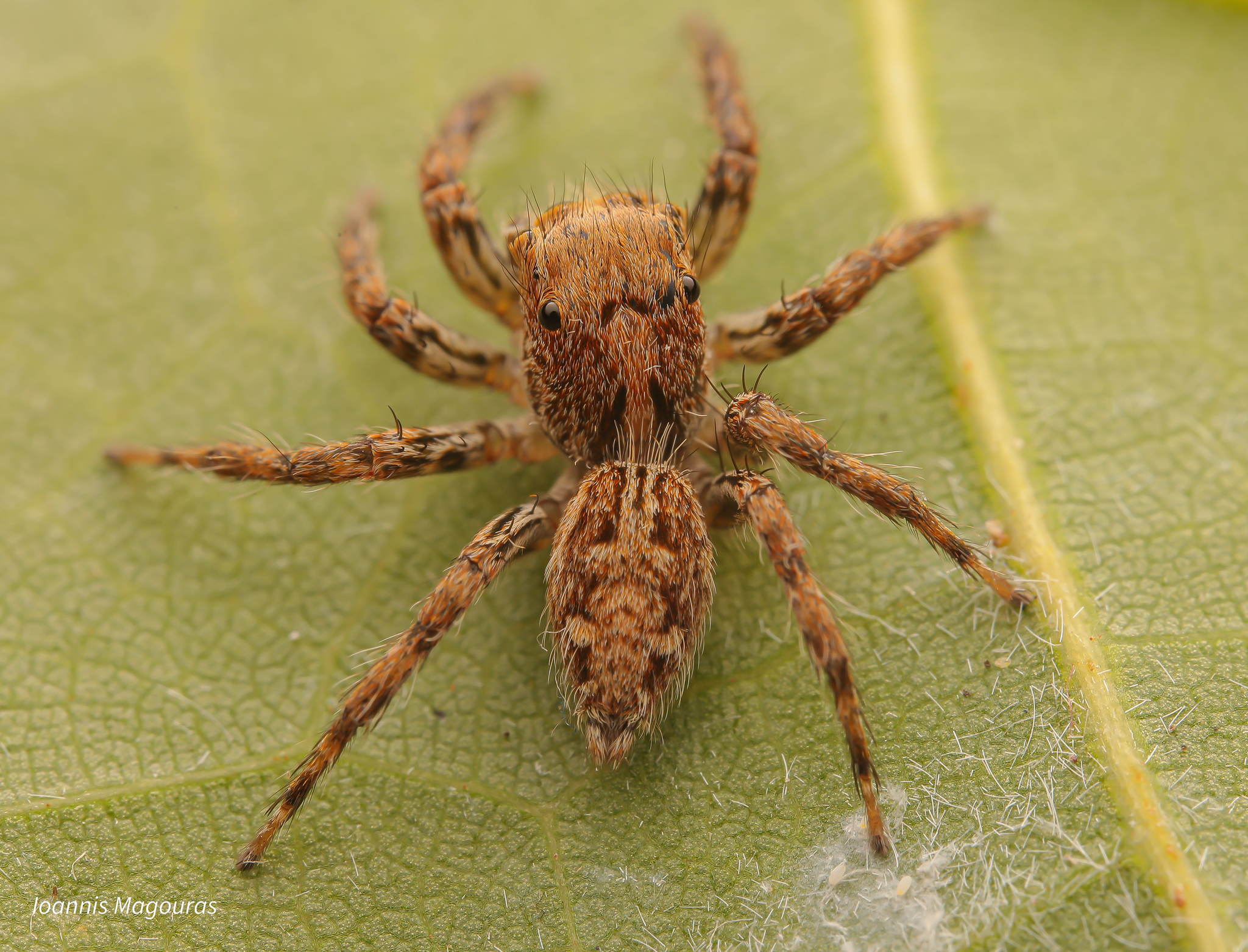
- female P. petersi
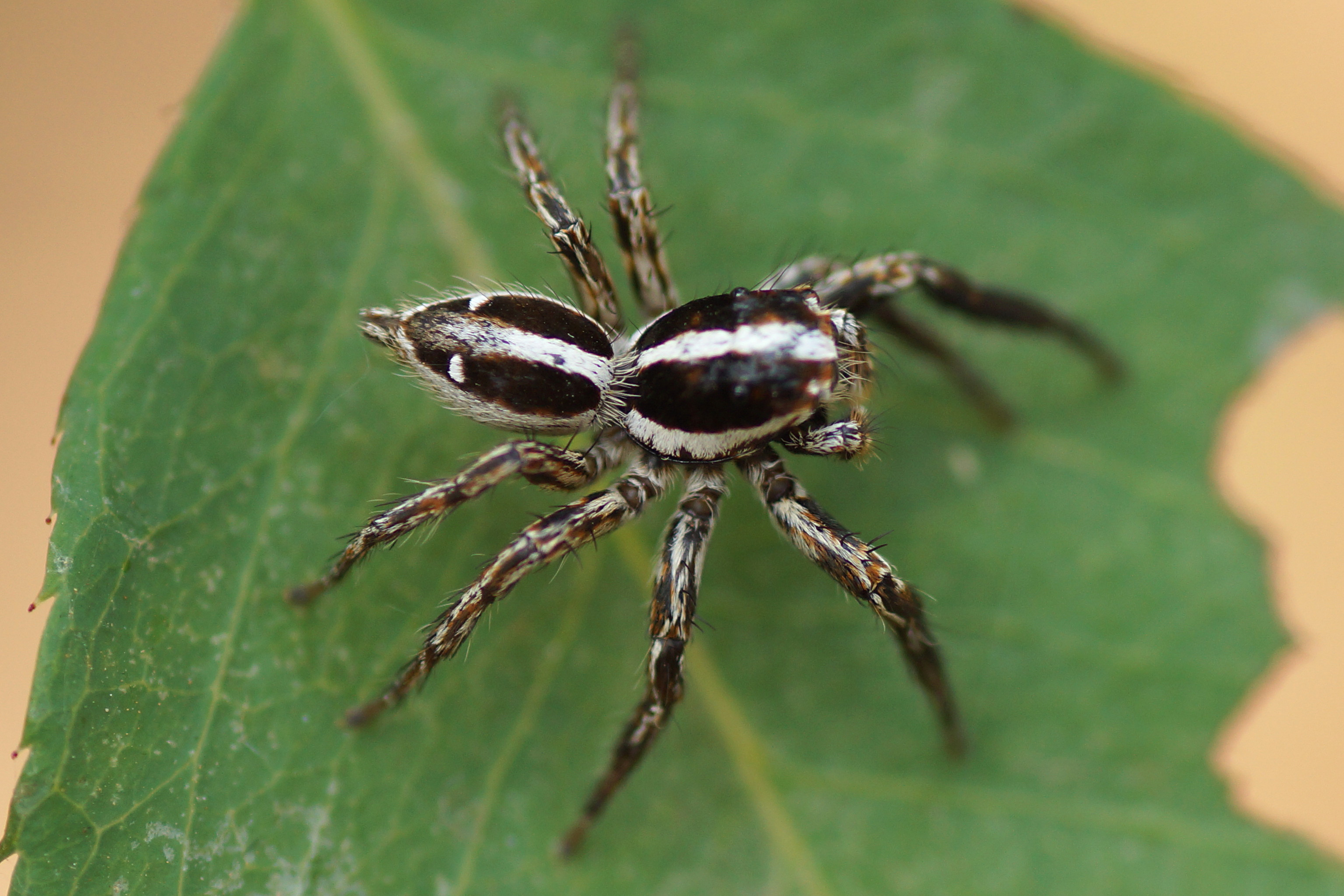
- male P. paykulli

Scientific classification
- Kingdom: Animalia
- Phylum: Arthropoda
- Subphylum: Chelicerata
- Class: Arachnida
- Order: Araneae
- Infraorder: Araneomorphae
- Family: Salticidae
- Subfamily: Salticinae
- Genus: Plexippus; C. L. Koch, 1846

Type species
- P. paykulli (Audouin, 1826)

Species
- 40, see text

Synonyms
- Apamamia Roewer, 1944; Hissarinus Charitonov, 1951

= Plexippus (spider) =

Genus of spiders

Plexippus is a genus of jumping spiders that was first described by Carl Ludwig Koch in 1846. It is considered a senior synonym of Hissarinus and Apamamia.

== Taxonomy ==
In Maddison's 2015 classification of the family Salticidae, Plexippus is placed in the tribe Plexippini, part of the Salticoida clade of the subfamily Salticinae.

== Distribution ==
Plexippus are found in Oceania, Asia, Europe, Africa, North and South America, Australia, and on the Pacific Islands.

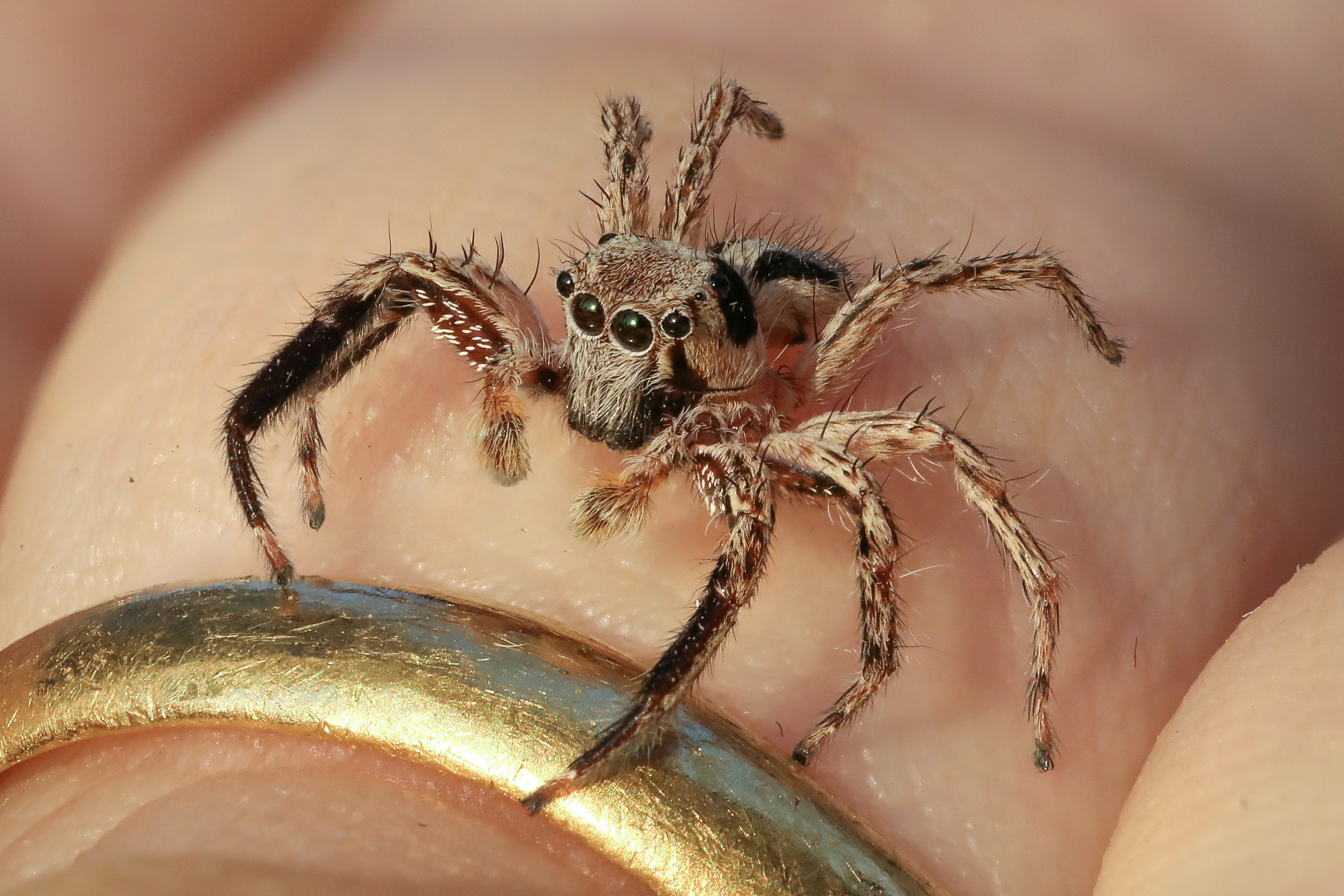
male P. petersi

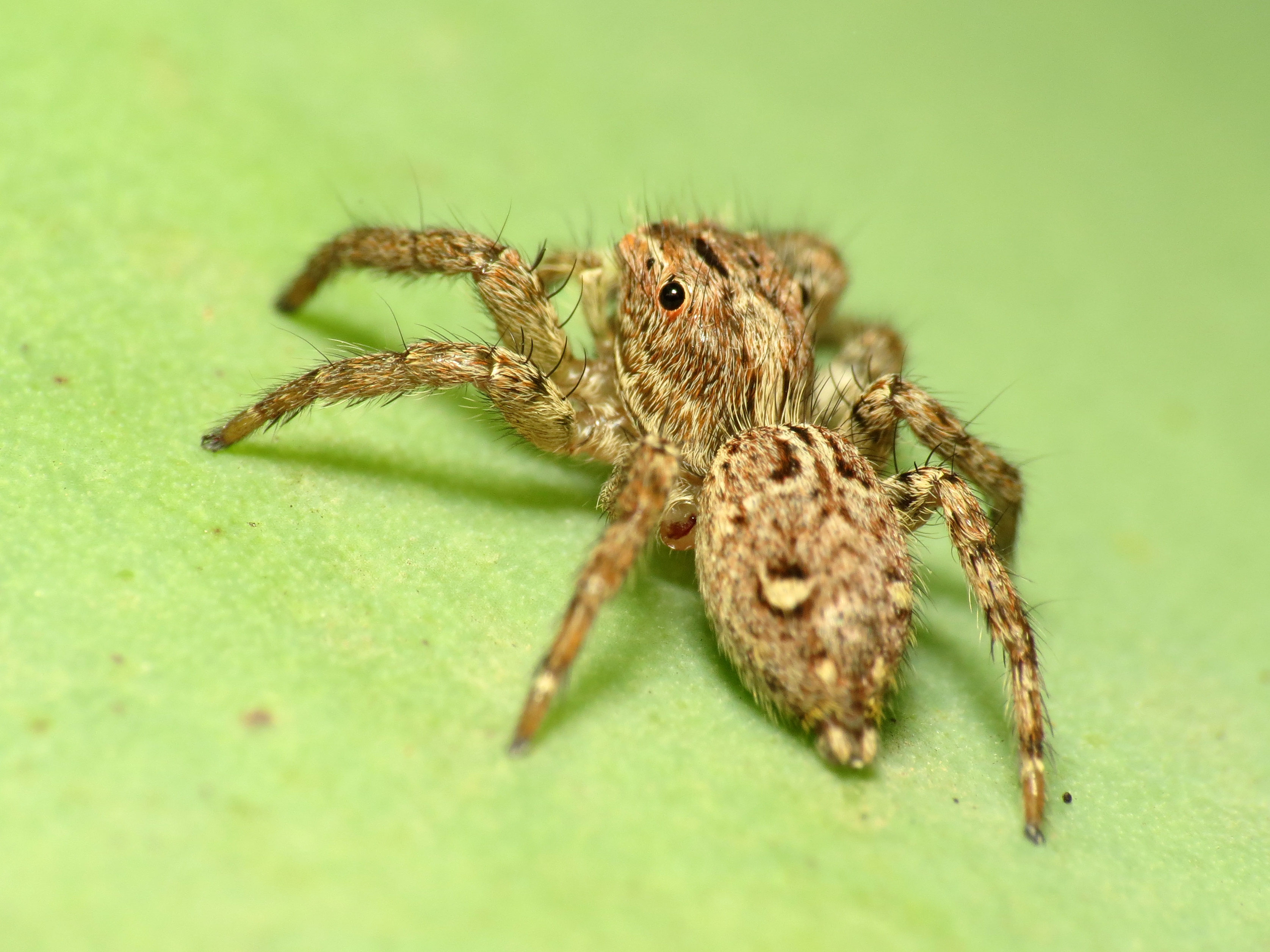
female P. paykulli

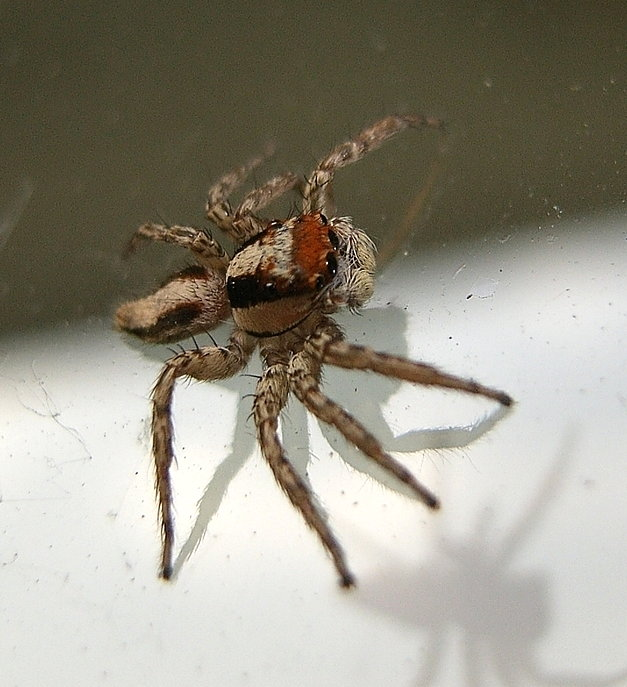
Plexippus setipes

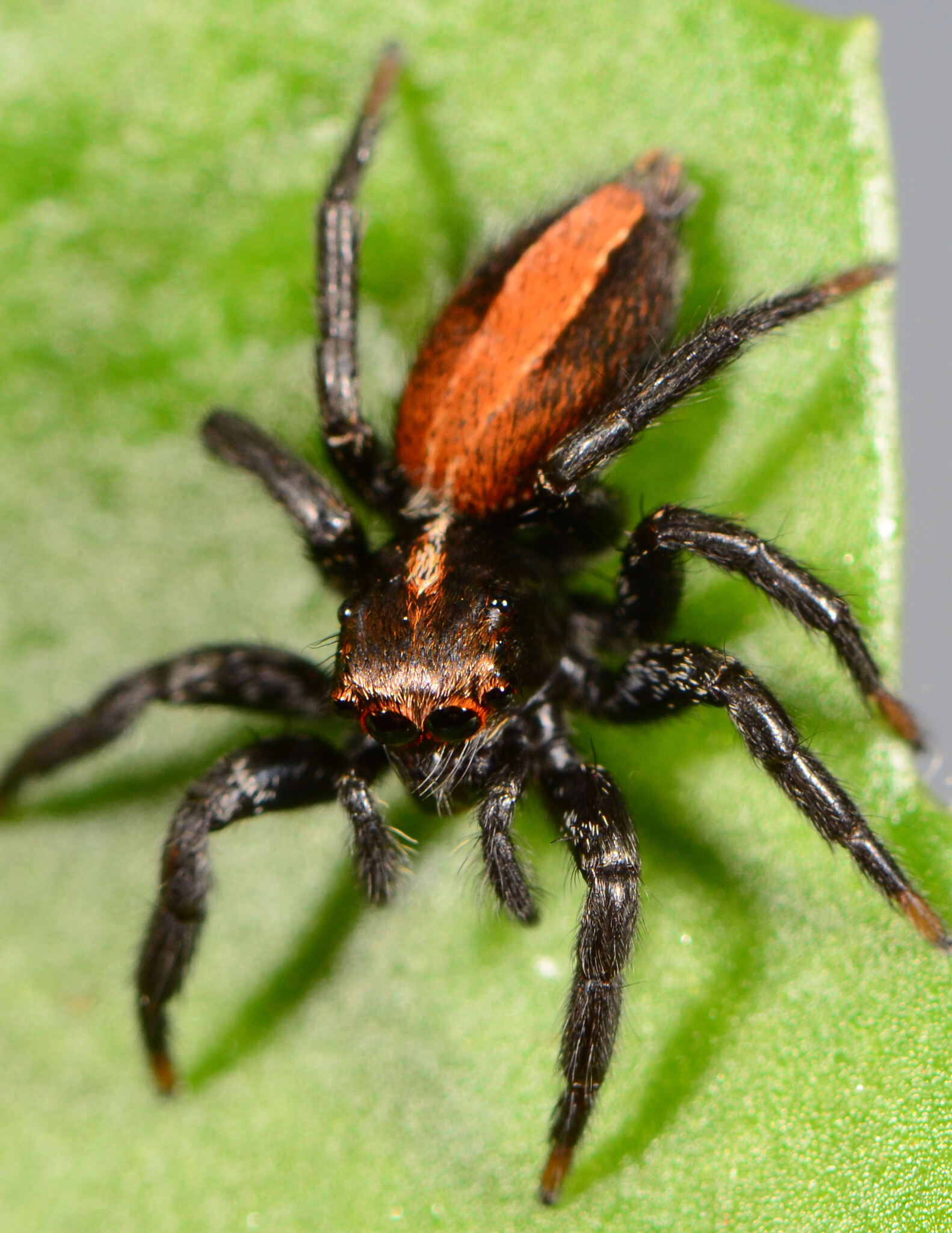
female P. tsholotsho

== Species ==
As of October 2025, this genus includes forty species:

- Plexippus aper Thorell, 1881 – New Guinea
- Plexippus auberti Lessert, 1925 – Uganda, Kenya, Tanzania
- Plexippus baro Wesołowska & Tomasiewicz, 2008 – Guinea, Ethiopia
- Plexippus bhutani Żabka, 1990 – Bhutan, China
- Plexippus brachypus Thorell, 1881 – Papua New Guinea (Yule Is.)
- Plexippus clemens (O. Pickard-Cambridge, 1872) – Algeria, Libya, Egypt, Turkey, Israel, Yemen, Iran, Pakistan, India, China, Morocco?
- Plexippus coccinatus Thorell, 1895 – Myanmar
- Plexippus coccineus Simon, 1902 – Turkey ('Turcomania')
- Plexippus devorans (O. Pickard-Cambridge, 1872) – Morocco, Algeria, Greece, Cyprus, Israel, Azerbaijan
- Plexippus frendens Thorell, 1881 – New Guinea
- Plexippus fuscus Rollard & Wesołowska, 2002 – Guinea
- Plexippus ignatius Caleb, 2022 – India
- Plexippus incognitus Dönitz & Strand, 1906 – China, Korea, Taiwan, Japan
- Plexippus insulanus Thorell, 1881 – Indonesia (Moluccas)
- Plexippus iranus Logunov, 2009 – Iran
- Plexippus kondarensis (Charitonov, 1951) – Kazakhstan, Tajikistan
- Plexippus lutescens Wesołowska, 2011 – Namibia, Zimbabwe, Mozambique
- Plexippus minor Wesołowska & van Harten, 2010 – United Arab Emirates, India
- Plexippus niccensis Strand, 1906 – Japan
- Plexippus ochropsis Thorell, 1881 – New Guinea
- Plexippus paykulli (Audouin, 1826) – Africa. Introduced to both Americas, Europe, Middle East, Iran, Pakistan, India, Nepal, southern Asia, Australia, Pacific Islands (type species)
- Plexippus perfidus Thorell, 1895 – Myanmar
- Plexippus petersi (Karsch, 1878) – Asia. Introduced to Africa, Pacific is. Mexico
- Plexippus phyllus Karsch, 1878 – Australia (New South Wales)
- Plexippus pokharae Żabka, 1990 – Nepal
- Plexippus redimitus Simon, 1902 – India, Sri Lanka
- Plexippus robustus (Bösenberg & Lenz, 1895) – Tanzania
- Plexippus rubroclypeatus (Lessert, 1927) – DR Congo
- Plexippus rubrogularis Simon, 1902 – South Africa
- Plexippus scleroepigynalis Logunov, 2023 – Iran
- Plexippus seladonicus C. L. Koch, 1846 – Mexico
- Plexippus sengleti Logunov, 2021 – Afghanistan
- Plexippus setipes Karsch, 1879 – Turkmenistan, China, Korea, Thailand, Vietnam, Japan
- Plexippus strandi Spassky, 1939 – Israel, Iran, Uzbekistan, Turkmenistan, Tajikistan, Afghanistan, Azerbaijan? Greece?
- Plexippus stridulator Pocock, 1898 – Papua New Guinea (New Britain)
- Plexippus taeniatus C. L. Koch, 1846 – Mexico
- Plexippus tortilis Simon, 1902 – West Africa
- Plexippus tsholotsho Wesołowska, 2011 – Zimbabwe, South Africa
- Plexippus wesolowskae Biswas & Raychaudhuri, 1998 – Bangladesh
- Plexippus zabkai Biswas, 1999 – Bangladesh
