= Plexippus devorans =

Scientific classification
- Kingdom: Animalia
- Phylum: Arthropoda
- Subphylum: Chelicerata
- Class: Arachnida
- Order: Araneae
- Infraorder: Araneomorphae
- Family: Salticidae
- Genus: Plexippus
- Species: P. devorans

Binomial name
- Plexippus devorans (O. Pickard-Cambridge, 1872)

Species of spider

Plexippus devorans is a jumping spider that has a distribution that stretches from Greece to Central Asia and also includes Algeria. Originally placed in the genus Salticus by Octavius Pickard-Cambridge in 1872, the species was transferred into the genus Hasarius by Eugène Simon in 1876, into Menemerus by Jerzy Prószyński in 1984, and eventually into Plexippus by Prószyński in 2003.

== Synonyms ==
Synonyms for the species include:

- Plexippus coccineus Simon, 1902
- Plexippus strandi Spassky, 1939
