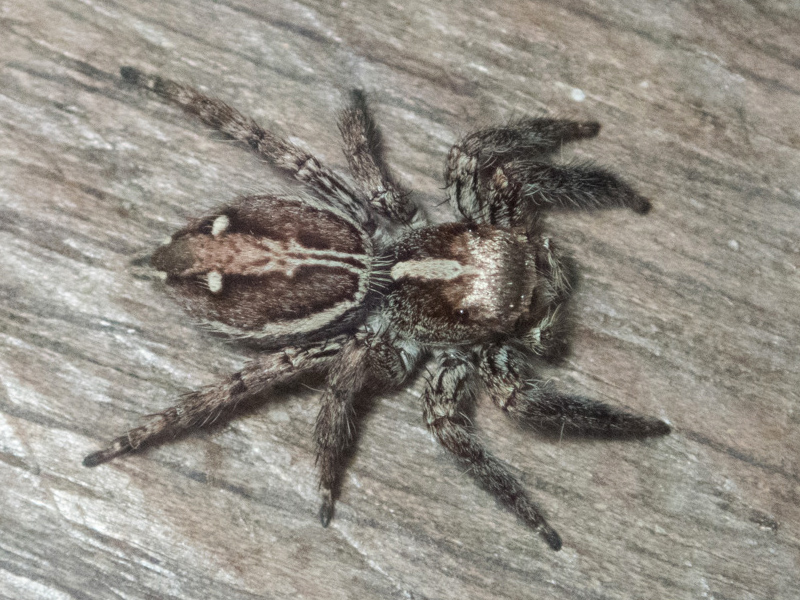
- Female Plexippus paykulli
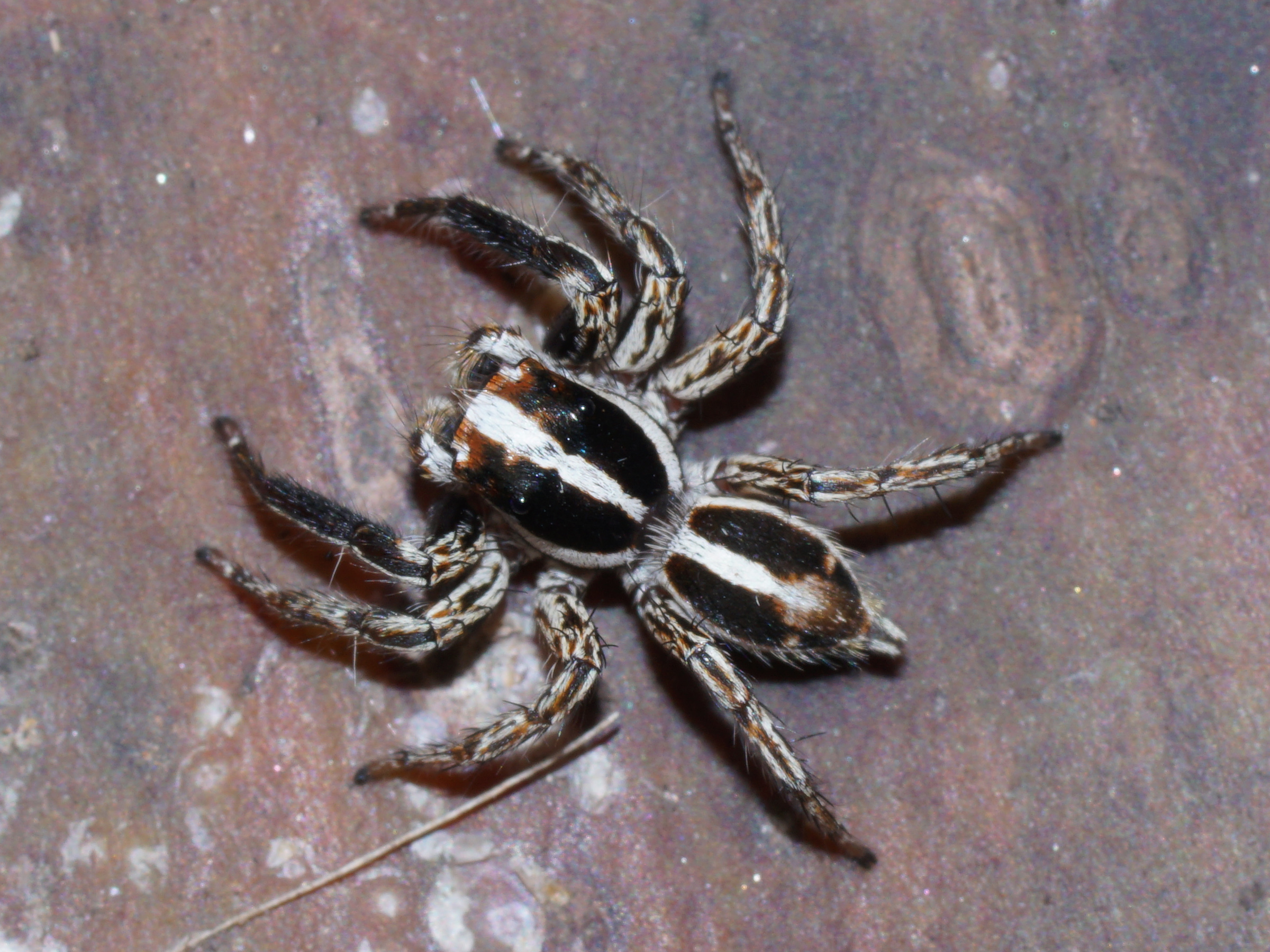
- Male Plexippus paykulli

Scientific classification
- Kingdom: Animalia
- Phylum: Arthropoda
- Subphylum: Chelicerata
- Class: Arachnida
- Order: Araneae
- Infraorder: Araneomorphae
- Family: Salticidae
- Genus: Plexippus
- Species: P. paykulli

Binomial name
- Plexippus paykulli (Audouin, 1826)

Synonyms
- List: Attus paykullii Audouin, 1826; Attus ligo Walckenaer, 1837; Plexipus ligo C.L.Koch, 1846; Plexippus punctatus Karsch, 1878; Thotmes paykulli F.O. Pickard-Cambridge, 1901; Menemerus crassus Hogg, 1922; Hyllus mimus Chamberlin, 1924; Sandalodes magnus Berland, 1933; Apamamia bocki Roewer, 1944; Plexippus quadriguttatus Mello-Leitão, 1946; Marpissa bengalensis Tikader, 1974; Marpissa mandali Tikader, 1974

= Plexippus paykulli =

Species of spider

Plexippus paykulli is a species of jumping spider. It is native to Southeast Asia, but now has a cosmopolitan distribution. In the United States it is commonly known as the pantropical jumping spider. It is usually associated with buildings and may be found near light sources catching insects attracted by the light. It is named in honor of Gustaf von Paykull.

== Distribution ==
Plexippus paykulli is cosmopolitan in distribution. It is native to tropical regions of Africa and Asia. The species has been introduced to the Americas, where it can be found from the southern United States to Paraguay. It has also been introduced to Australia, where it is present in Queensland, the Northern Territory, and the Torres Strait Islands. It is also found in the islands of the Maldives.

== Description ==
Plexippus paykulli is robust, with a high carapace. It is covered with short greyish hairs with sometimes dramatic accents of red in the male. Females are 9 to 12 mm (0.35 to 0.47 in) in body length, while males are 9 to 11 mm (0.35 to 0.43 in). The sexes can be distinguished by the black carapace of the male and abdomen with a broad white central stripe, another broad white stripe on either side and a pair of white spots near the posterior end of the abdomen. The stripe continues to the anterior eyes, so the face appears to have three white stripes on a black background. The female is brownish grey, the carapace being darker especially around the eyes, with a broad tan stripe that extends onto the abdomen where it breaks into two chevrons. There are two white spots on either side of the posterior end of the abdomen. Immature spiders resemble the females.

== Album ==
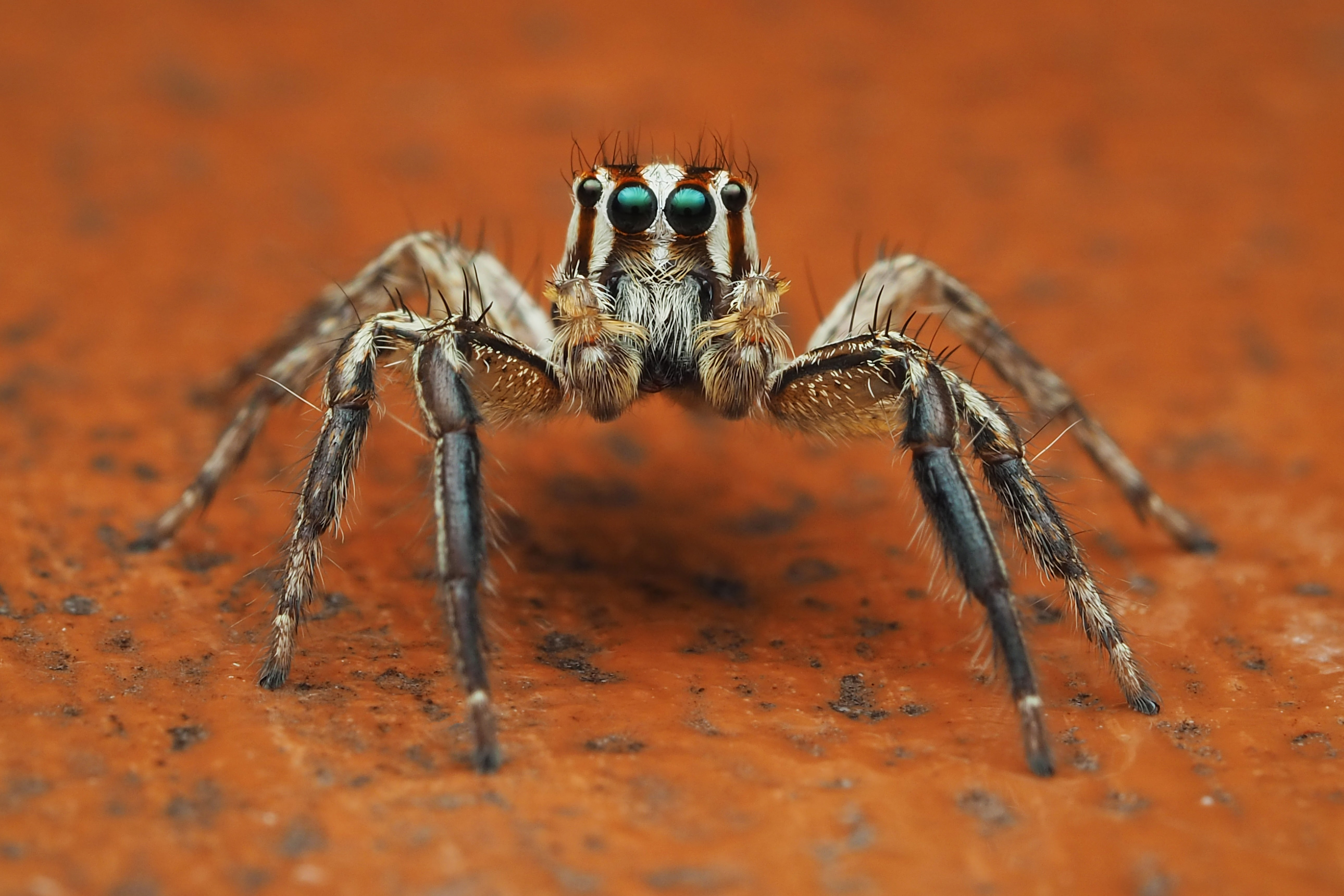
Front view of male

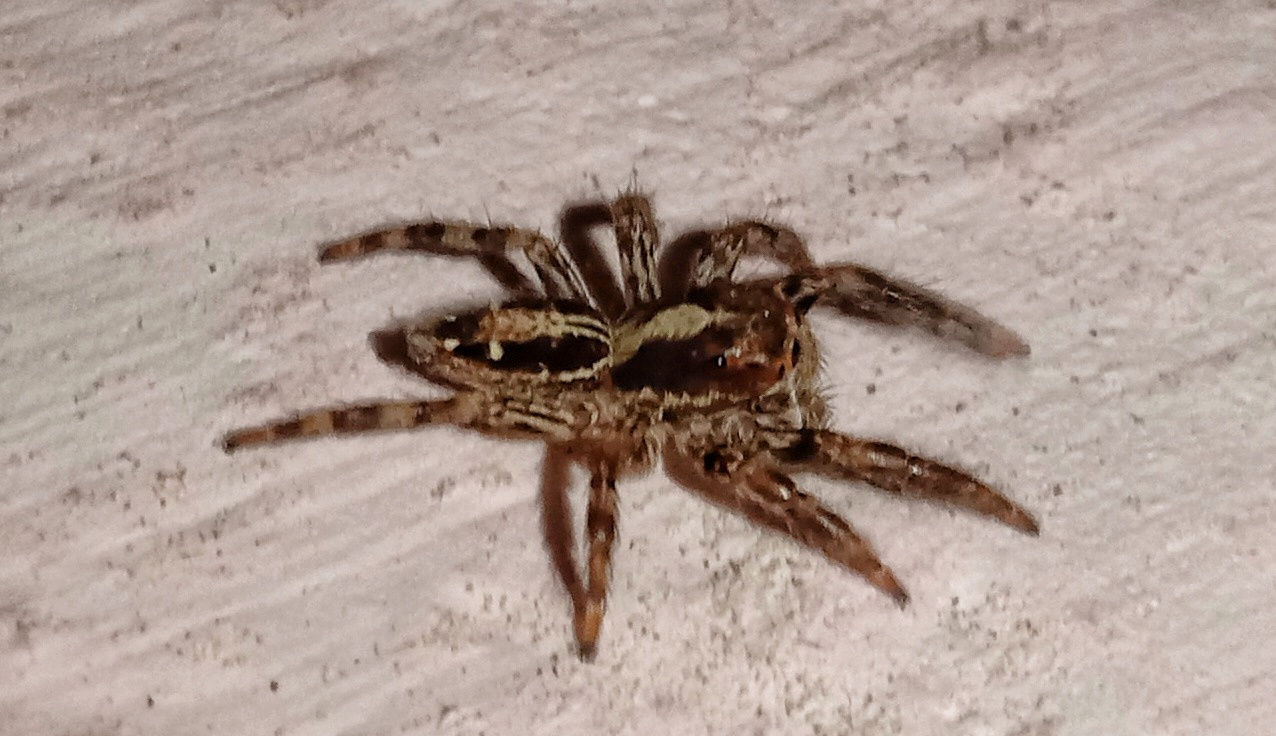
A Plexippus paykulli captured in India

Living Plexippus paykulli in Japan

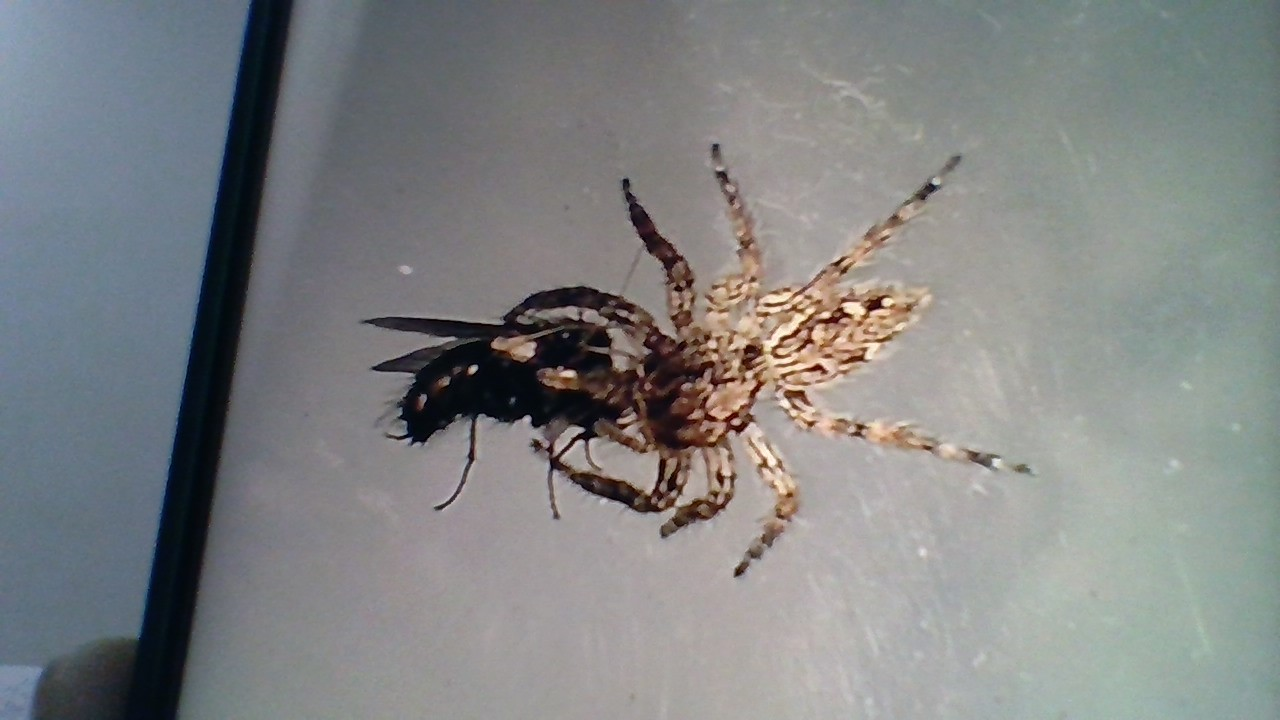
A female plexippus paykulli feeding on a fly in Malaysia

== Behaviour ==
Plexippus paykulli is generally found living on and around man-made structures, in particular on buildings, although it has also been recorded from citrus groves and cotton fields.The female creates an eggsac about 3 centimetres (1.2 in) in diameter in a concealed location under floorboards, in a crack or under eaves. In this a lens-shaped silken case is made into which 35 to 60 eggs are deposited. The female guards these until the spiderlings emerge and disperse some three to four weeks later.

Like all jumping spiders, this species does not spin a web but builds a silken retreat in an elevated position such as the edge of the ceiling from which it makes hunting forays. It has very acute eyesight and approaches its target prey stealthily, leaping on it when close enough. They are highly agile and can cover many times their own body length in a single jump.

Plexippus paykulli stalks its prey by orienting itself towards the prey, approaching rapidly, then slowing down to crouch and jump up to 50 millimetres (2.0 in) at the target. It was found that this species stalks mobile prey like flies in a different manner to immobile prey such as maggots. On a camouflaged background, the spider approached with greater stealth and jumped from a shorter distance to attack a mobile prey item. This gave the spider a greater likelihood of a successful outcome without prior detection.

== Diet ==
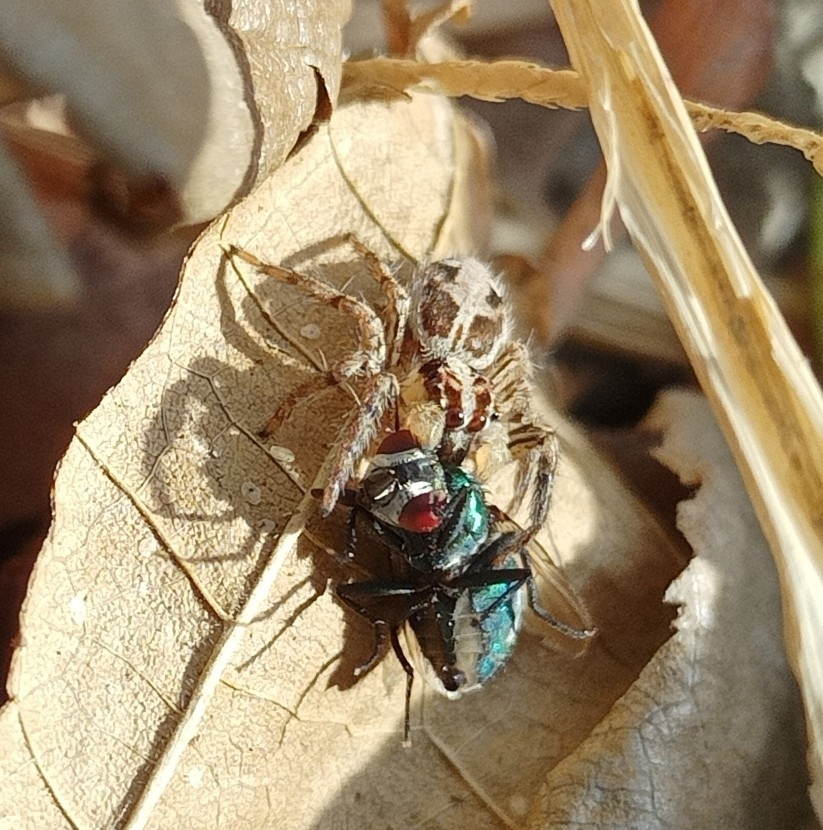
Juvenile male eating a fly

Plexippus paykulli is a generalist predator that uses brute strength to subdue its prey, including both insects and other spiders. In a study done in New Zealand, these spiders hunted and consumed individuals of sixteen species of arthropod from fourteen families and six orders. They are reported as being a predator of mosquitoes in African houses and of agricultural pests such as the cotton jassid and the sugarcane planthopper. In a building where the only available prey were German cockroaches, Blattella germanica, the spiders not only survived but also bred on this monophagous diet. They are able to successfully kill prey twice their own size. Large arthropods are injected with venom but are usually overpowered by brute strength before the venom has immobilized them. There have been records of the prey flying, jumping or running away with the spider clinging to it until the victim was eventually overpowered.

The protein fractions of Plexippus paykulli venom have bio-insecticide potential.
