= C. xanthogramma =

C. xanthogramma may refer to:

- Carrhotus xanthogramma, a spider species
- Choreutis xanthogramma, a moth species
