= Carrhotus taprobanicus =

Scientific classification
- Kingdom: Animalia
- Phylum: Arthropoda
- Subphylum: Chelicerata
- Class: Arachnida
- Order: Araneae
- Infraorder: Araneomorphae
- Family: Salticidae
- Genus: Carrhotus
- Species: C. taprobanicus

Binomial name
- Carrhotus taprobanicus Simon, 1902

Species of spider

Carrhotus taprobanicus, is a species of spider of the genus Carrhotus. It is endemic to Sri Lanka.
