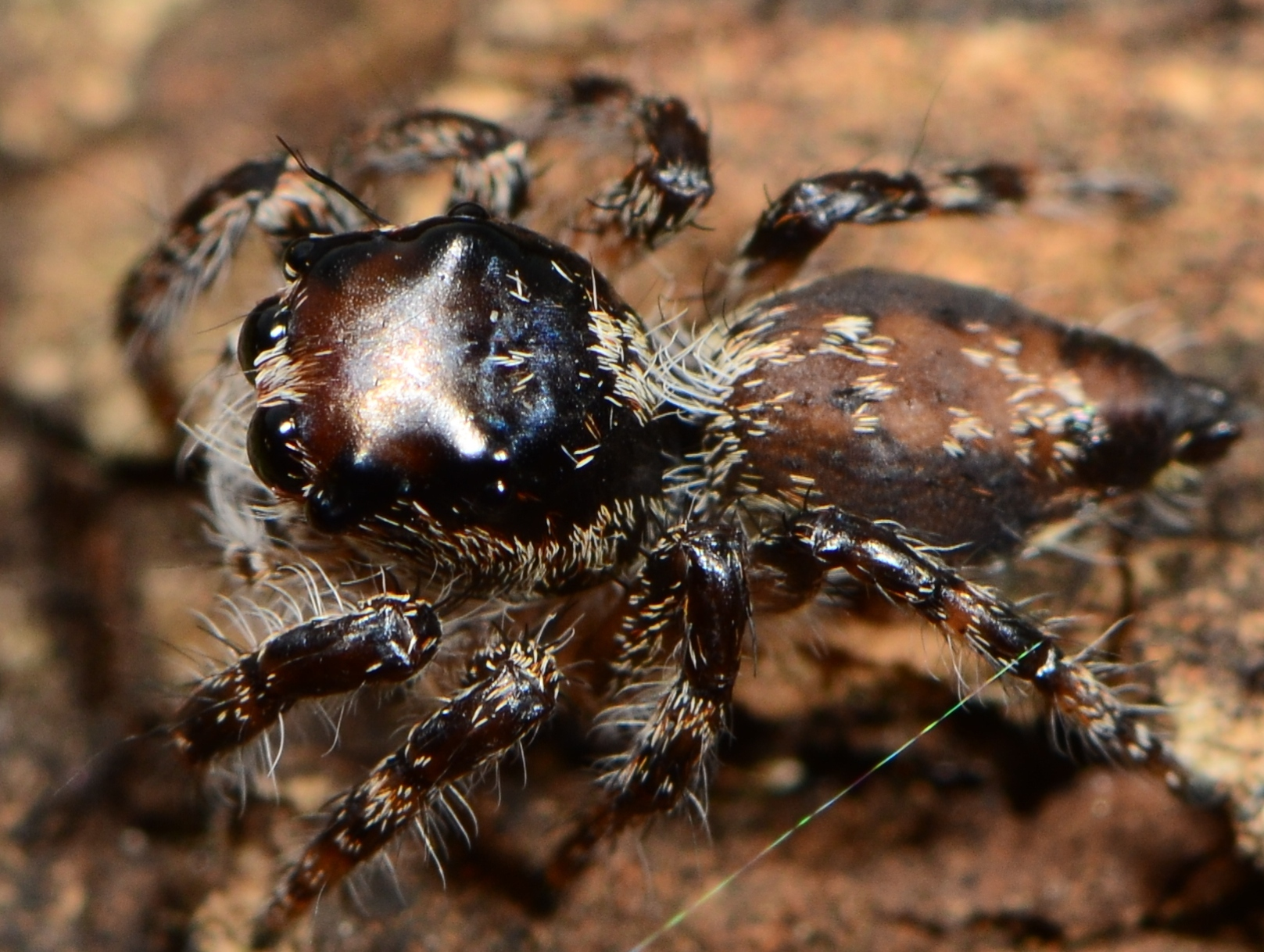
- female
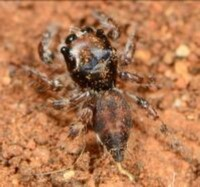
- female

Scientific classification
- Kingdom: Animalia
- Phylum: Arthropoda
- Subphylum: Chelicerata
- Class: Arachnida
- Order: Araneae
- Infraorder: Araneomorphae
- Family: Salticidae
- Genus: Carrhotus
- Species: C. singularis

Binomial name
- Carrhotus singularis Simon, 1902

= Carrhotus singularis =

Bloemfontein Carrhotus Jumping Spider

Species of spider

Carrhotus singularis is a species of spider in the family Salticidae. It is endemic to South Africa and is commonly known as the Bloemfontein Carrhotus jumping spider.

== Distribution ==
Carrhotus singularis is found only in South Africa. The species has been sampled from three isolated localities in Eastern Cape Province and Free State Province.

== Habitat and ecology ==
These are free-living plant-dwellers at altitudes ranging from 778 to 1,479 m. They are found on shrubs and plants, mainly in the Grassland Biome.

== Conservation ==
Carrhotus singularis is listed as Data Deficient for taxonomic reasons. Placement of the species is still problematic. The species is protected in Asante Sana Private Game Reserve. There are no known threats to the species, but more sampling is needed to determine its range.
