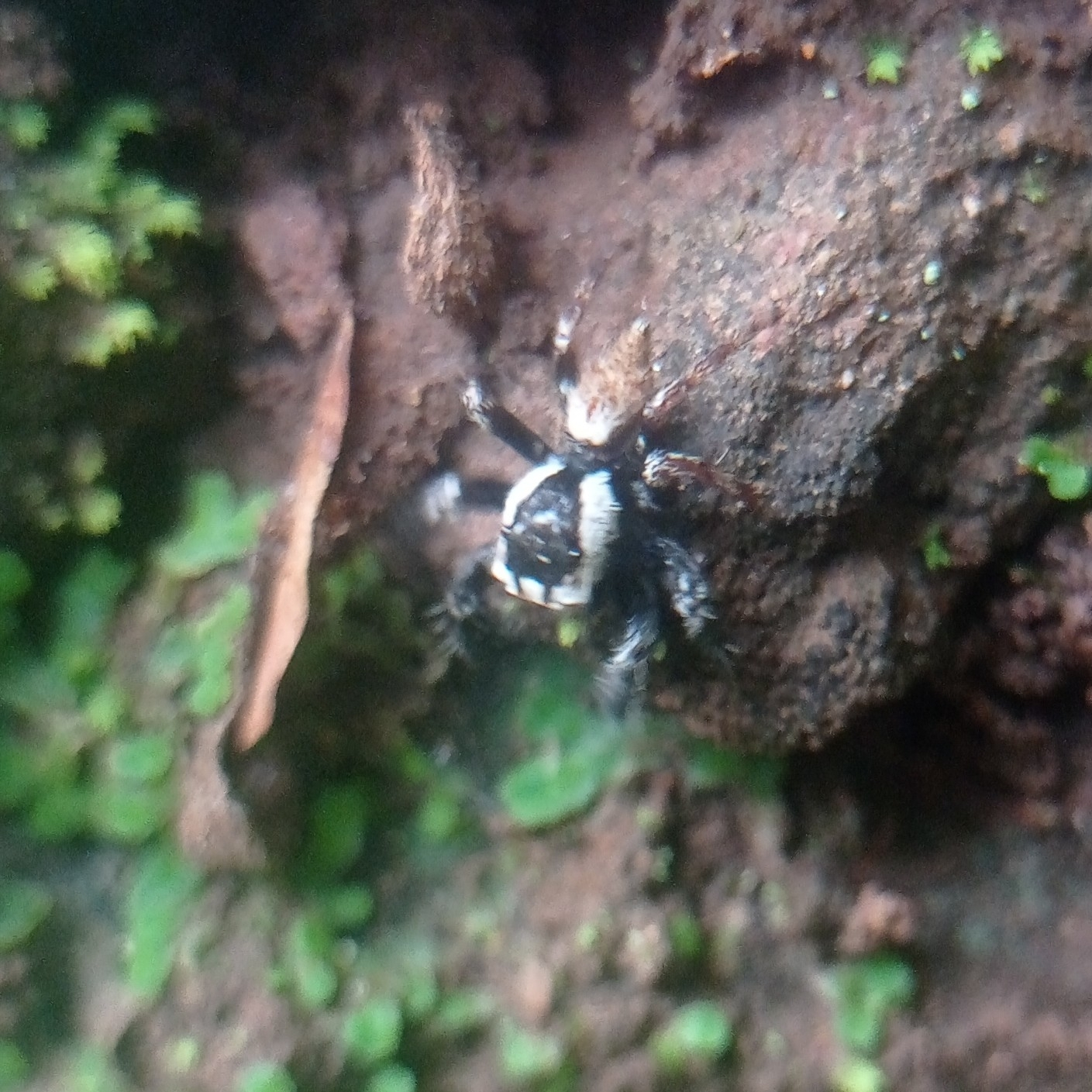

Scientific classification
- Kingdom: Animalia
- Phylum: Arthropoda
- Subphylum: Chelicerata
- Class: Arachnida
- Order: Araneae
- Infraorder: Araneomorphae
- Family: Salticidae
- Genus: Carrhotus
- Species: C. andhra

Binomial name
- Carrhotus andhra Caleb, 2020

= Carrhotus andhra =

Species of spider

Carrhotus andhra is a species of jumping spider in the family Salticidae. It is found in the Indian state of Andhra Pradesh, after which it is named.

== Description ==
The carapace is brownish, with three patches of white hairs along the anterior margin. Anterior eyes are surrounded by white orbital setae. The sternum is oval and yellowish-brown. The labium and maxillae are similarly colored. The legs are brownish in color. The abdomen is yellow-brown, with a pair of lateral brown longitudinal patches. The female is unknown.

Carrhotus andhra can be distinguished from similar species by the presence of a prolateral, knife-like protrusion of the tegulum and the RTA (Retrolateral tibial apophysis) bifurcated at its tip.
