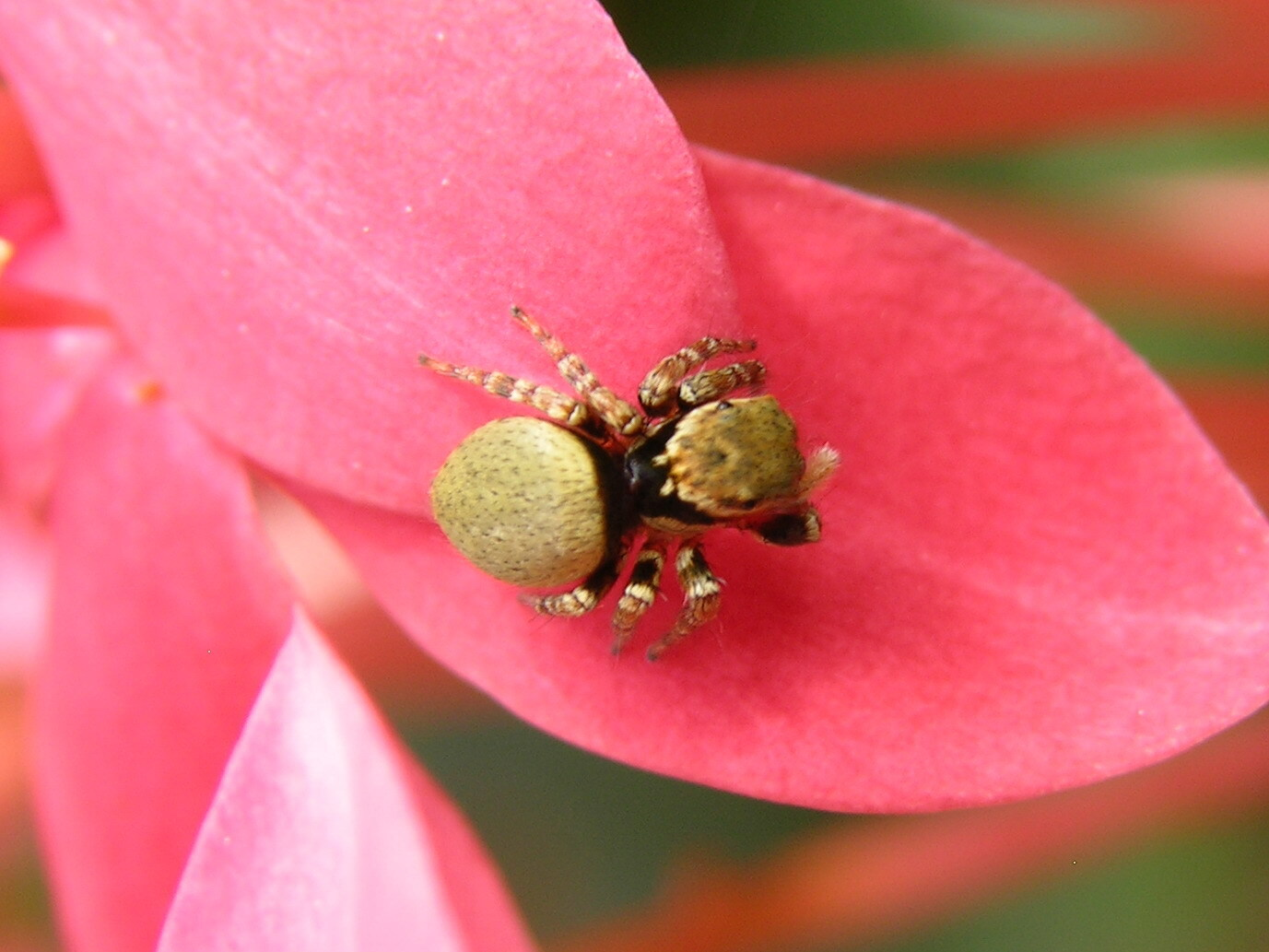
- female from Thailand
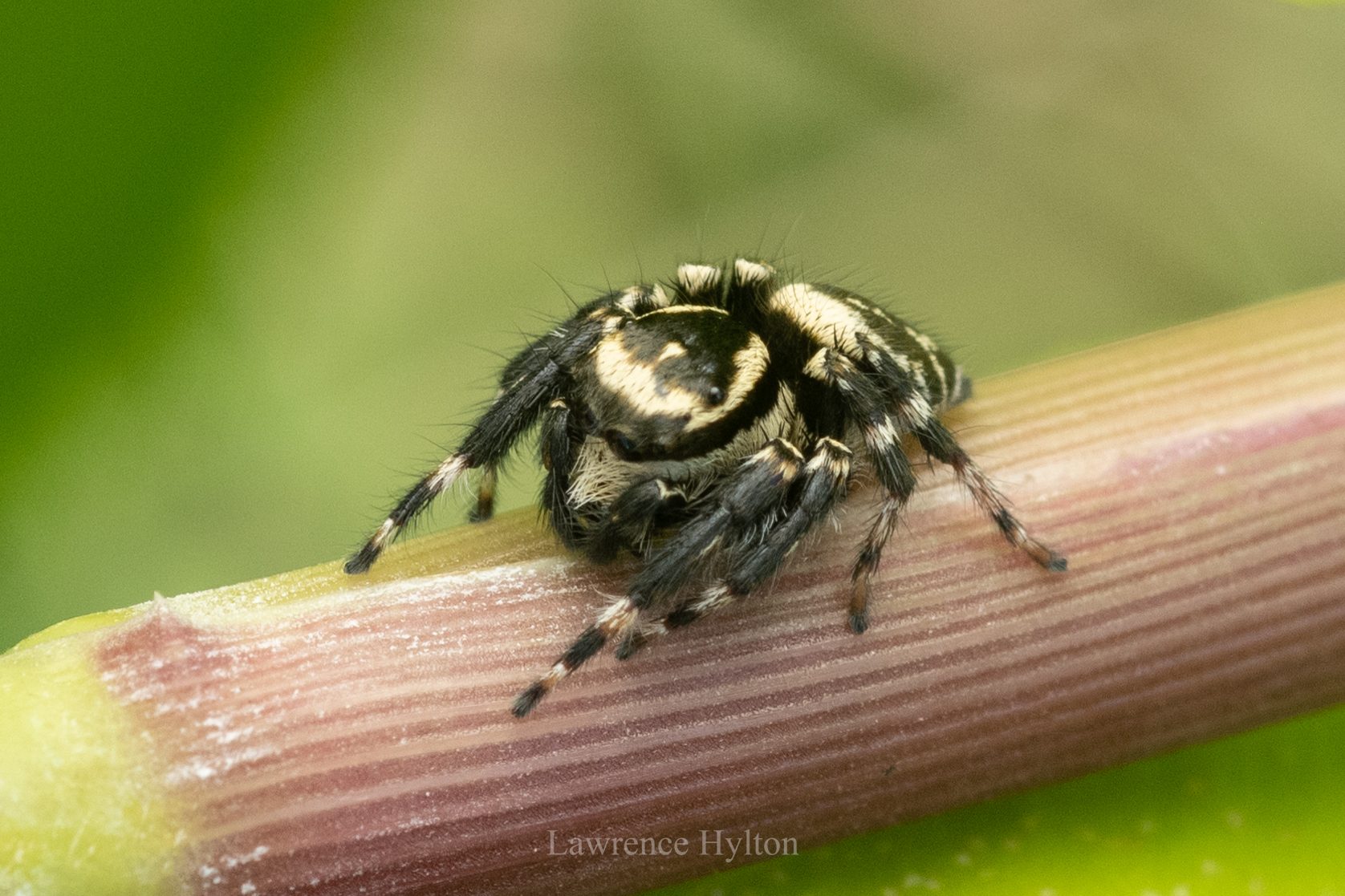
- male from Indonesia

Scientific classification
- Kingdom: Animalia
- Phylum: Arthropoda
- Subphylum: Chelicerata
- Class: Arachnida
- Order: Araneae
- Infraorder: Araneomorphae
- Family: Salticidae
- Genus: Carrhotus
- Species: C. sannio

Binomial name
- Carrhotus sannio (Thorell, 1877)

Synonyms
- Plexippus sannio Thorell, 1877; Hasarius coronatus Thorell, 1887 (misidentification); Hasarius virens Thorell, 1891; Hasarius sannio (Thorell, 1877); Ergane sannio (Thorell, 1877); Eugasmia sannio (Thorell, 1877); Bianor piratus Sen et al., 2015

= Carrhotus sannio =

Species of spider

Carrhotus sannio is a species of jumping spider in the family Salticidae. It is found across a wide range in Asia, from southern China to India, Indonesia and Guam.

== Taxonomy ==
The species was originally described by Tamerlan Thorell in 1877 as Plexippus sannio. It has undergone several taxonomic changes, being placed in various genera including Hasarius, Ergane, and Eugasmia before being transferred to Carrhotus by Prószyński in 1984.

In 2020, Caleb, Bera & Acharya synonymized Bianor piratus Sen et al., 2015 with C. sannio.

== Distribution ==
Carrhotus sannio has been recorded from Réunion, China, Nepal, India to Vietnam and Indonesia. The species appears to have a broad distribution across tropical and subtropical Asia.

== Description ==
Based on Thorell's original descriptions, the species shows marked sexual dimorphism in coloration and size.

The male, described in 1877, has a distinctive black cephalothorax with white marginal bands and olive-colored pubescence on the dorsal surface. The body length is approximately 5 mm. The legs are black with white markings and transverse bands. The abdomen is black with olive pubescence and distinctive white markings that include an anterior belt, two longitudinal median stripes, and posterior transverse patches.

The female, described by Thorell in 1891 as Hasarius virens, is notably different and larger, measuring about 5 mm in total length. The cephalothorax is black with greenish-yellow to olive pubescence covering most of the surface, becoming grayish at the lateral margins. The clypeus is densely covered with yellowish hairs and reddish pubescence at the sides. The abdomen is covered with dense greenish-yellow pubescence and is often marked with black spots, sometimes arranged in oblique patterns on the posterior sides. The legs are brownish-testaceous with darker annulations, and the femora are largely black above.
