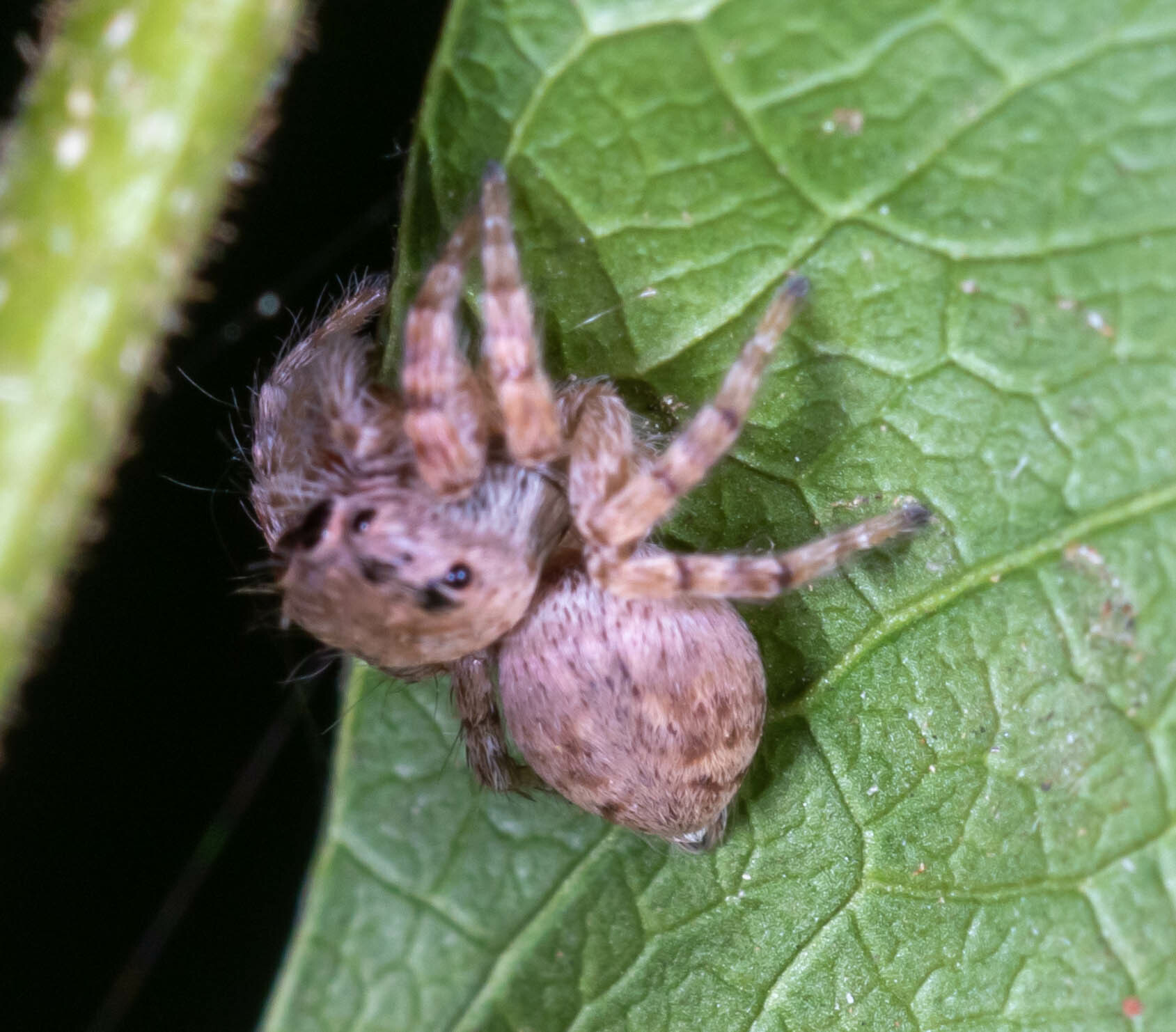
- Female from Thailand
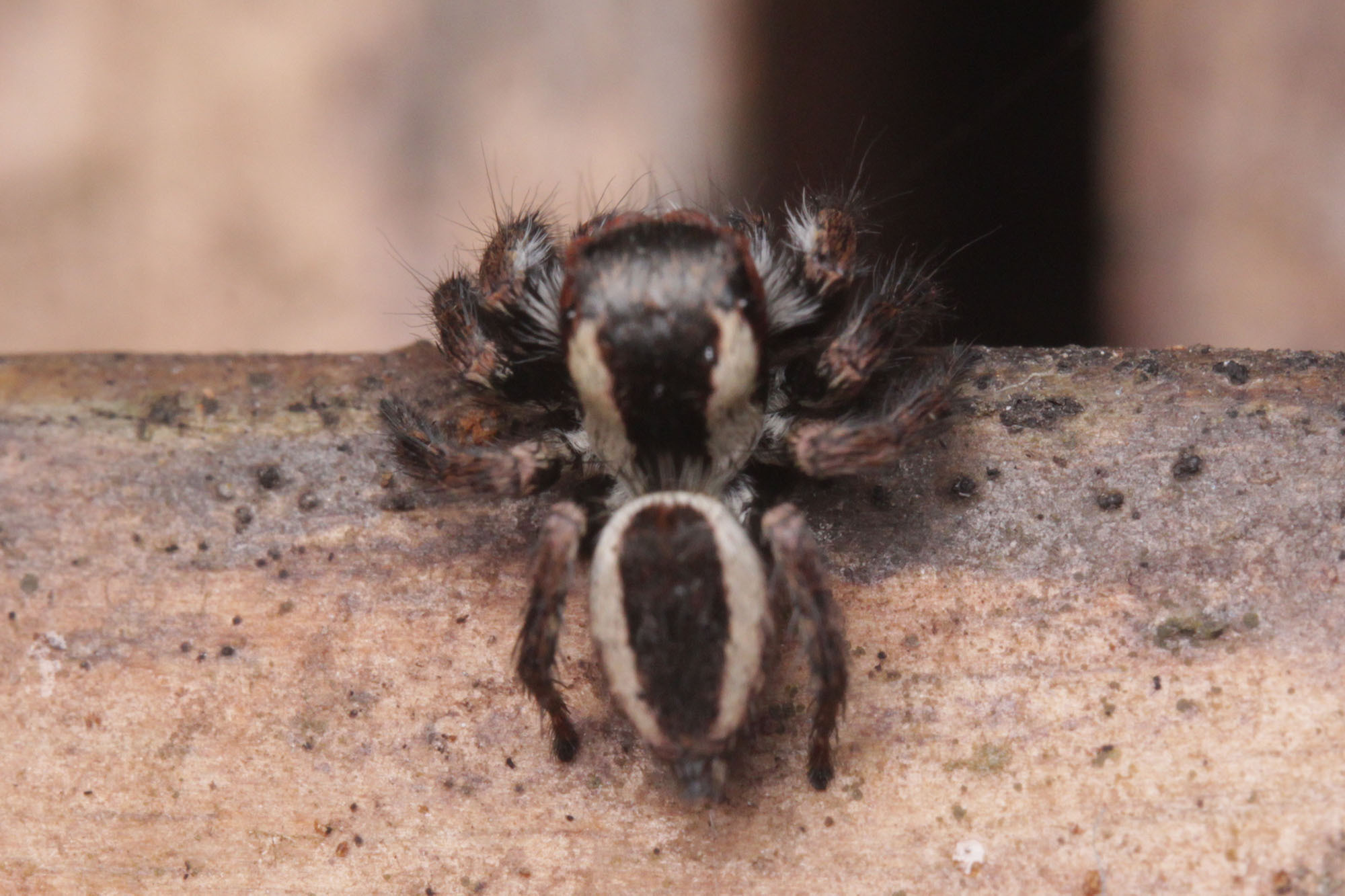
- Male from Indonesia

Scientific classification
- Kingdom: Animalia
- Phylum: Arthropoda
- Subphylum: Chelicerata
- Class: Arachnida
- Order: Araneae
- Infraorder: Araneomorphae
- Family: Salticidae
- Genus: Carrhotus
- Species: C. coronatus

Binomial name
- Carrhotus coronatus (Simon, 1885)

Synonyms
- Ergane coronata Simon, 1885; Eugasmia coronata Simon, 1903

= Carrhotus coronatus =

Species of jumping spider

Carrhotus coronatus is a species of jumping spider in the family Salticidae. It was first described by Eugène Simon in 1885 as Ergane coronata. The species is distributed across Southeast Asia, ranging from China and Vietnam to Indonesia (Java).

The specific name coronatus means "crowned" in Latin, referring to the crown-like white markings on the male's dark cephalothorax.

== Taxonomy ==
The species was originally described by Simon in 1885 under the name Ergane coronata based on male specimens. Simon later transferred it to the genus Eugasmia in 1903. The species was eventually placed in its current genus Carrhotus in 1985 by Marek Michał Żabka, who also provided the first description of the female.

== Distribution ==
C. coronatus has been recorded from several Southeast Asian countries including China, Vietnam, and Indonesia (specifically Java). The species appears to be primarily distributed in the Malay Archipelago region.

== Description ==
=== Male ===
The male of C. coronatus was described by Simon in 1885 from specimens collected in Sumatra. Males have a thick, black cephalothorax with bright marginal stripes and a narrow white band interrupted in the middle. The abdomen is elongated and black with a golden pubescent appearance, featuring two or four white spots at the front. The chelicerae are long and vertical with thick, erect yellow-white hairs in the front portion.

=== Female ===
The female has a distinctive coloration pattern that differs markedly from the male. The cephalothorax is orange-brown with a broad brown belt covered in numerous white hairs on the posterior and lateral surfaces. The eye region features yellow and orange setae along with brown bristles. The abdomen is grey-yellow with numerous brown hairs forming spots and dots, and white-yellow hairs creating large spots toward the posterior end.

The legs are orange and robust, covered with numerous protruding white and light brown long hairs, along with brown spines. The chelicerae and pedipalps are orange, with darker maxillae and labium, while the sternum appears yellow-orange.

Individual specimens may vary in coloration intensity and hair distribution patterns.
