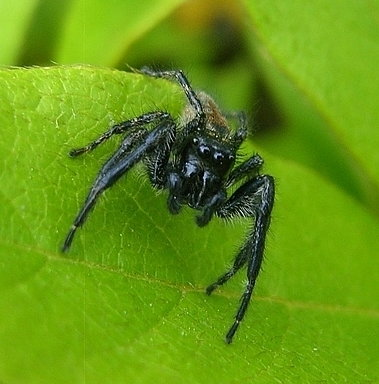
- Male C. xanthogramma
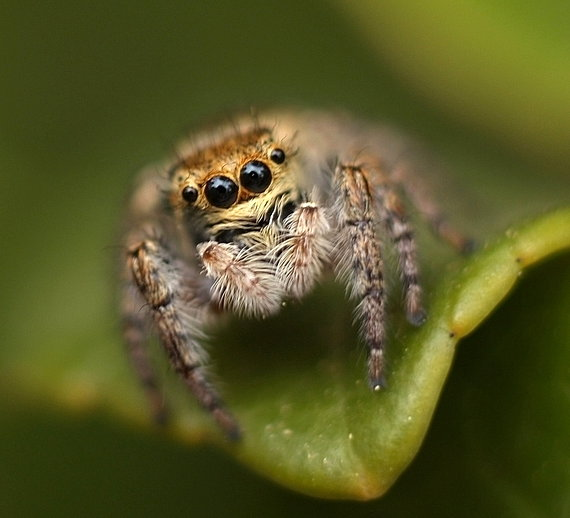
- Female C. xanthogramma

Scientific classification
- Kingdom: Animalia
- Phylum: Arthropoda
- Subphylum: Chelicerata
- Class: Arachnida
- Order: Araneae
- Infraorder: Araneomorphae
- Family: Salticidae
- Subfamily: Salticinae
- Genus: Carrhotus; Thorell, 1891

Type species
- C. viduus (C. L. Koch, 1846)

Species
- 35, see text

Synonyms
- Diagondas Simon, 1902; Eugasmia Simon, 1902

= Carrhotus =

Genus of spiders

Carrhotus is a genus of jumping spiders that was first described by Tamerlan Thorell in 1891. The name is derived from the Greek Κάῤῥωτος.

== Distribution ==
Spiders in this genus are found in Asia, Europe, and Africa, with one species described from Brazil.

== Species ==
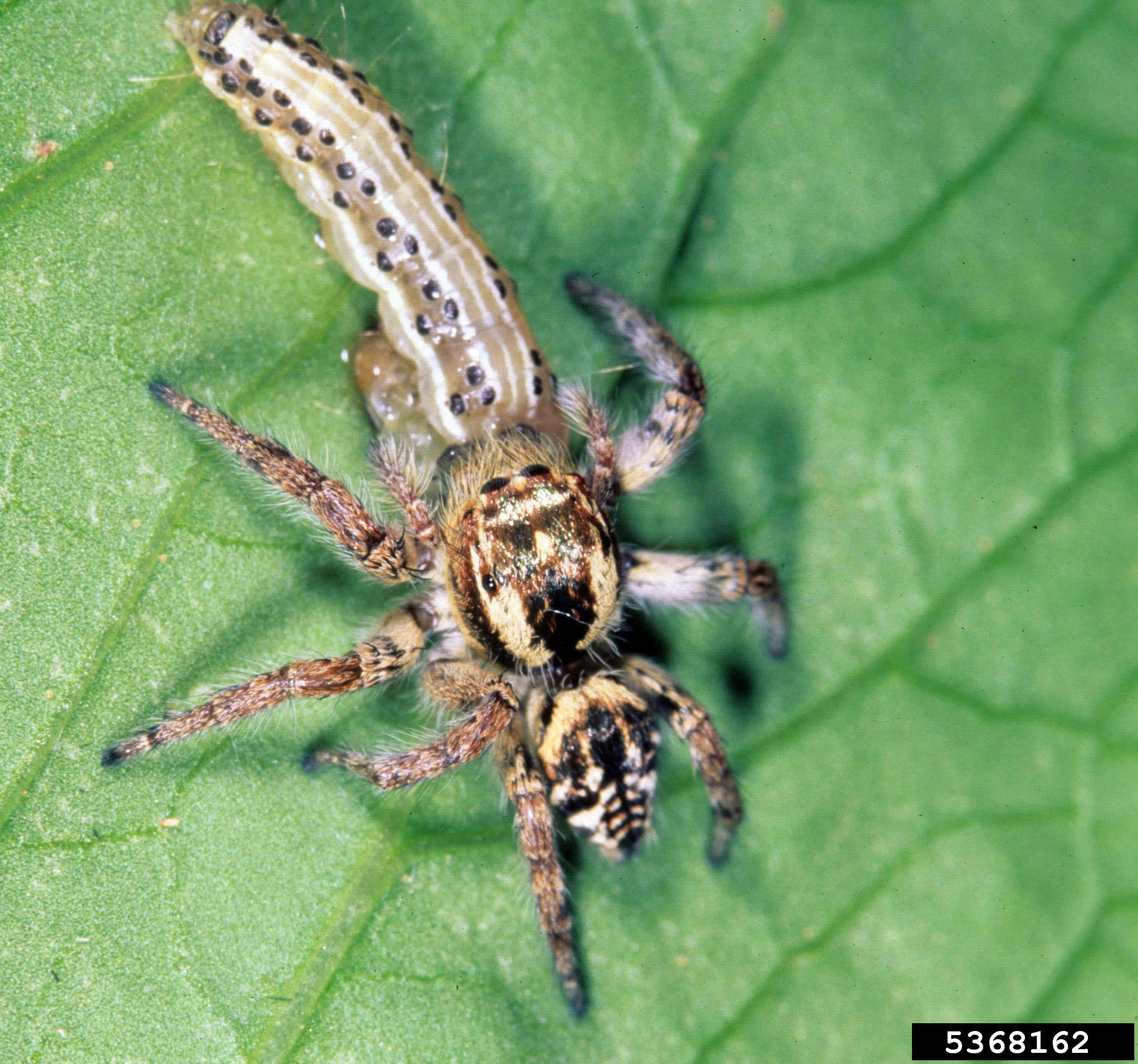
C. barbatus with prey

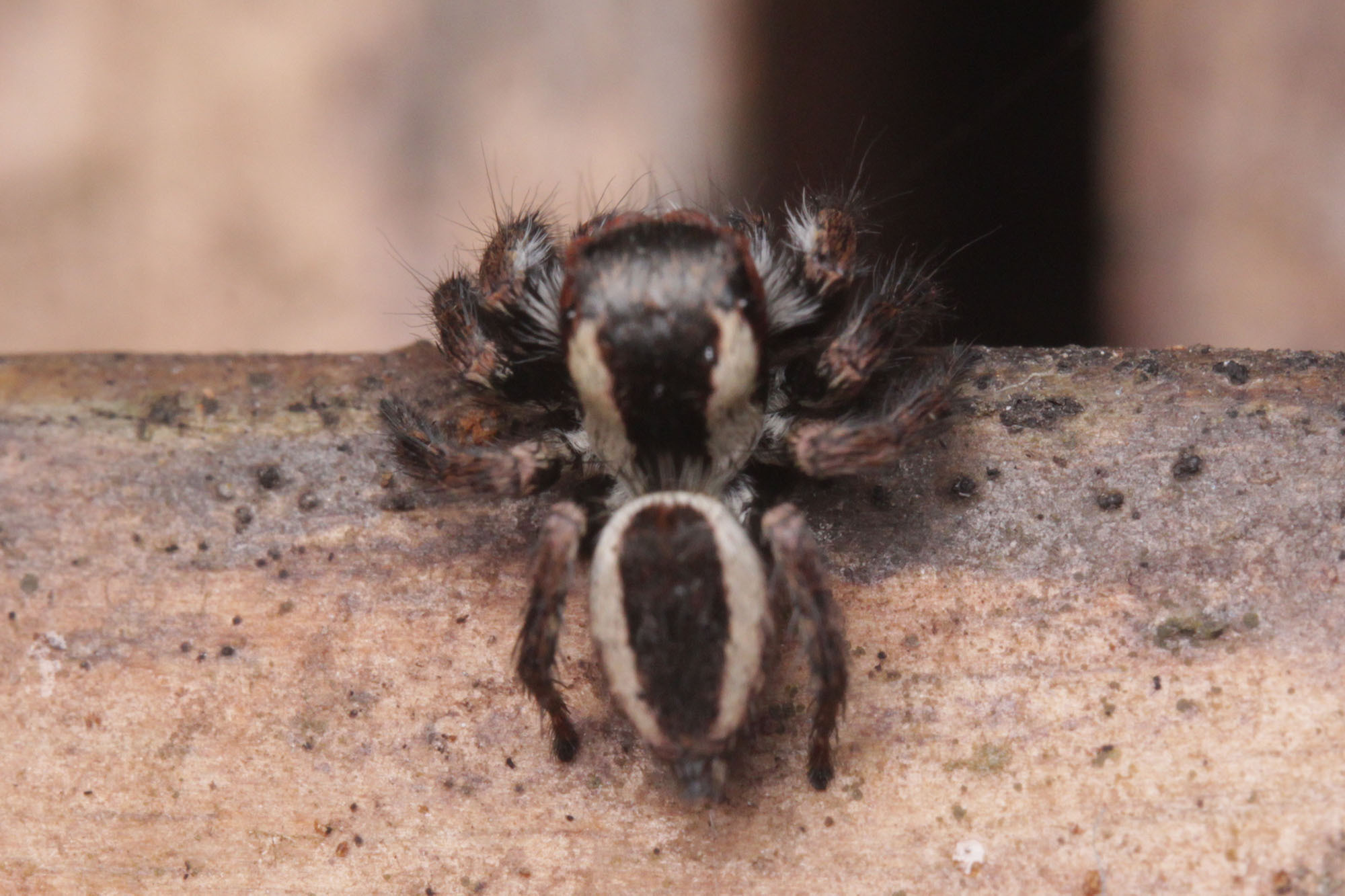
C. coronatus

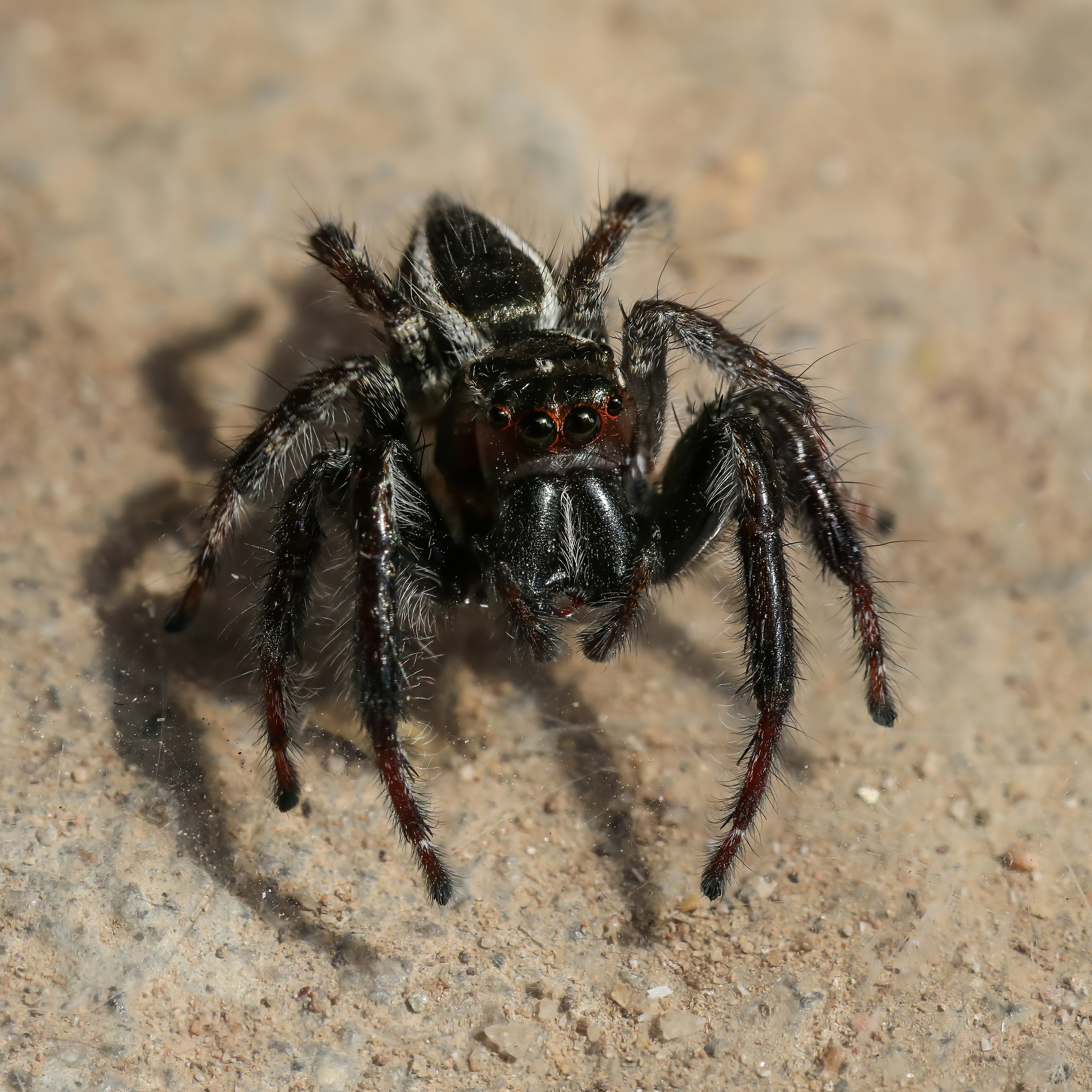
C. viduus

As of October 2025, this genus includes 35 species:

- Carrhotus affinis Caporiacco, 1934 – Libya
- Carrhotus albolineatus (C. L. Koch, 1846) – Indonesia (Java)
- Carrhotus albosetosus Satkunanathan & Benjamin, 2022 – Sri Lanka
- Carrhotus andhra Caleb, 2020 – India
- Carrhotus atratus Satkunanathan & Benjamin, 2022 – Sri Lanka
- Carrhotus barbatus (Karsch, 1880) – Philippines
- Carrhotus bellus Wanless, 1984 – Seychelles
- Carrhotus catagraphus Jastrzebski, 1999 – Nepal
- Carrhotus coronatus (Simon, 1885) – China, Vietnam to Indonesia (Java)
- Carrhotus erus Jastrzebski, 1999 – India, Nepal
- Carrhotus harringtoni Prószyński, 1992 – Madagascar
- Carrhotus kamjeensis Jastrzebski, 1999 – Bhutan
- Carrhotus lobatus Satkunanathan & Benjamin, 2022 – Sri Lanka
- Carrhotus malayanus Prószyński, 1992 – Malaysia
- Carrhotus occidentalis (Denis, 1947) – Egypt
- Carrhotus olivaceus (G. W. Peckham & E. G. Peckham, 1907) – Malaysia (Borneo)
- Carrhotus operosus Jastrzebski, 1999 – Nepal
- Carrhotus piperus Caleb & Sampathkumar, 2024 – India
- Carrhotus qingzhaoae Wang & Li, 2023 – China (Hainan)
- Carrhotus s-bulbosus Jastrzebski, 2009 – Nepal
- Carrhotus samchiensis Jastrzebski, 1999 – Bhutan
- Carrhotus sannio (Thorell, 1877) – Réunion, China, Nepal, India to Vietnam and Indonesia (Sulawesi)
- Carrhotus sarahcrewsae Cao & Li, 2016 – China
- Carrhotus scriptus Simon, 1902 – Gabon
- Carrhotus silanthi Caleb, 2020 – India, Sri Lanka
- Carrhotus singularis Simon, 1902 – South Africa
- Carrhotus spiridonovi Logunov, 2021 – India
- Carrhotus subaffinis Caporiacco, 1947 – Ethiopia
- Carrhotus sundaicus Prószyński & Deeleman-Reinhold, 2010 – Indonesia (Lombok)
- Carrhotus taprobanicus Simon, 1902 – Sri Lanka
- Carrhotus tholpettyensis Sudhin, Nafin, Caleb & Sudhikumar, 2021 – India
- Carrhotus tristis Thorell, 1895 – India, Myanmar, Taiwan
- Carrhotus viduus (C. L. Koch, 1846) – Iran, India, Sri Lanka, Nepal, Bangladesh, China, Vietnam (type species)
- Carrhotus viridiaureus (Simon, 1902) – Brazil
- Carrhotus xanthogramma (Latreille, 1819) – Europe, Turkey, Caucasus, Russia (Europe to Far East), China, Korea, Japan
