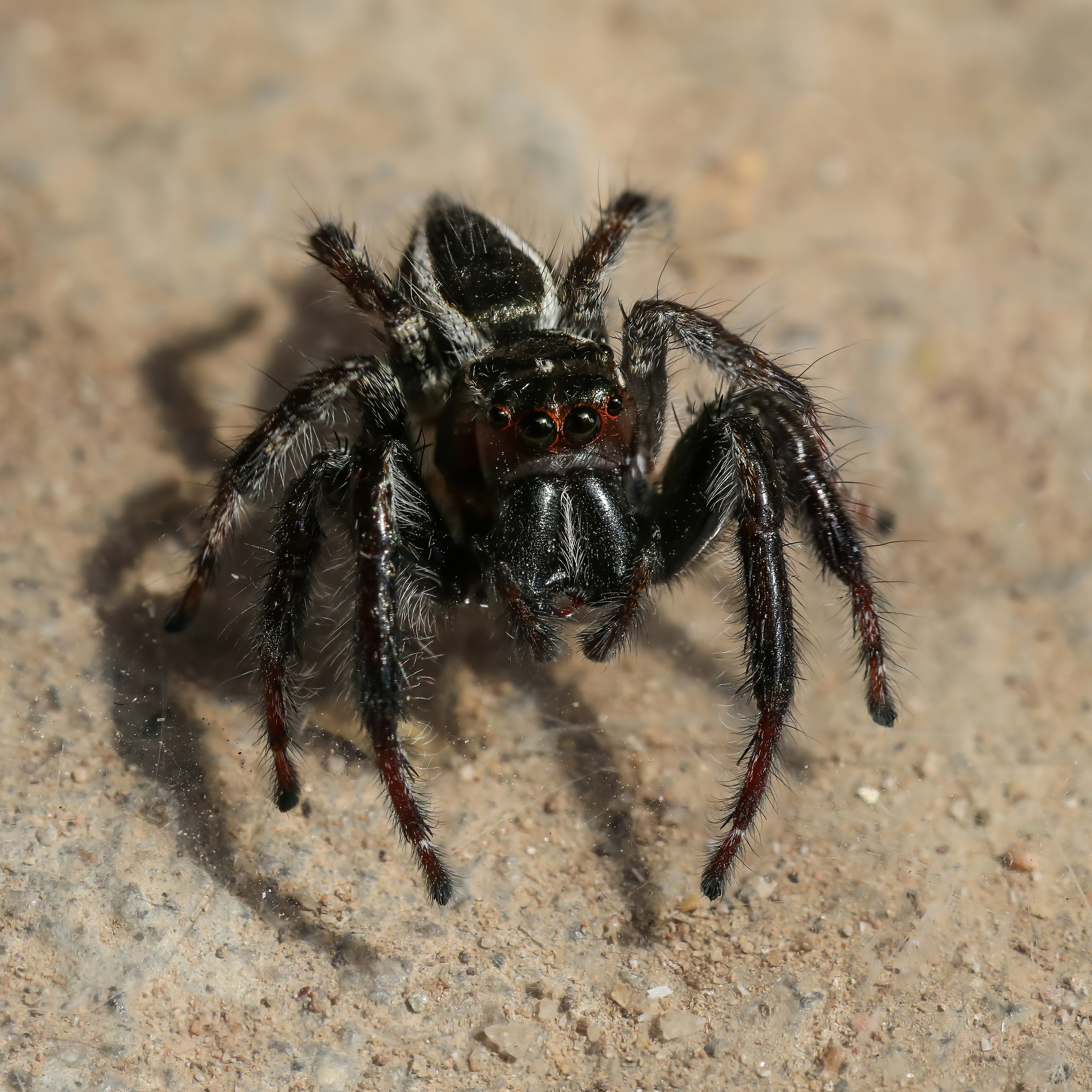
- Male
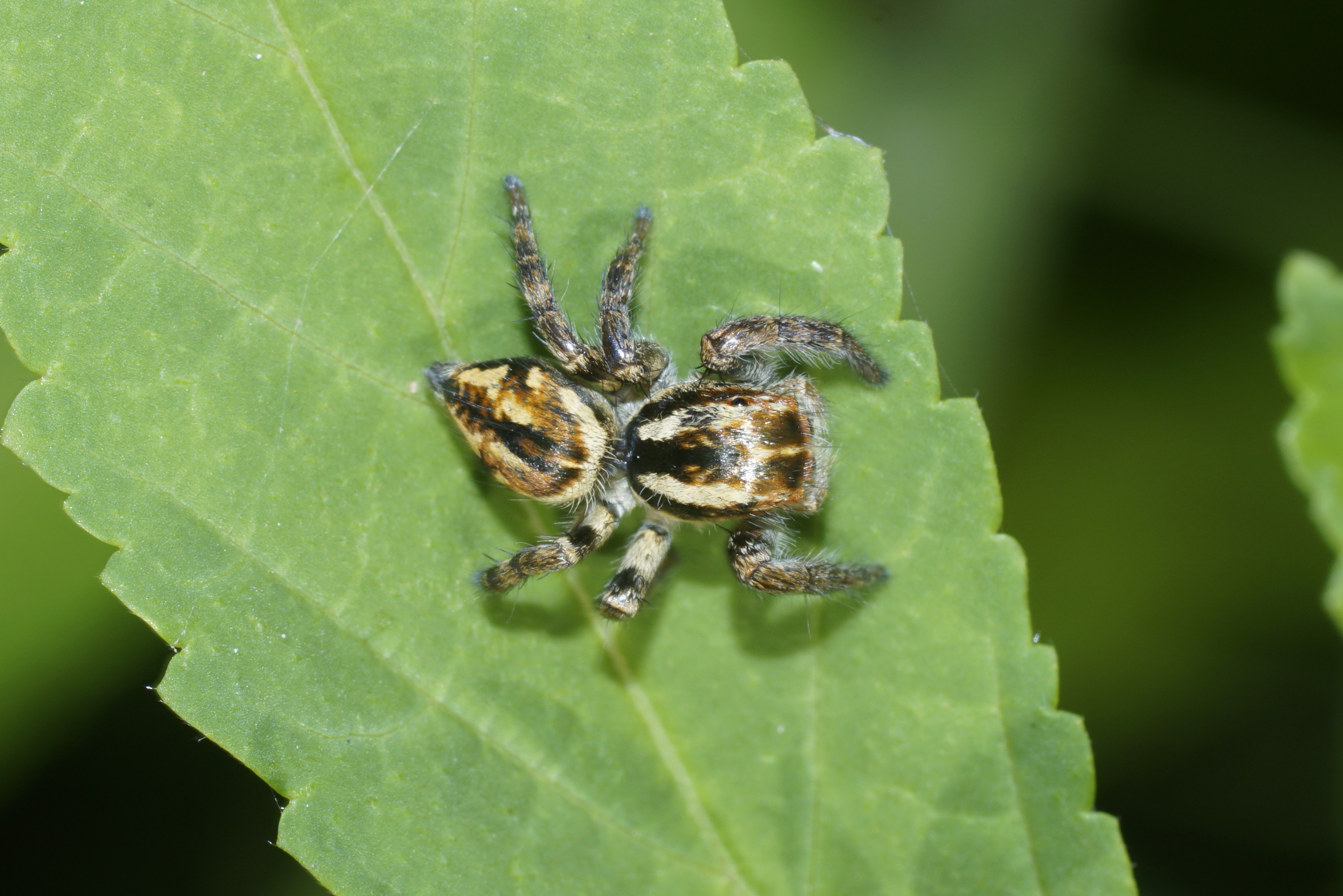
- Female

Scientific classification
- Kingdom: Animalia
- Phylum: Arthropoda
- Subphylum: Chelicerata
- Class: Arachnida
- Order: Araneae
- Infraorder: Araneomorphae
- Family: Salticidae
- Genus: Carrhotus
- Species: C. viduus

Binomial name
- Carrhotus viduus C. L. Koch (1846)

Synonyms
- Carrhotus gajbei (Karthikeyani & Kannan, 2013); Carrhotus ornatus (Simon, 1885); Attus viduus (Walckenaer,1847); Hyllus morgani (Simon,1885); Mogrus ornatus (Simon, 1885); Plexippus viduus (C.L.Koch, 1846); Plexippus cumulatus (Karsch 1892); Marpissa lakshmikantapurensis (Majumder, 2004); Marpissa decorata (Tikader, 1974); Marpissa tikaderi (Biswas, 1984); Plexippus lakshmikantapurensis (Majumder, 2004); Plexippus decorata (Tikader, 1974); Plexippus tikaderi (Biswas, 1984)

= Carrhotus viduus =

Species of spider

Carrhotus viduus is a species of spider in the family Salticidae. It is found in South and Southeast Asia. It is the type species of the genus Carrhotus.

== Description ==
The male is black, with two thick white stripes running along either side of the head. Another two stripes run along the abdomen, and it doesn't meet at the abdomen tip. It has a slightly iridescent maroon 'face' and a small white spot on the 'forehead'. Its eyes have an orange border.

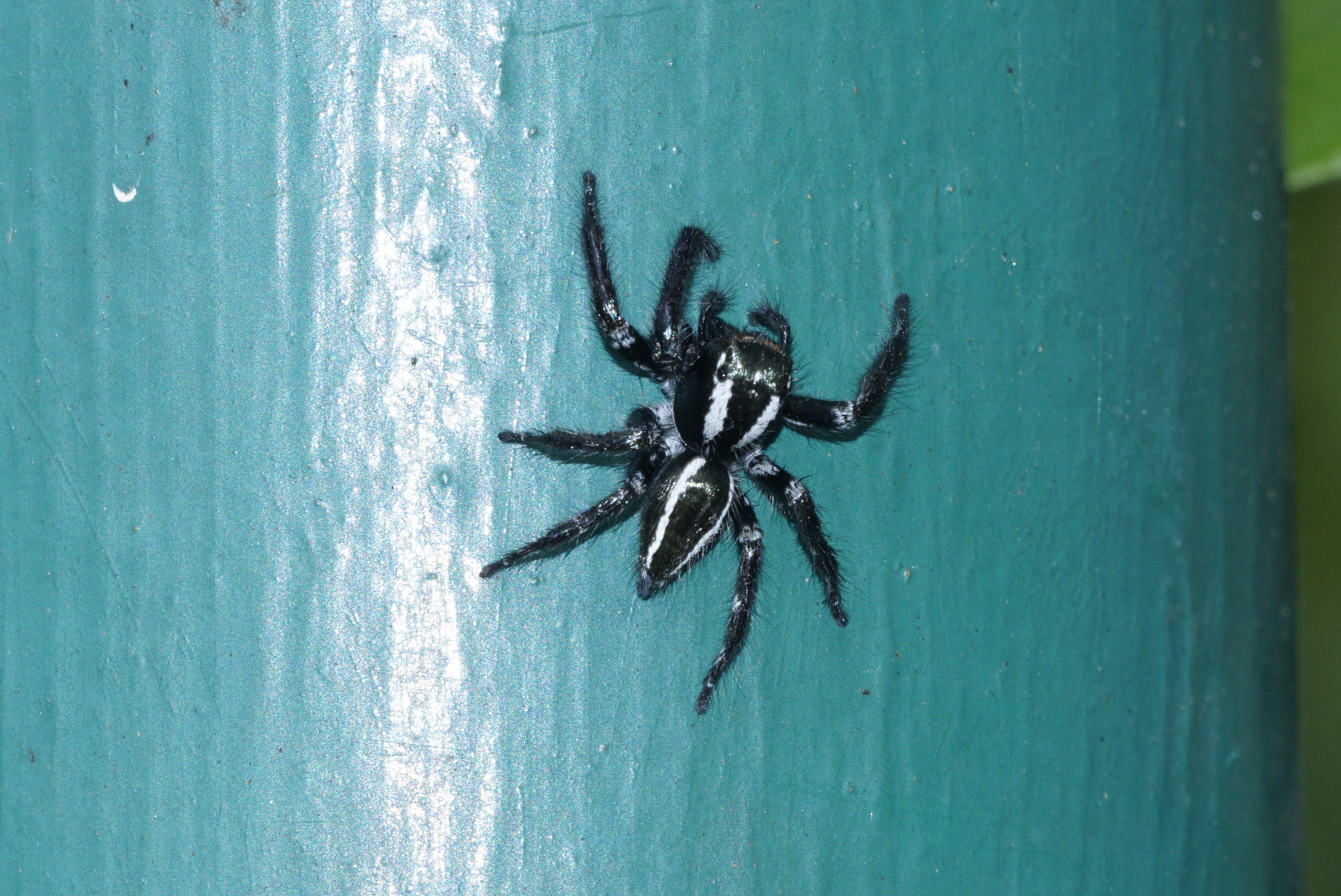
Top view of male

The female has an overall orange color, with various yellow and orange markings along its abdomen. The cephalothorax is red and brown, with horizontal white streaks under the eyes.

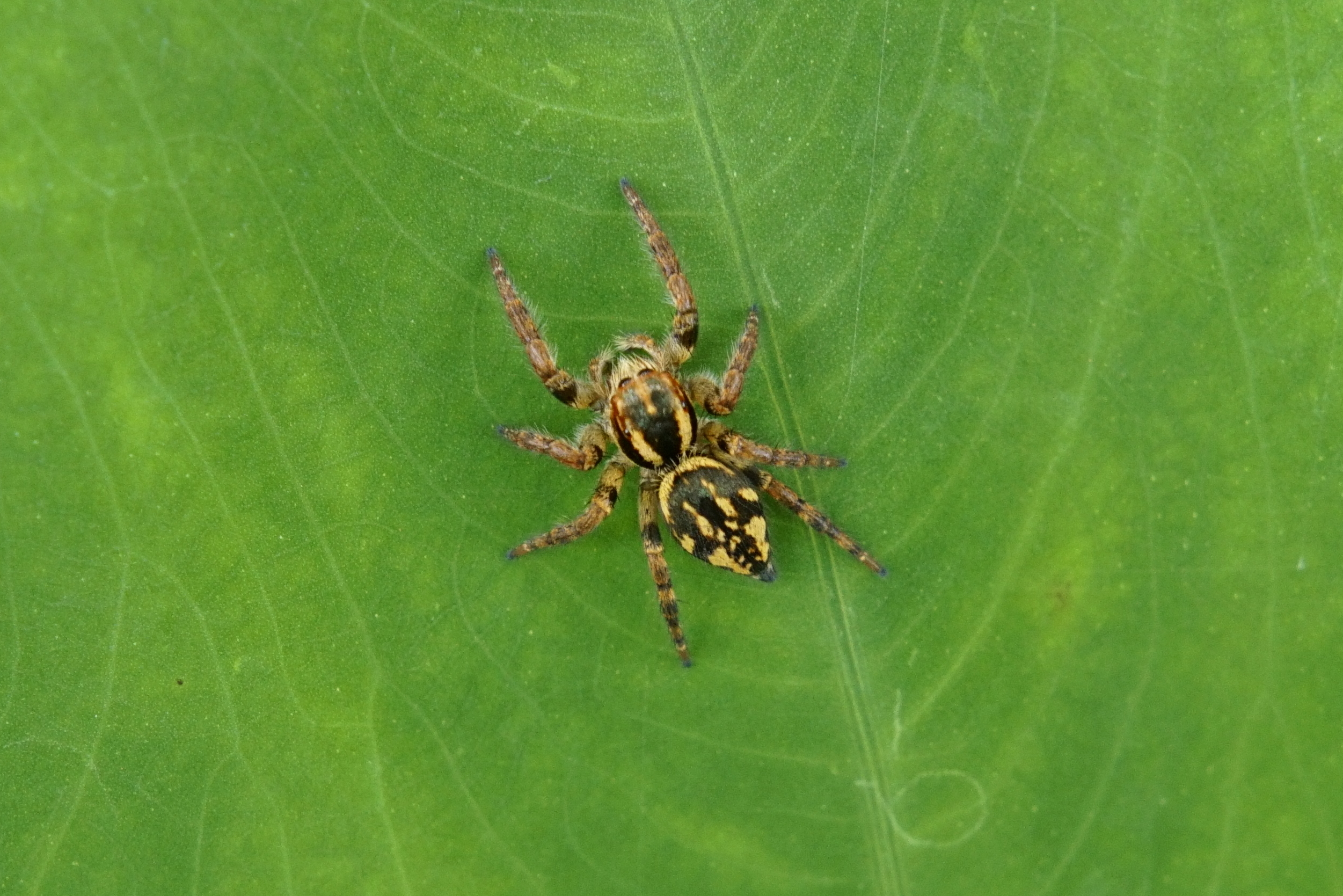
Top view of female

The head and cephalothorax of both sexes is longer than its width. Its abdomen is large near the base but kinks inward into a cone. They have black hairs on their legs and white hairs on the abdomen. The spinnerets (silk-producing organs) are clearly visible at the end of their abdomen.

== Range ==
It is found in from Sri Lanka and India east to China, Myanmar, Vietnam and there have been some unconfirmed reports from Japan and the Sundas.

== Behaviour and ecology ==
It normally moves quickly, and can actively and suddenly jump in an escape.

=== Habitat ===
It is found in tropical and subtropical woodlands, including gardens, preferring thick foliage of short trees and shrubs.

== Taxonomic history ==
The species was first described as Plexippus viduus by Carl Ludwig Koch in 1846 and moved to genus Carrhotus by in 1999. Then, a new species of Plexippus, Plexippus gajbei , got published, but although the paper mentioned a female and male holotype, the female was never deposited and the male was determined to be C. viduus. In 2020, Marpissa lakshmikantapurensis, Marpissa tikaderi and Marpissa decorata was also synonymized with C. viduus.
