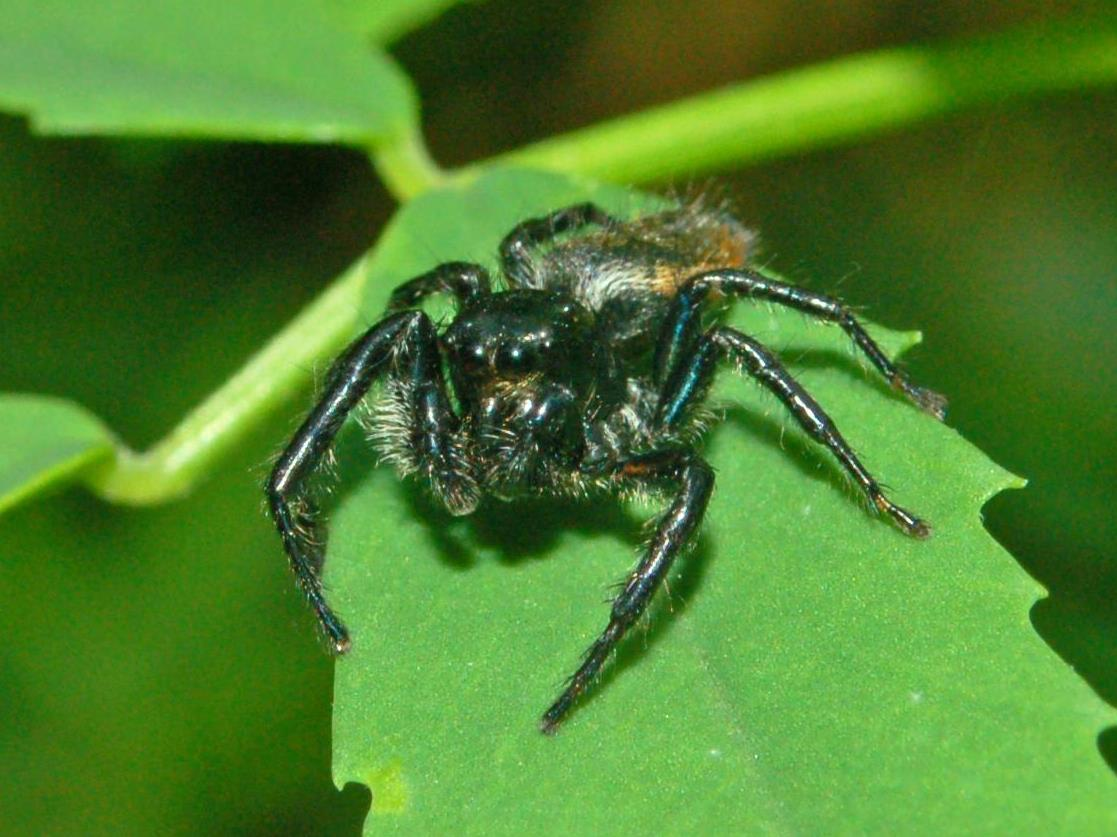
- Carrhotus xanthogramma, male
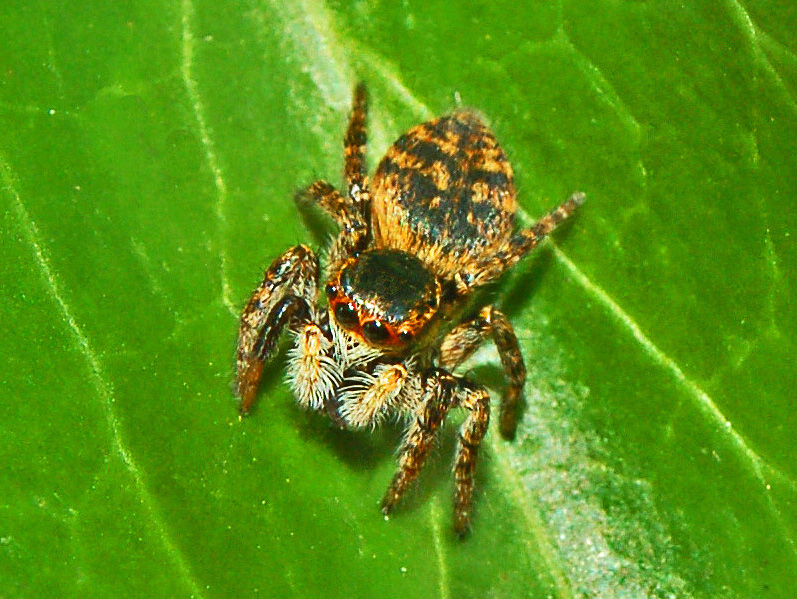
- Female

Scientific classification
- Kingdom: Animalia
- Phylum: Arthropoda
- Subphylum: Chelicerata
- Class: Arachnida
- Order: Araneae
- Infraorder: Araneomorphae
- Family: Salticidae
- Genus: Carrhotus
- Species: C. xanthogramma

Binomial name
- Carrhotus xanthogramma (Latreille, 1819)

Synonyms
- List: Aranea bicolor Walckenaer, 1802 nec Olivier, 1789; Salticus xanthogramma Latreille, 1819; Dendryphantes mucidus C. L. Koch, 1846; Attus varicus Simon, 1868; Attus lanipes Simon, 1871; Hasarius crinitus Karsch, 1879; Carrhotus detritus Bösenberg & Strand, 1906; Dendryphantes rubrosquamulatus Dönitz & Strand, 1906; Carrhotus pichoni Schenkel, 1963

= Carrhotus xanthogramma =

Species of spider

Carrhotus xanthogramma is a species of jumping spider belonging to the family Salticidae.

== Distribution ==
Its distribution is palearctic, including a portion of Europe (Portugal, Spain, France, Great Britain, Ireland, Germany, Poland, Hungary, Austria, Switzerland, Italy, Slovenia, Croatia, Bosnia and Herzegovina, Serbia, North Macedonia, Romania, Bulgaria and Greece), in Turkey, Caucasus, Azerbaijan, Afghanistan, Russia, China, Mongolia, South Korea and Japan.

== Habitat ==
These thermophilic spiders prefer sunny, warm environments. They can mainly be encountered on bushes, on tree trunks and shrubbery.

== Description ==
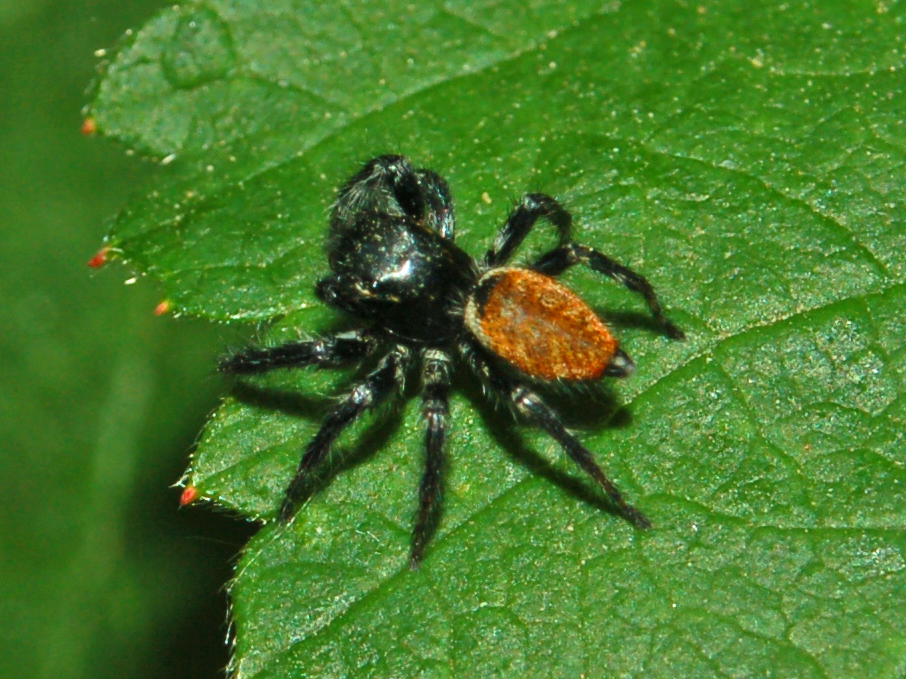
Male, dorsal view

The adult males of these jumping spiders reach approximately 5.1–7.1 millimetres (0.20–0.28 in) of length, while females can reach a body length of about 7.1–9.0 millimetres (0.28–0.35 in). These spiders are covered with dense hair. The sexual dimorphism of this species is pronounced.

The males are smaller than females. They have a black bright cephalothorax (prosoma) and a hairy, flattened and tapered, reddish-orange abdomen (opisthosoma). The separation between cephalothorax (prosoma) and abdomen (opisthosoma) is well marked. Their black legs may have slightly orange rings. Palps are black haired.

The female's body, according to the mimicry strategy, is mostly brownish, with dark brown markings. There is a yellowish area on a blackish front head, that includes an arcuate bandage extending from one side-eye to the other, encircling the entire back of the fore-body.

The abdomen is oval and slightly tapered. It is predominantly yellowish, with narrow, dark brownish longitudinal V-shaped stripes and spots. Legs are light-dark annulated. Palps are light brown with long white hairs. They have eight eyes with very large anterior median eyes.

== Biology ==
Adults can be found in spring and summer, from April to July. They actively pursue their prey, jumping on them. Their eyesight is excellent and very useful in their way of hunting.

== Gallery ==
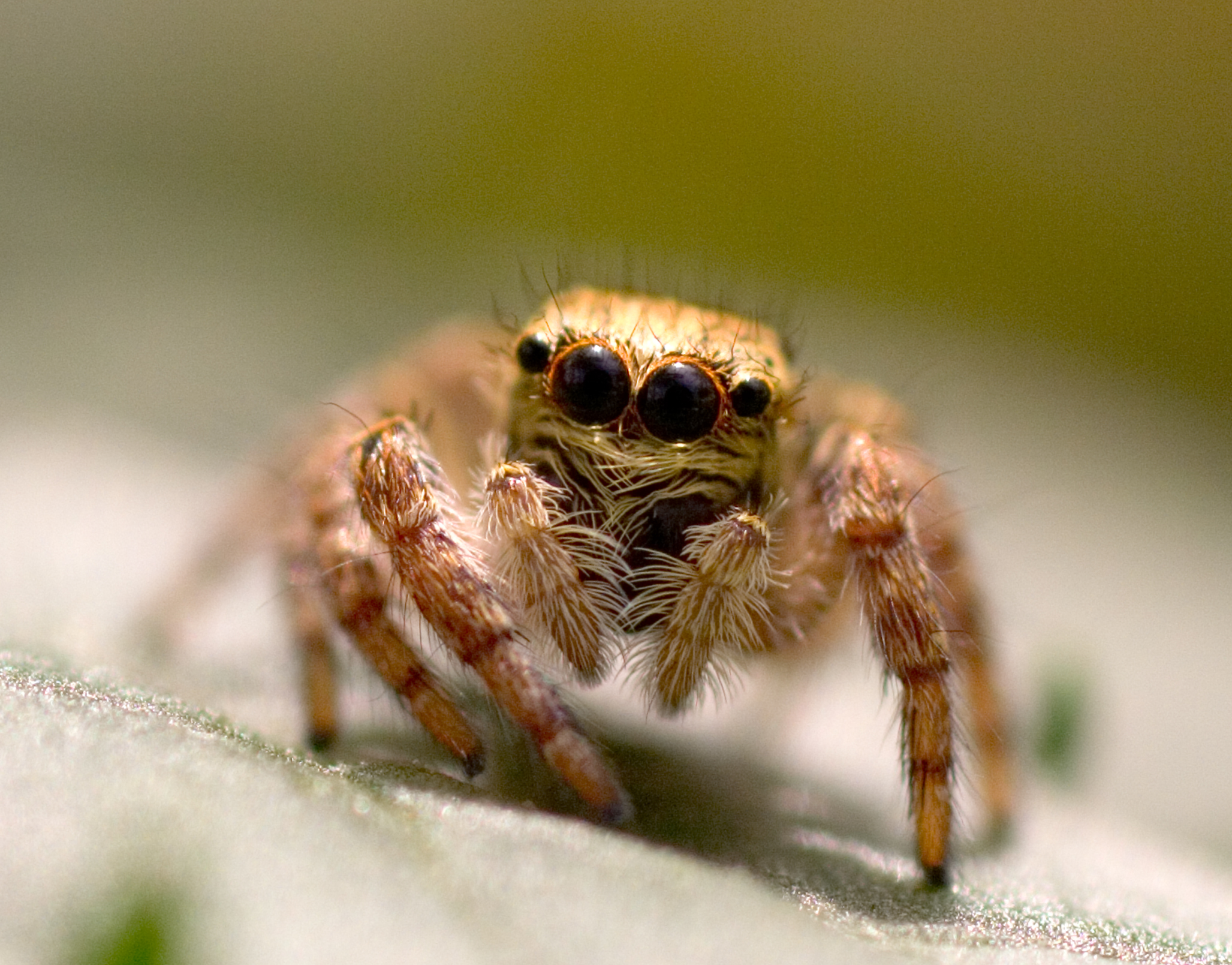
Female, front view

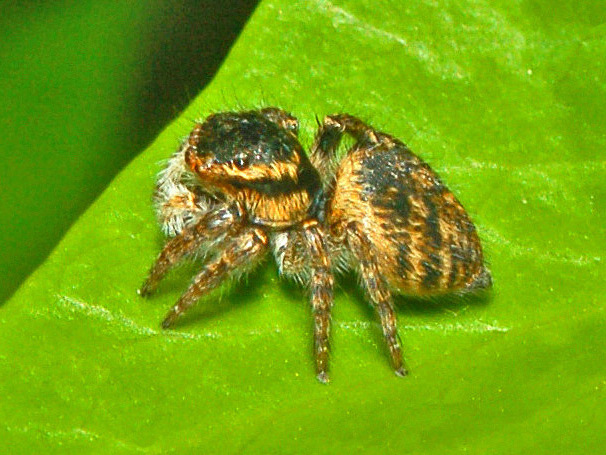
Female. Side view

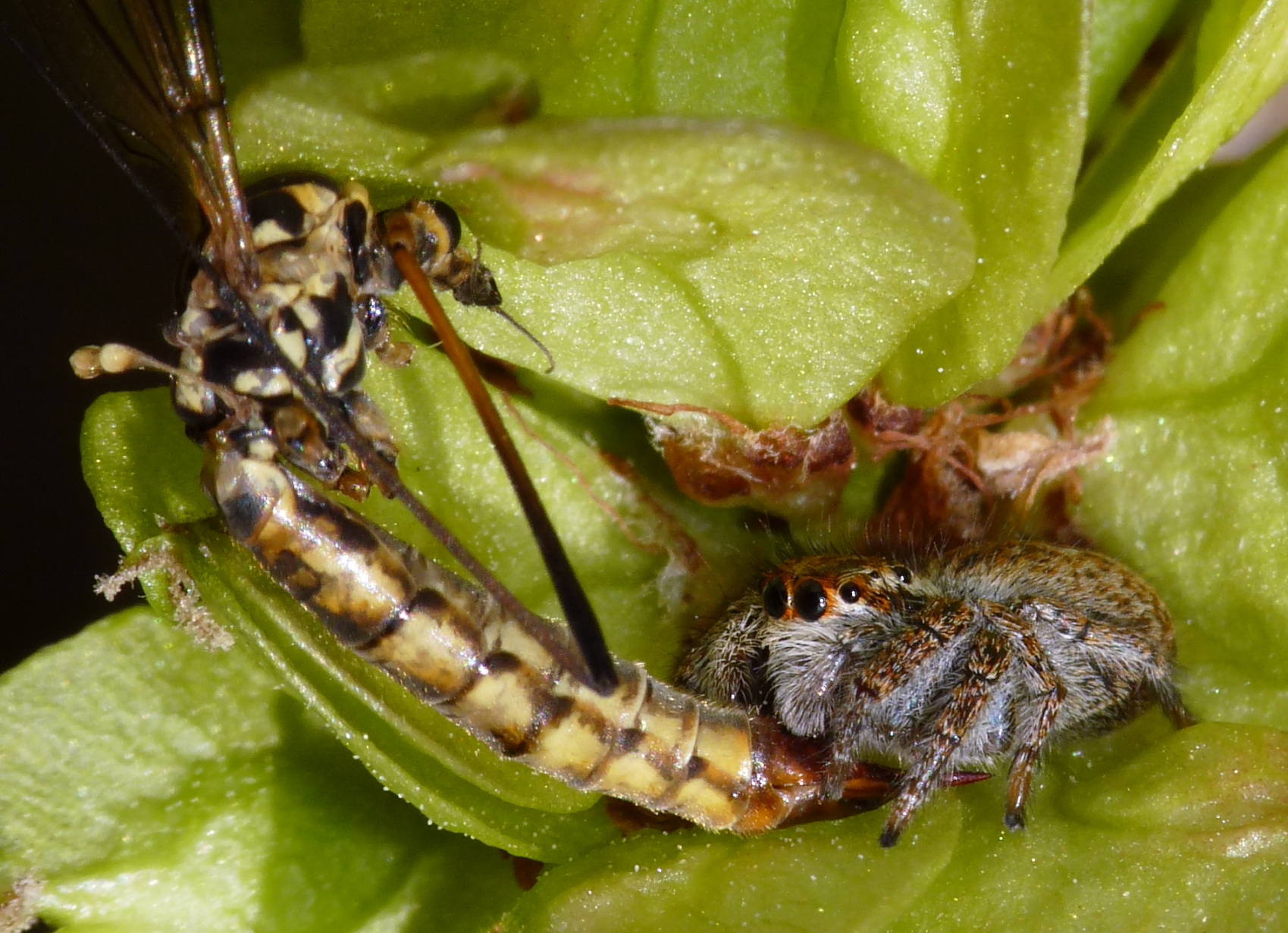
Female preys a Tipulidae species

Male and female (video, 3 min 41 s)

== Bibliography ==
- Forster, L.M. (1982) - Vision and prey-catching strategies in jumping spiders - American Scientist 70: 165-175.
- Fang WY, Wang ZL, Li C, Yang XQ, Yu XP - The complete mitogenome of a jumping spider Carrhotus xanthogramma (Araneae: Salticidae) and comparative analysis in four salticid mitogenomes. doi:10.1007/s10709-016-9936-8 PMID 27822711
- Heiko Bellmann: Der Kosmos Spinnenführer. Über 400 Arten Europas (= Kosmos Naturführer). Kosmos, Stuttgart 2010, ISBN 978-3-440-10114-8, S. 294.
- Latreille, P. A. Articles sur les araignées. N. Dict. hist. nat. Paris. Ed. II, Paris, 22.
- Maekawa, T. & Ikeda, H. (1992). Sexual behavior of a gynandromorphic spider of Carrhotus xanthogramma (Araneae: Salticidae). Acta Arachnologica 41: 103-108
