= Thrigmopoeus insignis =

Conservation status
- Vulnerable (IUCN 3.1)

Scientific classification
- Kingdom: Animalia
- Phylum: Arthropoda
- Subphylum: Chelicerata
- Class: Arachnida
- Order: Araneae
- Infraorder: Mygalomorphae
- Family: Theraphosidae
- Genus: Thrigmopoeus
- Species: T. insignis

Binomial name
- Thrigmopoeus insignis Pocock, 1899

Species of tarantula

Thrigmopoeus insignis is a species of tarantula spider endemic to India.

== Description ==
A tarantula spider of 55 mm length, it has black body with yellow-brown hair on the top and velvet-black below.

== Distribution ==
It was described from the Western Ghats of Karnataka within a 2000 km^{2} region due to which the IUCN assigned vulnerable status to the species.
