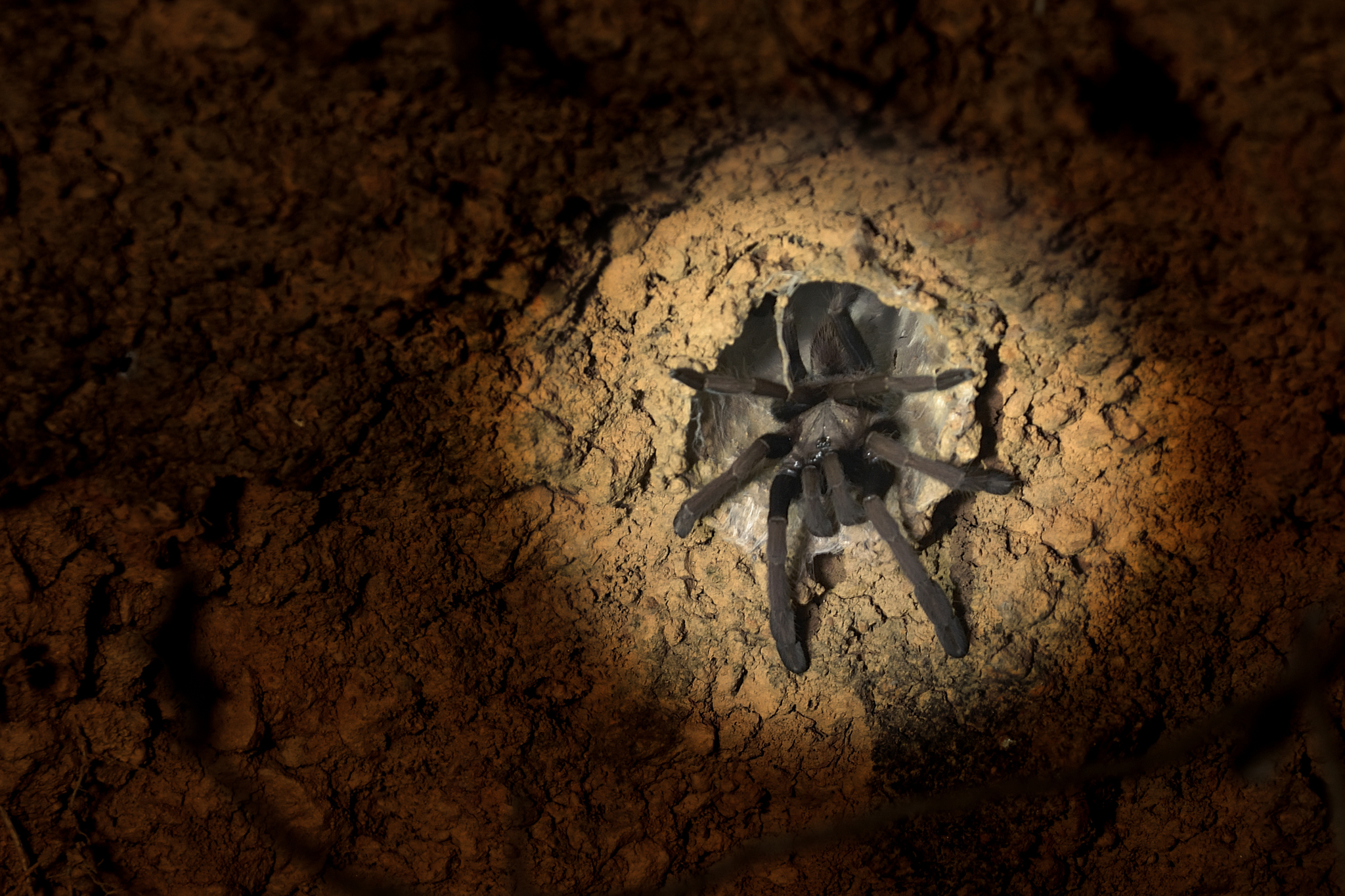
- Individual inside its burrow from Uttara Kannada, Karnataka.

Conservation status
- Near Threatened (IUCN 3.1)

Scientific classification
- Kingdom: Animalia
- Phylum: Arthropoda
- Subphylum: Chelicerata
- Class: Arachnida
- Order: Araneae
- Infraorder: Mygalomorphae
- Family: Theraphosidae
- Genus: Thrigmopoeus
- Species: T. truculentus

Binomial name
- Thrigmopoeus truculentus Pocock, 1899

= Thrigmopoeus truculentus =

Species of tarantula

Thrigmopoeus truculentus is a species of Indian tarantula found in the Western Ghats. It is also known as the Karwar large burrowing spider, Karwar burrowing spider and lesser Goa mustard tarantula.

== Range ==
Thrigmopoeus truculentus is endemic to the Western Ghats region, specifically Karnataka, Goa, Maharashtra. It has been recorded from vertical bunds along the roads and trek paths in Coorg as well as other locations in Goa, Maharashtra and Karnataka.

== Habitat and ecology ==
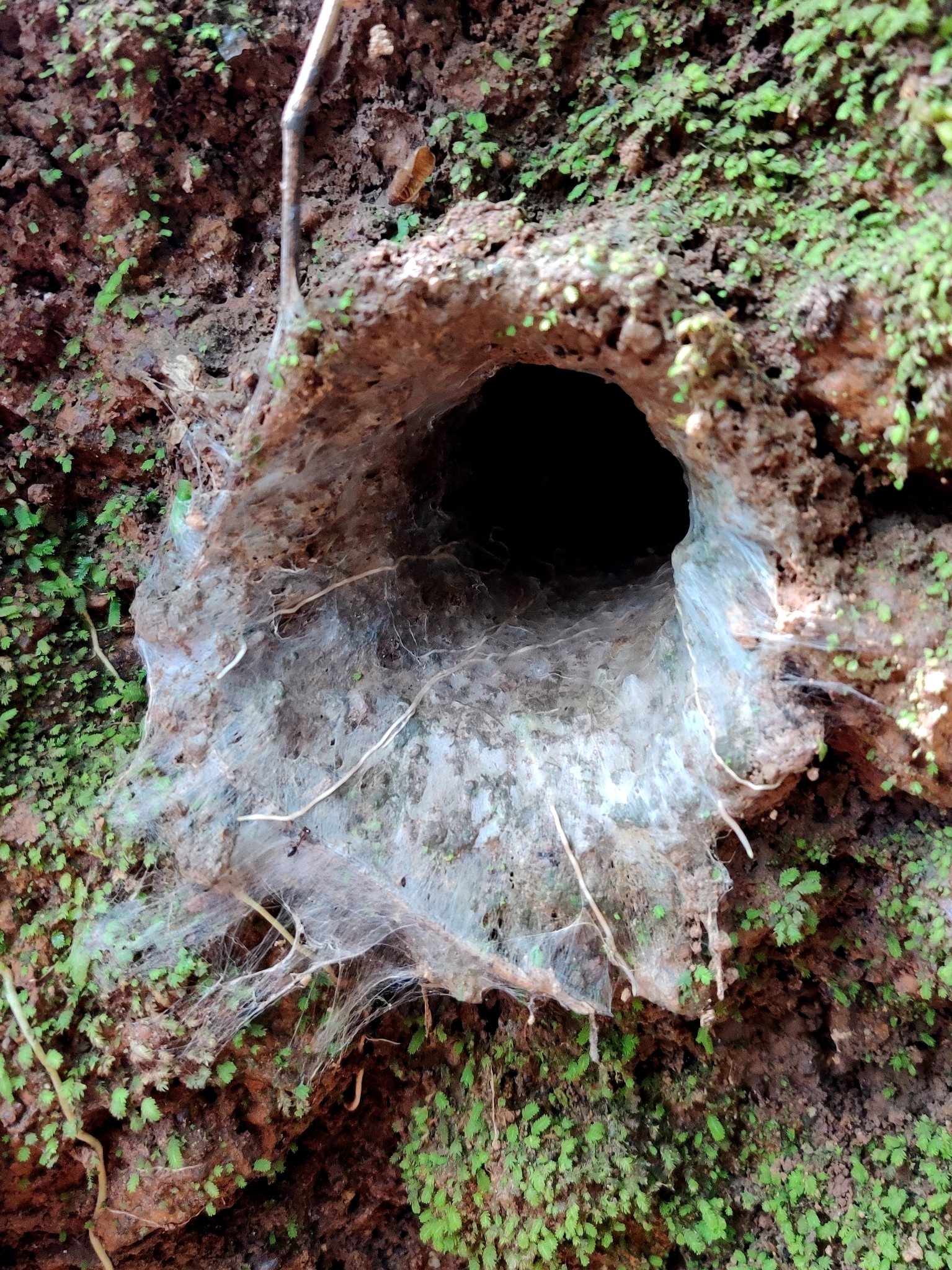
Burrow of Thrigmopoeus truculentus.

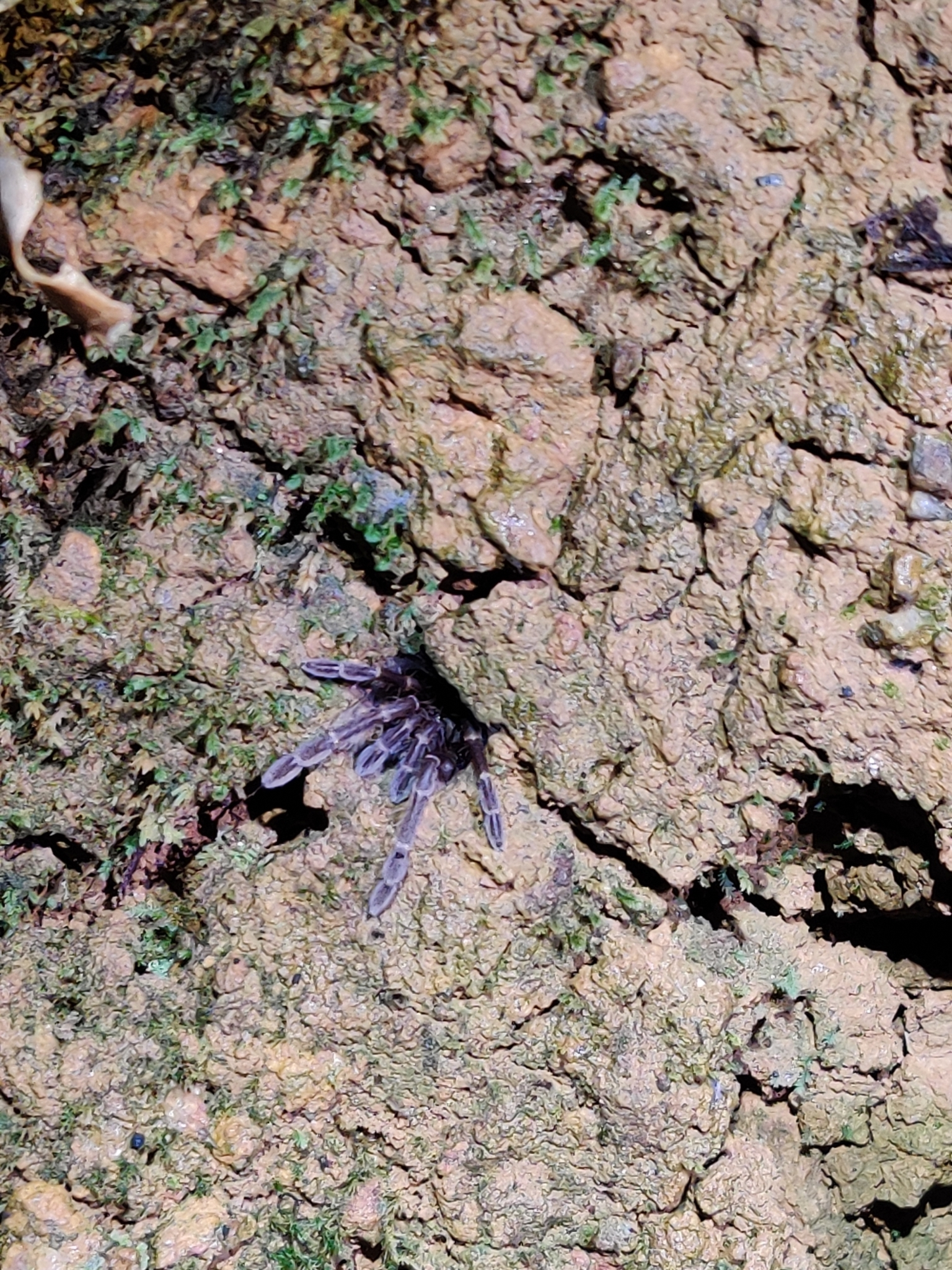
Typical burrow stance of Thrigmopoeus truculentus.

Burrows of Thrigmopoeus truculentus were found in 0.5-5m height from the ground in Coorg and Uttara Kannada districts. These bunds are usually covered with ferns and grasses in Monsoon and post-monsoon. The burrows are found on bunds with high canopy or in the ghat areas were direct sunlight was minimum. Only very few sightings of burrows without canopy are observed. The entrances of burrows belonging to T. truculentus is often shaped like a trumpet-bell, the rim of which is consolidated with wet mud and spider silk. In some cases a porch like entrance is seen due to the extended dorsal rim of the burrow. Often the burrow entrance is reinforced with adjacent twigs, dry leaves and other such artifacts that prevents it from collapsing, as it also offers an extended passage during entry and exit for the inmate of the burrows. The embankments on which the burrows were dug by the spiders were predominantly covered with herbaceous flora, and in the monsoon season the microhabitat was covered in lush green vegetation which conspicuously decreased in post-monsoon.

== Pet trade ==
Thrigmopoeus truculentus has much lesser demand in the pet trade market compared to other spiders, with buyers mainly from United Kingdom, US, Germany and Poland. With increasing demand for tarantulas as pets, there has been an exponential increase in illegal trade and captive breeding efforts. There are indications that locals are usually hired for collection, the spiders are then smuggled to breeders/collectors.

== Threats ==
Thrigmopoeus truculentus is threatened by fragmentation, habitat degradation, soil erosion, developmental activities and pet trade. Habitat degradation is caused by the widening of roads where T. truculentus build its burrows, cutting of trees, soil erosion, tourism and other such human infleuence and bund maintenance. T. truculentus originally barely missed the vulnerable category as listed in the 2008 IUCN Red List of Threatened Animals, However, due to the continuing decline inferred in its area of occupancy, in the quality of habitat and population, T. truculentus has since been put in the Near-threatened species category.
