= Thrigmopoeus =

Scientific classification
- Kingdom: Animalia
- Phylum: Arthropoda
- Subphylum: Chelicerata
- Class: Arachnida
- Order: Araneae
- Infraorder: Mygalomorphae
- Family: Theraphosidae
- Genus: Thrigmopoeus; Pocock, 1899

Type species
- T. insignis Pocock, 1899

Species
- T. insignis Pocock, 1899 – India; T. truculentus Pocock, 1899 – India

Genus of spiders

Thrigmopoeus is a genus of Indian tarantulas that was first described by Reginald Innes Pocock in 1899. As of May 2020 it contains two species, found in India: T. insignis and T. truculentus.
