= Heliophanoides bhutanicus =

Scientific classification
- Kingdom: Animalia
- Phylum: Arthropoda
- Subphylum: Chelicerata
- Class: Arachnida
- Order: Araneae
- Infraorder: Araneomorphae
- Family: Salticidae
- Genus: Heliophanoides
- Species: H. bhutanicus

Binomial name
- Heliophanoides bhutanicus Prószyński, 1992

Species of spider

Heliophanoides bhutanicus is a jumping spider species in the genus Heliophanoides that lives in Bhutan. It was first described in 1992.
