= Heliophanoides spermathecalis =

Scientific classification
- Kingdom: Animalia
- Phylum: Arthropoda
- Subphylum: Chelicerata
- Class: Arachnida
- Order: Araneae
- Infraorder: Araneomorphae
- Family: Salticidae
- Genus: Heliophanoides
- Species: H. spermathecalis

Binomial name
- Heliophanoides spermathecalis Prószyński, 1992

Species of spider

Heliophanoides spermathecalis is a jumping spider species in the genus Heliophanoides that lives in India. The female was first described in 1992.
