= Heliophanoides =

Scientific classification
- Kingdom: Animalia
- Phylum: Arthropoda
- Subphylum: Chelicerata
- Class: Arachnida
- Order: Araneae
- Infraorder: Araneomorphae
- Family: Salticidae
- Subfamily: Salticinae
- Genus: Heliophanoides; Prószyński, 1992

Type species
- Heliophanoides epigynalis Prószyński, 1992

Species
- See text.

Genus of spiders

Heliophanoides is a genus of the spider family Salticidae (jumping spiders).

== Name ==
The genus name is an alteration of the salticid genus name Heliophanus with the meaning "having the likeness of Heliophanus".

== Species ==
As of May 2017, the World Spider Catalog lists the following species in the genus:

- Heliophanoides bhutanicus Prószyński, 1992 – Bhutan
- Heliophanoides epigynalis Prószyński, 1992 – India
- Heliophanoides spermathecalis Prószyński, 1992 – India
