= Parasynema =

Scientific classification
- Domain: Eukaryota
- Kingdom: Animalia
- Phylum: Arthropoda
- Subphylum: Chelicerata
- Class: Arachnida
- Order: Araneae
- Infraorder: Araneomorphae
- Family: Thomisidae
- Genus: Parasynema; Pickard-Cambridge

Type species
- Parasynema cirripes

Species
- Parasynema cambridgei Roewer, 1951 – Guatemala; Parasynema cirripes (O. Pickard-Cambridge, 1891) – Mexico to El Salvador

Genus of spiders

Parasynema is a genus of spiders in the family Thomisidae. It was first described in 1900 by F. O. Pickard-Cambridge. As of 2017, it contains 2 species.
