= Prepotelus =

Scientific classification
- Kingdom: Animalia
- Phylum: Arthropoda
- Subphylum: Chelicerata
- Class: Arachnida
- Order: Araneae
- Infraorder: Araneomorphae
- Family: Thomisidae
- Genus: Prepotelus; Simon, 1898

Type species
- P. lanceolatus Simon, 1898

Species
- 4, see text

Genus of spiders

Prepotelus is a genus of Mauritian crab spiders first described by Eugène Simon in 1898.

== Species ==
As of April 2019 it contains four species:

- Prepotelus curtus Ledoux, 2004 — Réunion
- Prepotelus lanceolatus Simon, 1898 — Mauritius, Réunion
- Prepotelus limbatus (Simon, 1898) — Mauritius
- Prepotelus pectinitarsis (Simon, 1898) — Mauritius
