= Latifrons =

Scientific classification
- Domain: Eukaryota
- Kingdom: Animalia
- Phylum: Arthropoda
- Subphylum: Chelicerata
- Class: Arachnida
- Order: Araneae
- Infraorder: Araneomorphae
- Family: Thomisidae
- Genus: Latifrons
- Species: L. picta

Binomial name
- Latifrons picta Kulczyński, 1911

Genus of spiders

Latifrons is a genus of spiders in the family Thomisidae. It was first described in 1911 by Władysław Kulczyński. As of 2017, it contains only one species, Latifrons picta, of New Guinea.
