= Rhaebobates =

Scientific classification
- Domain: Eukaryota
- Kingdom: Animalia
- Phylum: Arthropoda
- Subphylum: Chelicerata
- Class: Arachnida
- Order: Araneae
- Infraorder: Araneomorphae
- Family: Thomisidae
- Genus: Rhaebobates; Thorell, 1881

Type species
- Rhaebobates lituratus

Species
- Rhaebobates latifrons Kulczyński, 1911; Rhaebobates lituratus Thorell, 1881

Genus of spiders

Rhaebobates is a genus of spiders in the family Thomisidae. It was first described in 1881 by Tamerlan Thorell. As of 2017, it contains 2 species, both from New Guinea.
