= Deltoclita =

Scientific classification
- Kingdom: Animalia
- Phylum: Arthropoda
- Subphylum: Chelicerata
- Class: Arachnida
- Order: Araneae
- Infraorder: Araneomorphae
- Family: Thomisidae
- Genus: Deltoclita; Simon, 1887

Type species
- D. rubripes (Keyserling, 1880)

Species
- D. bioculata Mello-Leitão, 1929 – Brazil; D. rubra Mello-Leitão, 1943 – Brazil; D. rubripes (Keyserling, 1880) – Peru, Brazil

Genus of spiders

Deltoclita is a genus of South American crab spiders that was first described by Eugène Louis Simon in 1887. As of August 2020 it contains three species, found in Peru and Brazil: D. bioculata, D. rubra, and D. rubripes.

== See also ==
- List of Thomisidae species
