= Paratobias =

Scientific classification
- Kingdom: Animalia
- Phylum: Arthropoda
- Subphylum: Chelicerata
- Class: Arachnida
- Order: Araneae
- Infraorder: Araneomorphae
- Family: Thomisidae
- Genus: Paratobias; F. O. Pickard-Cambridge, 1900
- Species: P. championi

Binomial name
- Paratobias championi F. O. Pickard-Cambridge, 1900

Genus of crab spiders

Paratobias is a monotypic genus of Central American crab spiders containing the single species, Paratobias championi. It was first described by Frederick Octavius Pickard-Cambridge in 1900, and it has only been found in Panama. Eugène Simon synonymized it with Stephanopis in 1903 due to several similarities to the genus, but Machado & Teixeira revalidated the genus in 2021, citing the distinctive trapezoidal shape of the abdomen as well as several differences in eye morphology.

== See also ==
- Stephanopis
- Coenypha
- List of Thomisidae genera
