= Rangkayo =

Scientific classification
- Kingdom: Animalia
- Phylum: Arthropoda
- Subphylum: Chelicerata
- Class: Arachnida
- Order: Araneae
- Infraorder: Araneomorphae
- Family: Thomisidae
- Genus: Rangkayo; Dhiya'ulhaq & Benjamin, 2025

Type species
- R. hitam Dhiya'ulhaq & Benjamin, 2025

Species
- 2, see text

Genus of spiders

Rangkayo is a genus of spiders in the family Thomisidae.

== Distribution ==
Rangkayo is only known from Sumatra, Indonesia.

== Etymology ==
The genus and R. hitam are named after Orang Kayo Hitam (Rangkayo), a king involved in the founding of Jambi City. R. perkaso is derived from the Jambi Malay "perkaso" (powerful), taken from a poem about Rangkayo Hitam.

== Species ==
As of January 2026, this genus includes two species:

- Rangkayo hitam Dhiya'ulhaq & Benjamin, 2025 – Indonesia (Sumatra)
- Rangkayo perkaso Dhiya'ulhaq & Benjamin, 2025 – Indonesia (Sumatra)
