= Taypaliito =

Scientific classification
- Domain: Eukaryota
- Kingdom: Animalia
- Phylum: Arthropoda
- Subphylum: Chelicerata
- Class: Arachnida
- Order: Araneae
- Infraorder: Araneomorphae
- Family: Thomisidae
- Genus: Taypaliito
- Species: T. iorebotco

Binomial name
- Taypaliito iorebotco Barrion & Litsinger, 1995

Genus of spiders

Taypaliito is a genus of spiders in the family Thomisidae. It was first described in 1995 by Barrion & Litsinger. As of 2017, it contains only one species, Taypaliito iorebotco, found in the Philippines.
