= Synaemops =

Scientific classification
- Domain: Eukaryota
- Kingdom: Animalia
- Phylum: Arthropoda
- Subphylum: Chelicerata
- Class: Arachnida
- Order: Araneae
- Infraorder: Araneomorphae
- Family: Thomisidae
- Genus: Synaemops; Mello-Leitão

Type species
- Synaemops nigridorsi

Species
- Synaemops nigridorsi Mello-Leitão, 1929 – Brazil; Synaemops notabilis Mello-Leitão, 1941 – Argentina; Synaemops pugilator Mello-Leitão, 1941 – Brazil; Synaemops rubropunctatus Mello-Leitão, 1929 – Brazil

Genus of spiders

Synaemops is a genus of spiders in the family Thomisidae. It was first described in 1929 by Mello-Leitão. As of 2017, it contains 4 species from South America.
