= Pasiasula =

Scientific classification
- Kingdom: Animalia
- Phylum: Arthropoda
- Subphylum: Chelicerata
- Class: Arachnida
- Order: Araneae
- Infraorder: Araneomorphae
- Family: Thomisidae
- Genus: Pasiasula
- Species: P. eidmanni

Binomial name
- Pasiasula eidmanni Roewer, 1942

Genus of spiders

Pasiasula is a genus of spiders in the family Thomisidae. It was first described in 1942 by Roewer. As of 2017, it contains only one species, Pasiasula eidmanni, found on Bioko.
