= Physoplatys =

Scientific classification
- Kingdom: Animalia
- Phylum: Arthropoda
- Subphylum: Chelicerata
- Class: Arachnida
- Order: Araneae
- Infraorder: Araneomorphae
- Family: Thomisidae
- Genus: Physoplatys
- Species: P. nitidus

Binomial name
- Physoplatys nitidus Simon, 1895

Genus of spiders

Physoplatys is a genus of spiders in the family Thomisidae. It was first described in 1895 by Simon. As of 2017, it contains only one species, Physoplatys nitidus, found in Paraguay.
