= Parastrophius =

Scientific classification
- Kingdom: Animalia
- Phylum: Arthropoda
- Subphylum: Chelicerata
- Class: Arachnida
- Order: Araneae
- Infraorder: Araneomorphae
- Family: Thomisidae
- Genus: Parastrophius; Simon

Type species
- Parastrophius echinosoma

Species
- Parastrophius echinosoma Simon, 1903 - Cameroon, Equatorial Guinea; Parastrophius vishwai Dyal, 1935 - Pakistan

Genus of spiders

Parastrophius is a genus of spiders in the family Thomisidae. It was first described in 1903 by Simon. As of 2017, it contains 2 species.
