= Ceraarachne =

Scientific classification
- Kingdom: Animalia
- Phylum: Arthropoda
- Subphylum: Chelicerata
- Class: Arachnida
- Order: Araneae
- Infraorder: Araneomorphae
- Family: Thomisidae
- Genus: Ceraarachne; Keyserling, 1880

Type species
- C. varia Keyserling, 1880

Species
- 4, see text

Synonyms
- Synstrophius Mello-Leitão, 1925

Genus of spiders

Ceraarachne is a genus of South American crab spiders that was first described by Eugen von Keyserling in 1880.

== Species ==
As of June 2020 it contains four species, found in Colombia and Brazil:

- Ceraarachne blanci (Mello-Leitão, 1917) – Brazil
- Ceraarachne germaini Simon, 1886 – Brazil
- Ceraarachne goyannensis Mello-Leitão, 1929 – Brazil
- Ceraarachne varia Keyserling, 1880 (type) – Colombia

== See also ==
- List of Thomisidae species
