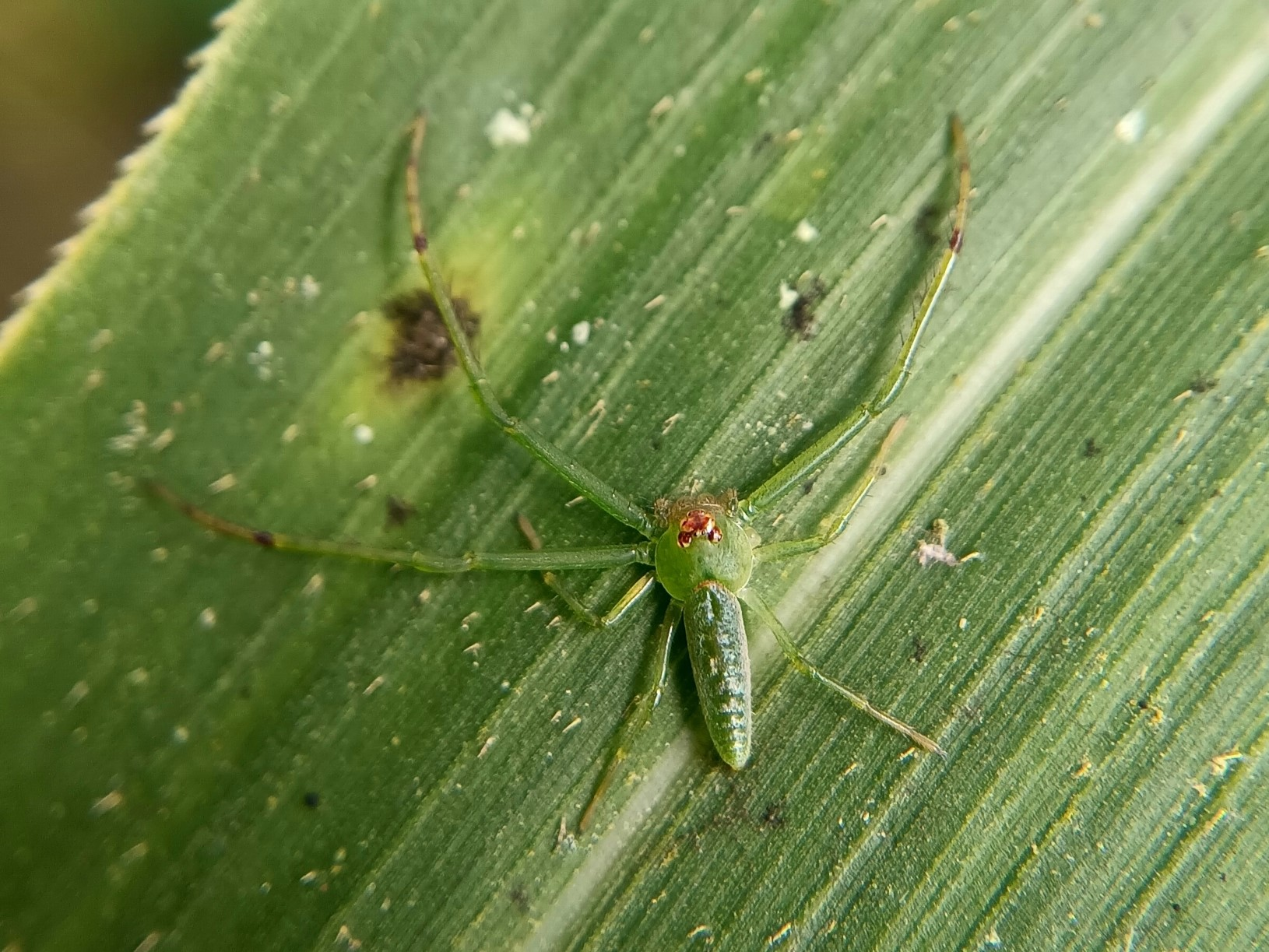
- Unidentified species of Loxobates

Scientific classification
- Domain: Eukaryota
- Kingdom: Animalia
- Phylum: Arthropoda
- Subphylum: Chelicerata
- Class: Arachnida
- Order: Araneae
- Infraorder: Araneomorphae
- Family: Thomisidae
- Genus: Loxobates; Thorell, 1877

Type species
- Loxobates ephippiatus

Species
- 9, see text

= Loxobates =

Genus of spiders

Loxobates is a genus of spiders in the family Thomisidae. It was first described in 1877 by Tamerlan Thorell. As of 2021, it contains 9 Asian species.

== Species ==
Loxobates comprises the following species:

- Loxobates castetsi (Simon, 1906) - India
- Loxobates daitoensis Ono, 1988 - China, Japan
- Loxobates ephippiatus Thorell, 1877 - Indonesia (Sulawesi)
- Loxobates kapuri (Tikader, 1980) - India
- Loxobates kawilus Barrion & Litsinger, 1995 - Philippines
- Loxobates masapangensis Barrion & Litsinger, 1995 - Philippines
- Loxobates minor Ono, 2001 - Bhutan, China
- Loxobates ornatus Thorell, 1891 - Malaysia
- Loxobates quinquenotatus Thorell, 1895 - Myanmar
