= Narcaeus =

Scientific classification
- Domain: Eukaryota
- Kingdom: Animalia
- Phylum: Arthropoda
- Subphylum: Chelicerata
- Class: Arachnida
- Order: Araneae
- Infraorder: Araneomorphae
- Family: Thomisidae
- Genus: Narcaeus; Thorell, 1890
- Species: N. picinus

Binomial name
- Narcaeus picinus Thorell, 1890

Genus of spiders

Narcaeus is a genus of spiders in the family Thomisidae. It was first described in 1890 by Tamerlan Thorell. As of 2017, it contains only one species, Narcaeus picinus, found on Java.
