= Megapyge =

Scientific classification
- Kingdom: Animalia
- Phylum: Arthropoda
- Subphylum: Chelicerata
- Class: Arachnida
- Order: Araneae
- Infraorder: Araneomorphae
- Family: Thomisidae
- Genus: Megapyge
- Species: M. rufa

Binomial name
- Megapyge rufa Caporiacco, 1947

Genus of spiders

Megapyge is a genus of spiders in the family Thomisidae. It was first described in 1947 by Caporiacco. As of 2017, it contains only one species, Megapyge rufa, of Guyana.
