= Erissus =

Scientific classification
- Kingdom: Animalia
- Phylum: Arthropoda
- Subphylum: Chelicerata
- Class: Arachnida
- Order: Araneae
- Infraorder: Araneomorphae
- Family: Thomisidae
- Genus: Erissus; Simon, 1895

Type species
- E. validus Simon, 1895

Species
- 10, see text

Genus of spiders

Erissus is a genus of South American crab spiders that was first described by Eugène Louis Simon in 1895.

== Species ==
As of September 2020 it contains ten species, found in Venezuela, Peru, and Brazil:

- Erissus angulosus Simon, 1895 – Brazil
- Erissus bateae Soares, 1941 – Brazil
- Erissus bilineatus Mello-Leitão, 1929 – Brazil
- Erissus fuscus Simon, 1929 – Peru, Brazil
- Erissus mirabilis (Soares, 1942) – Brazil
- Erissus roseus Mello-Leitão, 1943 – Brazil
- Erissus sanctaeleopoldinae (Soares & Soares, 1946) – Brazil
- Erissus spinosissimus Mello-Leitão, 1929 – Brazil
- Erissus truncatifrons Simon, 1895 – Venezuela, Brazil
- Erissus validus Simon, 1895 (type) – Peru, Brazil

== See also ==
- List of Thomisidae species
