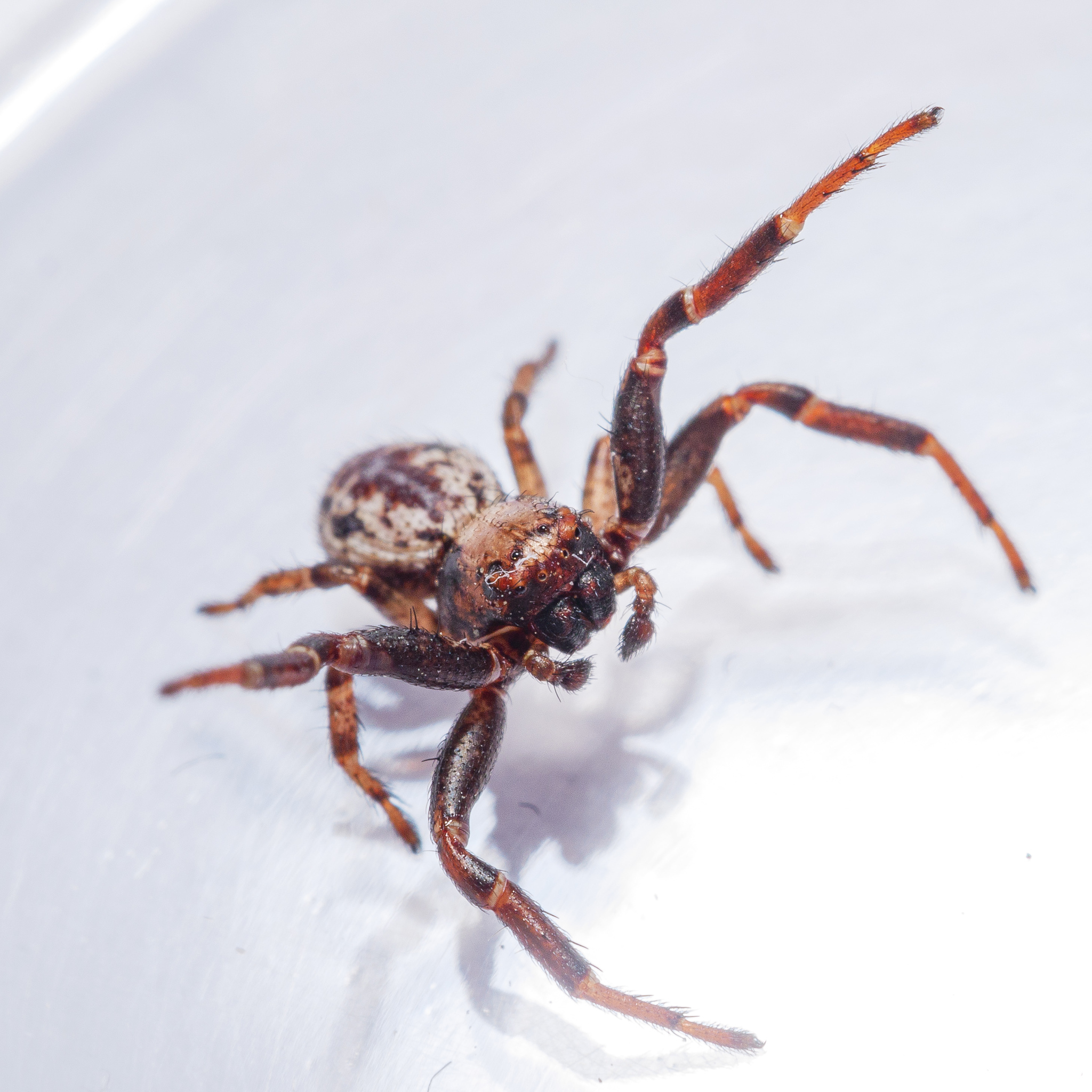

Scientific classification
- Kingdom: Animalia
- Phylum: Arthropoda
- Subphylum: Chelicerata
- Class: Arachnida
- Order: Araneae
- Infraorder: Araneomorphae
- Family: Thomisidae
- Genus: Cymbachina; Bryant, 1933
- Species: C. albobrunnea

Binomial name
- Cymbachina albobrunnea (Urquhart, 1893)

= Cymbachina =

Monotypic genus of spiders

Cymbachina is a monotypic genus of South Pacific crab spiders containing the single species, Cymbachina albobrunnea, found on the South Island of New Zealand. The species was first described in 1893 by A. T. Urquhart under the name Xysticus albo-brunnea. As classification became more focused on physical structure rather than colour patterns or teeth on tarsal claws, this species was re-examined in 1933 and placed into its own genus.

== See also ==
- List of Thomisidae species
