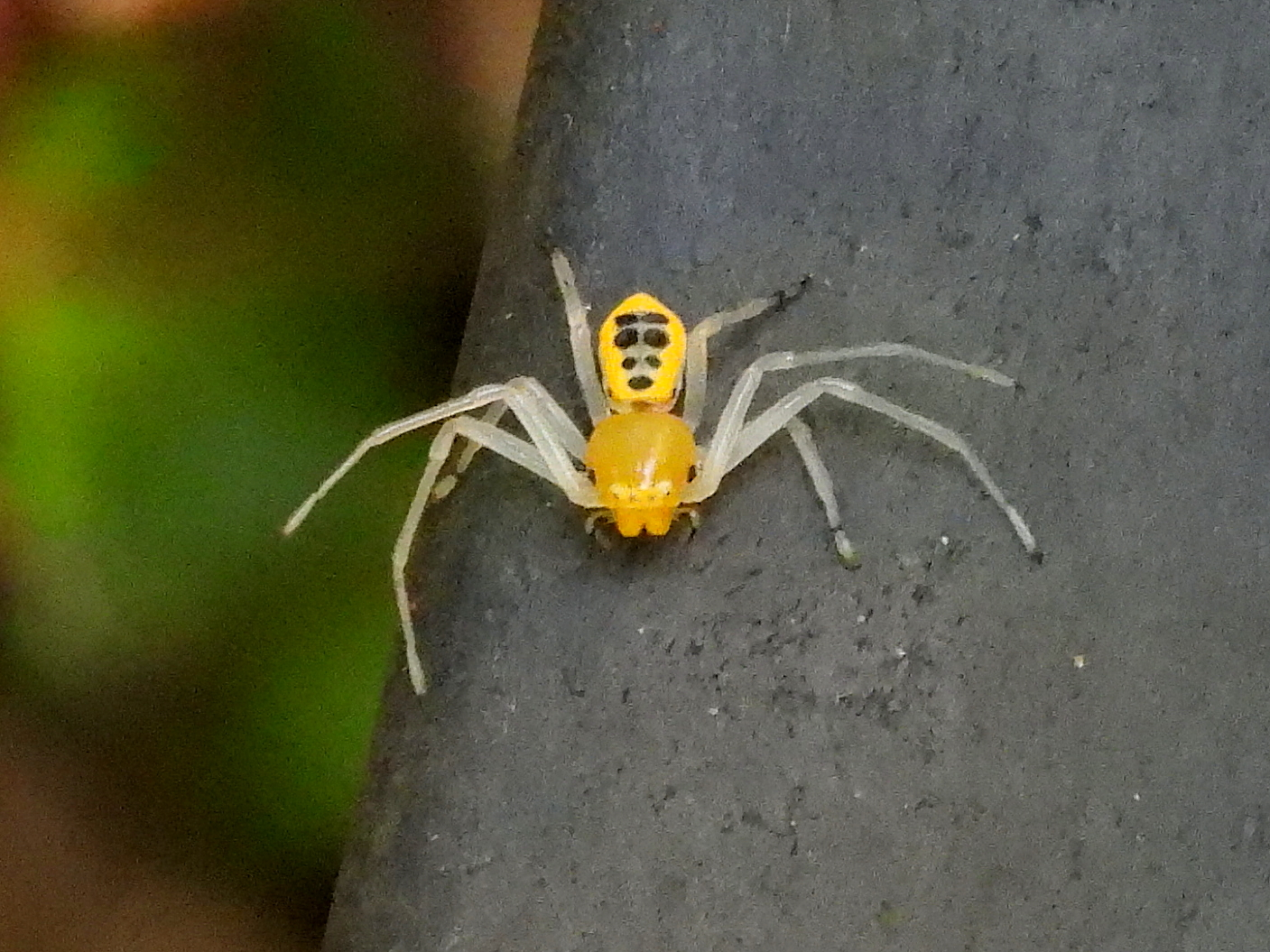

Scientific classification
- Kingdom: Animalia
- Phylum: Arthropoda
- Subphylum: Chelicerata
- Class: Arachnida
- Order: Araneae
- Infraorder: Araneomorphae
- Family: Thomisidae
- Genus: Poecilothomisus; Simon, 1895
- Species: P. speciosus

Binomial name
- Poecilothomisus speciosus (Thorell, 1881)

= Poecilothomisus =

Genus of spiders

Poecilothomisus is a genus of spiders in the family Thomisidae. It was first described in 1895 by Simon. As of 2017, it contains only one species, Poecilothomisus speciosus, found in northern Australia.
