= Tharpyna =

Scientific classification
- Kingdom: Animalia
- Phylum: Arthropoda
- Subphylum: Chelicerata
- Class: Arachnida
- Order: Araneae
- Infraorder: Araneomorphae
- Family: Thomisidae
- Genus: Tharpyna; Koch

Type species
- Tharpyna diademata

Species
- 12, see text

Genus of spiders

Tharpyna is a genus of spiders in the family Thomisidae. It was first described in 1874 by Ludwig Carl Christian Koch. As of 2017, it contains 12 species from Australia, India, and Indonesia.

== Species ==
Tharpyna comprises the following species:

- Tharpyna albosignata L. Koch, 1876 – Australia (Queensland, New South Wales)
- Tharpyna campestrata L. Koch, 1874 – Australia (Queensland, Western Australia)
- Tharpyna decorata Karsch, 1878 – Australia (New South Wales)
- Tharpyna diademata L. Koch, 1874 – Australia (mainland, Lord Howe Is.)
- Tharpyna himachalensis Tikader & Biswas, 1979 – India
- Tharpyna hirsuta L. Koch, 1875 – Australia
- Tharpyna indica Tikader & Biswas, 1979 – India
- Tharpyna munda L. Koch, 1875 – Australia
- Tharpyna simpsoni Hickman, 1944 – Australia (South Australia)
- Tharpyna speciosa Rainbow, 1920 – Australia (Lord Howe Is.)
- Tharpyna varica Thorell, 1890 – Indonesia (Java)
- Tharpyna venusta (L. Koch, 1874) – Australia (New South Wales)
