= Philodamia =

Scientific classification
- Domain: Eukaryota
- Kingdom: Animalia
- Phylum: Arthropoda
- Subphylum: Chelicerata
- Class: Arachnida
- Order: Araneae
- Infraorder: Araneomorphae
- Family: Thomisidae
- Genus: Philodamia; Thorell, 1895

Type species
- Philodamia hilaris Thorell, 1895

Species
- 7, see text

Genus of spiders

Philodamia is a genus of spiders in the family Thomisidae. It was first described in 1895 by Tamerlan Thorell.

== Species ==
Philodamia contains the following seven species:

- Philodamia armillata Thorell, 1895 – Bhutan, Myanmar
- Philodamia gongi (Yin, Peng, Gong & Kim, 2004) – China
- Philodamia hilaris Thorell, 1895 – Singapore
- Philodamia pingxiang Zhu & Ono, 2007 – China
- Philodamia semicincta (Workman, 1896) – Singapore
- Philodamia tongmian Zhu & Ono, 2007 – China
- Philodamia variata Thorell, 1895 – Singapore
