= Wechselia =

Scientific classification
- Kingdom: Animalia
- Phylum: Arthropoda
- Subphylum: Chelicerata
- Class: Arachnida
- Order: Araneae
- Infraorder: Araneomorphae
- Family: Thomisidae
- Genus: Wechselia; Dahl, 1907
- Species: W. steinbachi

Binomial name
- Wechselia steinbachi Dahl, 1907

Genus of spiders

Wechselia is a genus of spiders in the family Thomisidae. It was first described in 1907 by Dahl. As of 2017, it contains only one species, Wechselia steinbachi, found in Argentina.
