= Phireza =

Scientific classification
- Kingdom: Animalia
- Phylum: Arthropoda
- Subphylum: Chelicerata
- Class: Arachnida
- Order: Araneae
- Infraorder: Araneomorphae
- Family: Thomisidae
- Genus: Phireza
- Species: P. sexmaculata

Binomial name
- Phireza sexmaculata Simon, 1886

Genus of spiders

Phireza is a genus of spiders in the family Thomisidae. It was first described in 1886 by Simon. As of 2017, it contains only one Brazilian species, Phireza sexmaculata.
