= Cetratus =

Scientific classification
- Kingdom: Animalia
- Phylum: Arthropoda
- Subphylum: Chelicerata
- Class: Arachnida
- Order: Araneae
- Infraorder: Araneomorphae
- Family: Thomisidae
- Genus: Cetratus; Kulczyński, 1911

Type species
- C. annulatus Kulczyński, 1911

Species
- 5, see text

Genus of spiders

Cetratus is a genus of South Pacific crab spiders that was first described by Władysław Kulczyński in 1911.

== Species ==
As of July 2020 it contains five species, found in Australia and Papua New Guinea:

- Cetratus annulatus Kulczyński, 1911 (type) – New Guinea
- Cetratus caecutiens (L. Koch, 1876) – Australia (Queensland)
- Cetratus circumlitus (L. Koch, 1876) – Australia (New South Wales)
- Cetratus rubropunctatus (Rainbow, 1920) – Australia (Queensland, Lord Howe Is.)
- Cetratus tenuis (L. Koch, 1875) – Australia (Queensland, New South Wales)

== See also ==
- List of Thomisidae species
