= Domatha =

Scientific classification
- Kingdom: Animalia
- Phylum: Arthropoda
- Subphylum: Chelicerata
- Class: Arachnida
- Order: Araneae
- Infraorder: Araneomorphae
- Family: Thomisidae
- Genus: Domatha; Simon, 1895

Type species
- D. vivida Simon, 1895

Species
- D. celeris Kulczyński, 1911 – New Guinea; D. vivida Simon, 1895 – Philippines

Genus of spiders

Domatha is a genus of crab spiders that was first described by Eugène Louis Simon in 1895. As of September 2020 it contains two species, found in the Philippines and Papua New Guinea: D. celeris and D. vivida.

== See also ==
- List of Thomisidae species
