= Gnoerichia =

Scientific classification
- Kingdom: Animalia
- Phylum: Arthropoda
- Subphylum: Chelicerata
- Class: Arachnida
- Order: Araneae
- Infraorder: Araneomorphae
- Family: Thomisidae
- Genus: Gnoerichia; Dahl, 1907
- Species: G. buettneri

Binomial name
- Gnoerichia buettneri Dahl, 1907

Monotypic genus of spiders

Gnoerichia is a monotypic genus of African crab spiders containing the single species, Gnoerichia buettneri. It was first described by Friedrich Dahl in 1907, and is found in Cameroon.

== See also ==
- List of Thomisidae species
