= Pseudamyciaea =

Scientific classification
- Kingdom: Animalia
- Phylum: Arthropoda
- Subphylum: Chelicerata
- Class: Arachnida
- Order: Araneae
- Infraorder: Araneomorphae
- Family: Thomisidae
- Genus: Pseudamyciaea
- Species: P. fuscicauda

Binomial name
- Pseudamyciaea fuscicauda Simon, 1905

Genus of spiders

Pseudamyciaea is a genus of spiders in the family Thomisidae. It was first described in 1905 by Simon. As of 2017, it contains only one species, Pseudamyciaea fuscicauda, found in Java.
