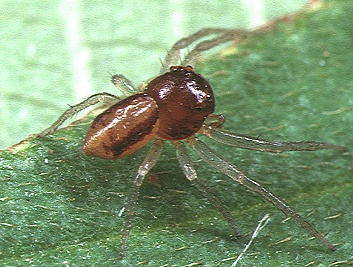
- A. limbatus, male
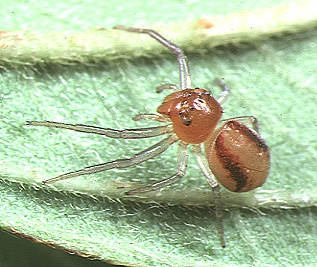
- A. limbatus, female

Scientific classification
- Kingdom: Animalia
- Phylum: Arthropoda
- Subphylum: Chelicerata
- Class: Arachnida
- Order: Araneae
- Infraorder: Araneomorphae
- Family: Thomisidae
- Genus: Alcimochthes; Simon, 1885

Type species
- A. limbatus Simon, 1885

Species
- A. limbatus Simon, 1885 – Malaysia, Singapore, Vietnam, China, Taiwan, Japan; A. melanophthalmus Simon, 1903 – Vietnam; A. meridionalis Tang & Li, 2009 – China

= Alcimochthes =

Genus of spiders

Alcimochthes is a genus of Asian crab spiders that was first described by Eugène Louis Simon in 1885. As of June 2020 it contains three species, found in eastern Asia: A. limbatus, A. melanophthalmus, and A. meridionalis.

== See also ==
- List of Thomisidae species
