= Isaloides =

Scientific classification
- Kingdom: Animalia
- Phylum: Arthropoda
- Subphylum: Chelicerata
- Class: Arachnida
- Order: Araneae
- Infraorder: Araneomorphae
- Family: Thomisidae
- Genus: Isaloides; Pickard-Cambridge, 1900

Type species
- Isaloides putus (O. Pickard-Cambridge, 1891)

Species
- See text.

Genus of spiders

Isaloides is a genus of spiders in the family Thomisidae. It was first described in 1900 by F.O. Pickard-Cambridge. As of 2025, it contains 4 species.

== Species ==
As of February 2025, the World Spider Catalog includes 4 species:

- Isaloides echinatus (Banks, 1914) – Cuba
- Isaloides putus (O. Pickard-Cambridge, 1891) – Mexico (Veracruz), Panama
- Isaloides toussainti Banks, 1903 – Cuba, Hispaniola
- Isaloides yollotl Jiménez, 1992 – Mexico (Baja Sur)
