= Saccodomus =

Scientific classification
- Domain: Eukaryota
- Kingdom: Animalia
- Phylum: Arthropoda
- Subphylum: Chelicerata
- Class: Arachnida
- Order: Araneae
- Infraorder: Araneomorphae
- Family: Thomisidae
- Genus: Saccodomus
- Species: S. formivorus

Binomial name
- Saccodomus formivorus Rainbow, 1900

Genus of spiders

Saccodomus is a genus of spiders in the family Thomisidae. It was first described in 1900 by Rainbow. As of 2017, it contains only one species, Saccodomus formivorus, found in New South Wales.
