= Heriaesynaema =

Scientific classification
- Kingdom: Animalia
- Phylum: Arthropoda
- Subphylum: Chelicerata
- Class: Arachnida
- Order: Araneae
- Infraorder: Araneomorphae
- Family: Thomisidae
- Genus: Heriaesynaema; Caporiacco, 1939
- Species: H. flavipes

Binomial name
- Heriaesynaema flavipes Caporiacco, 1939

Monotypic genus of spiders

Heriaesynaema is a monotypic genus of African crab spiders containing the single species, Heriaesynaema flavipes. It was first described by Lodovico di Caporiacco in 1939, and is found in Ethiopia.

== See also ==
- List of Thomisidae species
