= Ansistaria =

Scientific classification
- Domain: Eukaryota
- Kingdom: Animalia
- Phylum: Arthropoda
- Subphylum: Chelicerata
- Class: Arachnida
- Order: Araneae
- Infraorder: Araneomorphae
- Family: Thomisidae
- Genus: Ansistaria; Sherwood, 2022

Type species
- A. silva (Lewis & Dippenaar-Schoeman, 2014)

Species
- Ansistaria silva (Lewis & Dippenaar-Schoeman, 2014); Ansistaria unicolor (Simon, 1895)

Synonyms
- Leroya Lewis & Dippenaar-Schoeman, 2014

Genus of spiders

Ansistaria is a genus of African crab spiders first described by Danniella Sherwood in 2022. As of July 2022 it contains only two species.
