= Ocyllus =

Scientific classification
- Domain: Eukaryota
- Kingdom: Animalia
- Phylum: Arthropoda
- Subphylum: Chelicerata
- Class: Arachnida
- Order: Araneae
- Infraorder: Araneomorphae
- Family: Thomisidae
- Genus: Ocyllus; Thorell, 1887

Type species
- Ocyllus binotatus

Species
- Ocyllus binotatus Thorell, 1887; Ocyllus pallens Thorell, 1895

Genus of spiders

Ocyllus is a genus of spiders in the family Thomisidae. It was first described in 1887 by Tamerlan Thorell. As of 2017, it contains 2 species, both found in Myanmar.
