= Dietopsa =

Scientific classification
- Kingdom: Animalia
- Phylum: Arthropoda
- Subphylum: Chelicerata
- Class: Arachnida
- Order: Araneae
- Infraorder: Araneomorphae
- Family: Thomisidae
- Genus: Dietopsa; Strand, 1932

Type species
- D. parnassia (Simon, 1895)

Species
- D. castaneifrons (Simon, 1895) – India; D. parnassia (Simon, 1895) – India

Genus of spiders

Dietopsa is a genus of Asian crab spiders that was first described by Embrik Strand in 1932. As of August 2020 it contains two species, found in India: D. castaneifrons and D. parnassia.

== See also ==
- List of Thomisidae species
