= Bonapruncinia =

Scientific classification
- Kingdom: Animalia
- Phylum: Arthropoda
- Subphylum: Chelicerata
- Class: Arachnida
- Order: Araneae
- Infraorder: Araneomorphae
- Family: Thomisidae
- Genus: Bonapruncinia; Benoit, 1977
- Species: B. sanctaehelenae

Binomial name
- Bonapruncinia sanctaehelenae Benoit, 1977

Monotypic genus of spiders

Bonapruncinia is a monotypic genus of Atlantic crab spiders containing the single species, Bonapruncinia sanctaehelenae. It was first described by P. L. G. Benoit in 1977, and is found on Saint Helena.

== See also ==
- List of Thomisidae species
