= Platyarachne =

Scientific classification
- Domain: Eukaryota
- Kingdom: Animalia
- Phylum: Arthropoda
- Subphylum: Chelicerata
- Class: Arachnida
- Order: Araneae
- Infraorder: Araneomorphae
- Family: Thomisidae
- Genus: Platyarachne; Keyserling

Type species
- Platyarachne episcopalis

Species
- Platyarachne argentina Mello-Leitão, 1944; Platyarachne episcopalis (Taczanowski, 1872); Platyarachne histrix Simon, 1895; Platyarachne scopulifera Simon, 1895

Genus of spiders

Platyarachne is a genus of spiders in the family Thomisidae. It was first described in 1880 by Keyserling. As of 2017, it contains 4 species from South America.
