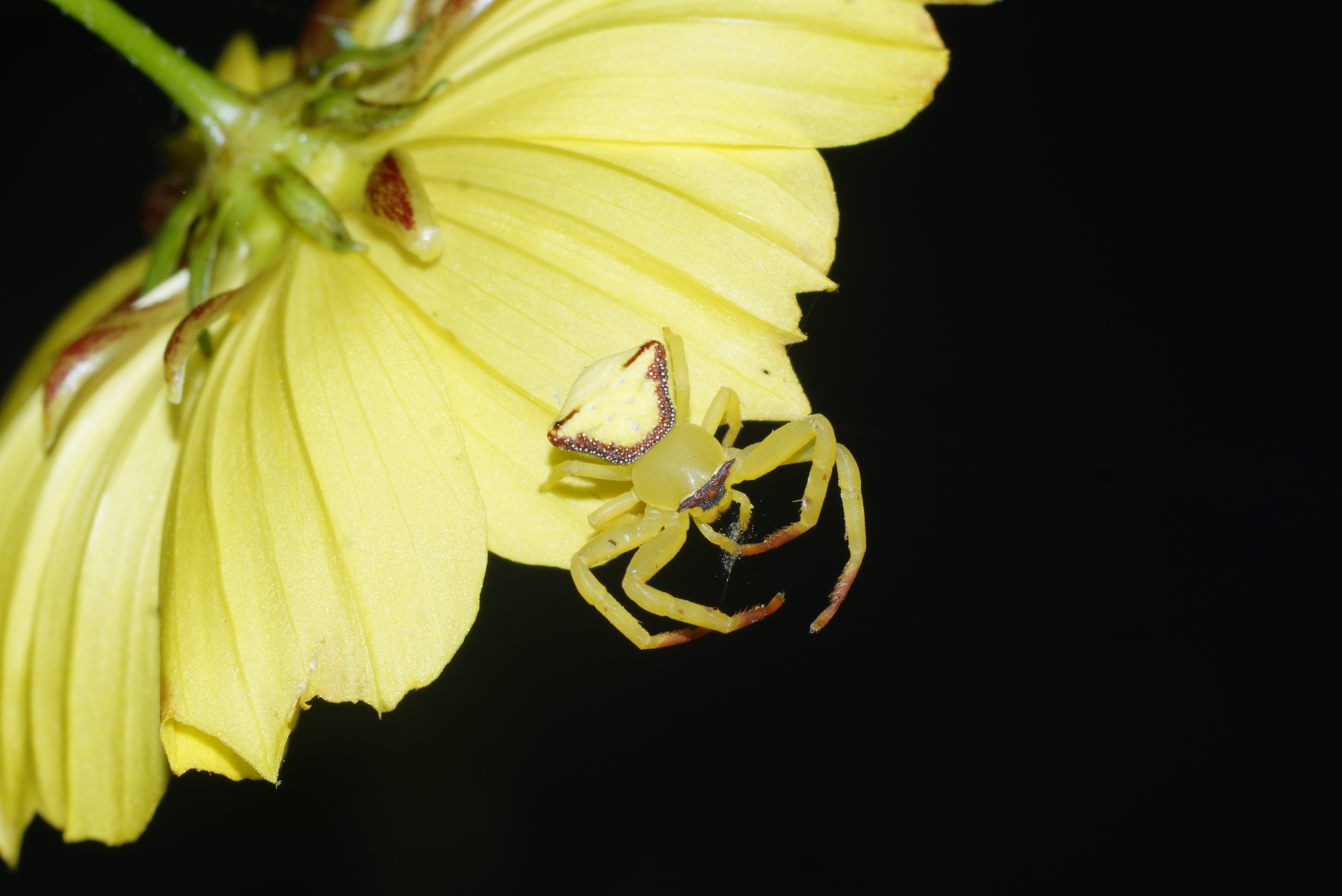

Scientific classification
- Kingdom: Animalia
- Phylum: Arthropoda
- Subphylum: Chelicerata
- Class: Arachnida
- Order: Araneae
- Infraorder: Araneomorphae
- Family: Thomisidae; Sundevall, 1833

Diversity
- 172 genera, 2,194 species
- blue: reported countries (WSC) green: observation hotspots (iNaturalist)

= Thomisidae =

Thomisidae Temporal range: Palaeogene–present

Family of spiders

The Thomisidae are a family of spiders, including about 170 genera and over 2,100 species. The common name crab spider is often linked to species in this family, but may also be used for spiders from other families. Many members of this family are also known as flower spiders or flower crab spiders.

== Etymology ==
Spiders in this family are called "crab spiders" due to their body shape, behavior of holding their two front pairs of legs apart from the two rear pairs, and their ability to scuttle sideways or backwards, resembling true crabs. The Thomisidae are the family generally referred to as "crab spiders", though some members of the Sparassidae are called "giant crab spiders", the Selenopidae are called "wall crab spiders", and various members of the Sicariidae are sometimes called "six-eyed crab spiders". Some distantly related orb-weaver spider species such as Gasteracantha cancriformis also are sometimes called "crab spiders".

== Description ==
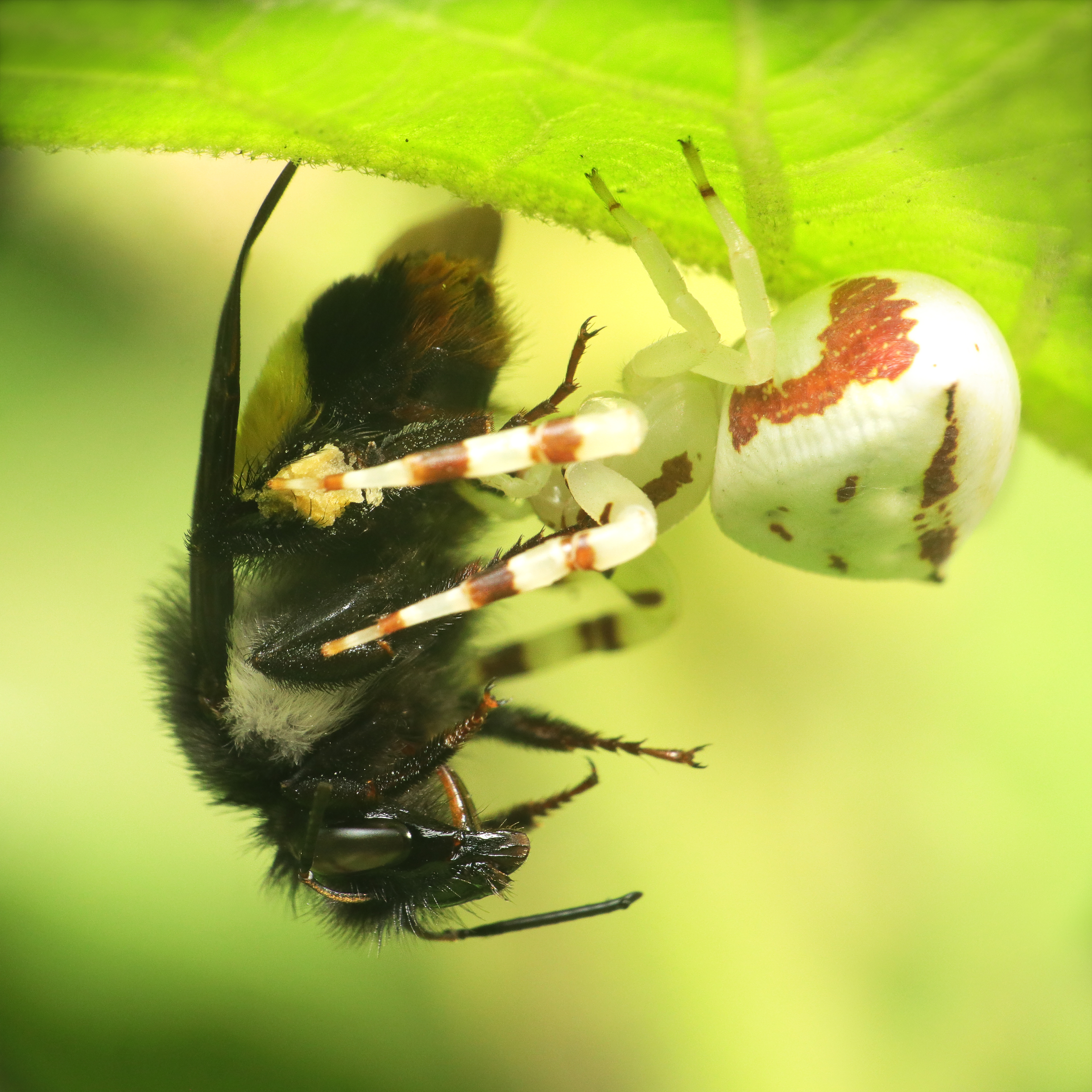
Crab spider eating a bumblebee.

Members of this family of spiders are ambush predators and do not spin webs. The two front legs are usually longer and more robust than the other legs. The back two legs are smaller, and are usually covered in a series of strong spines. Their coloration may be dull with colors such as brown or grey, or very bright green, pink, white or yellow to match their flower. These spiders are quite easy to identify, though can occasionally be confused with the usually larger huntsman spiders.

The spiders of Thomisidae are not known to be harmful to humans. However, spiders of a distantly related genus, Sicarius, which are sometimes referred to as "crab spiders", or "six-eyed crab spiders", are close cousins to the recluse spiders, and are highly venomous, though human bites are rare.

=== Sexual dimorphism ===
Several different types of sexual dimorphism have been recorded in crab spiders. Some species exhibit color dimorphisms; however, the most apparent dimorphism is the difference in size between males and females. In some species, this is relatively small; females of Misumena vatia are roughly twice the size of their male counterparts. In other cases, the difference is extreme; on average, female Thomisus onustus are more than 60 times as massive as the males.

Several hypothesized explanations are given for the evolution of sexual size dimorphisms in the Thomisidae and other sister taxa. The most widely acknowledged hypothesis for female growth is the fecundity hypothesis: selection favors larger females so they can produce more eggs and healthier offspring. Because males do not carry and lay eggs, a growth in size does not confer a fitness advantage.

However, sexual size dimorphism may be a result of male dwarfism. The gravity hypothesis suggests that the smaller size allows the male to travel with greater ease, providing him with an increased opportunity to find mates. Females are comparatively stationary, and their larger size allows them to capture larger prey, such as butterflies and bees, granting females the additional nutrients necessary for egg production.

Other hypotheses propose that sexual size dimorphism evolved by chance, and no selective advantage exists to larger females or smaller males.

== Behavior ==
Cf. Misumessus oblongus jumps with safety line, on yellow ironweed. Repeated at variable slow motion to better see silk line.

Thomisidae do not build webs to trap prey, though all of them produce silk for drop lines and sundry reproductive purposes; some are wandering hunters and the most widely known are ambush predators. Some species sit on or beside flowers or fruit, where they grab and kill visiting insects. Individuals of some species, such as Misumena vatia and Thomisus spectabilis, are able to change color over a period of some days, to match the flower on which they are sitting. Some species await prey among leaves or bark, and some species are excellent mimics of bird droppings and sit out in the open; these species convergently evolved their mimicry with the so-called bird-dropping spiders of Araneidae.

Other species of crab spiders with flattened bodies either hunt in the crevices of tree trunks or under loose bark, or shelter under such crevices by day, and come out at night to hunt. Members of the genus Xysticus hunt in the leaf litter on the ground. In each case, crab spiders use their powerful front legs to grab and hold on to prey while paralysing it with a venomous bite.

The spider family Aphantochilidae was incorporated into the Thomisidae in the late 1980s; Aphantochilus species mimic and prey upon Cephalotes ants.

== Genera ==
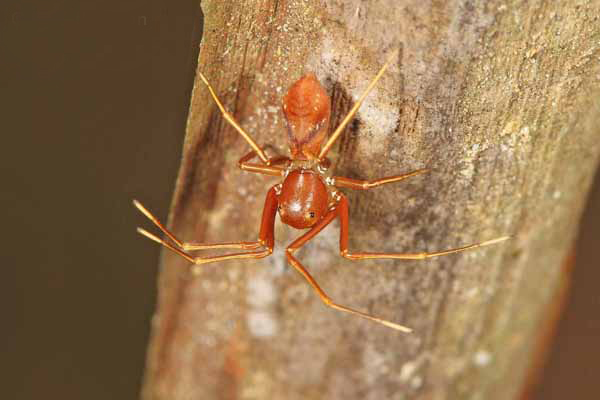
Ant-mimic Amyciaea sp., Karnataka, India

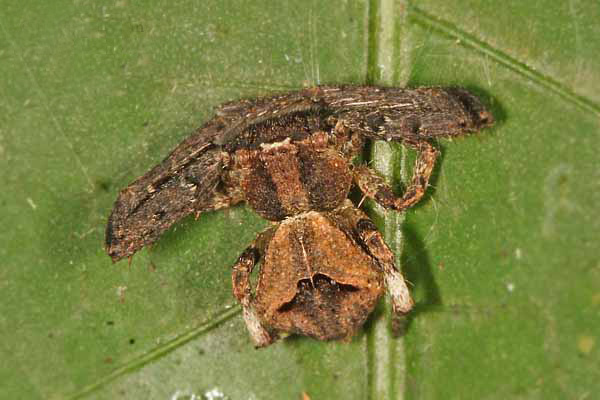
Angaeus sp.; Karnataka, India

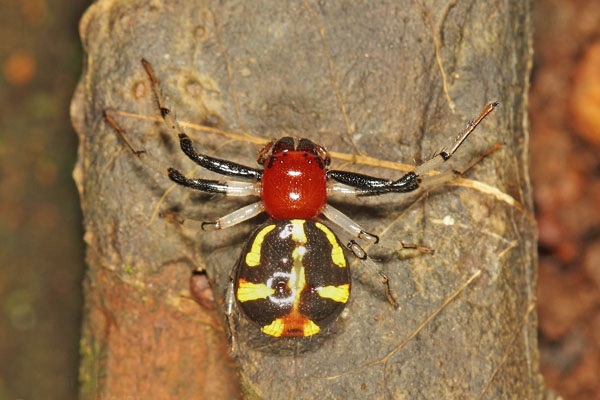
Camaricus sp.; Goa, India

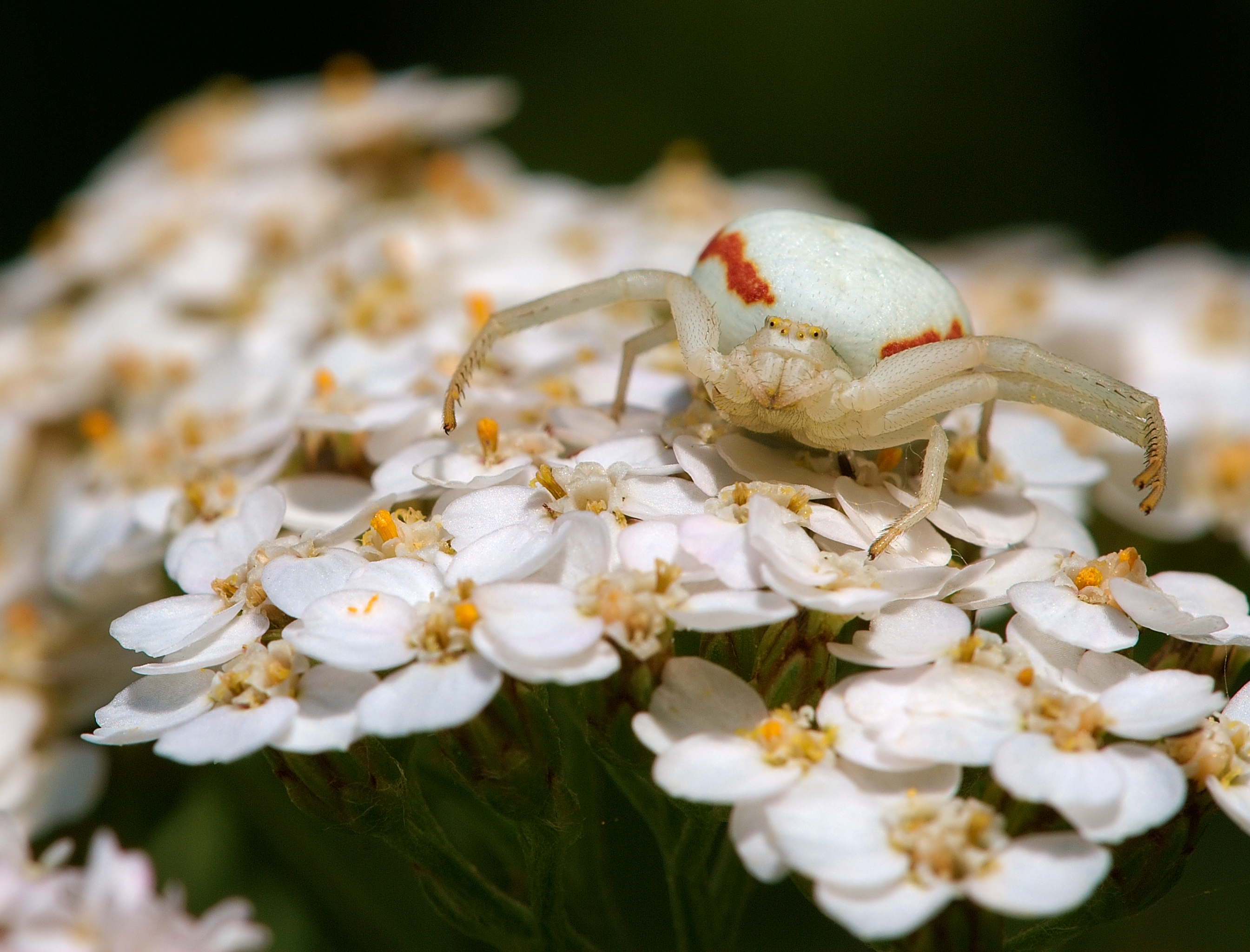
female Misumena vatia

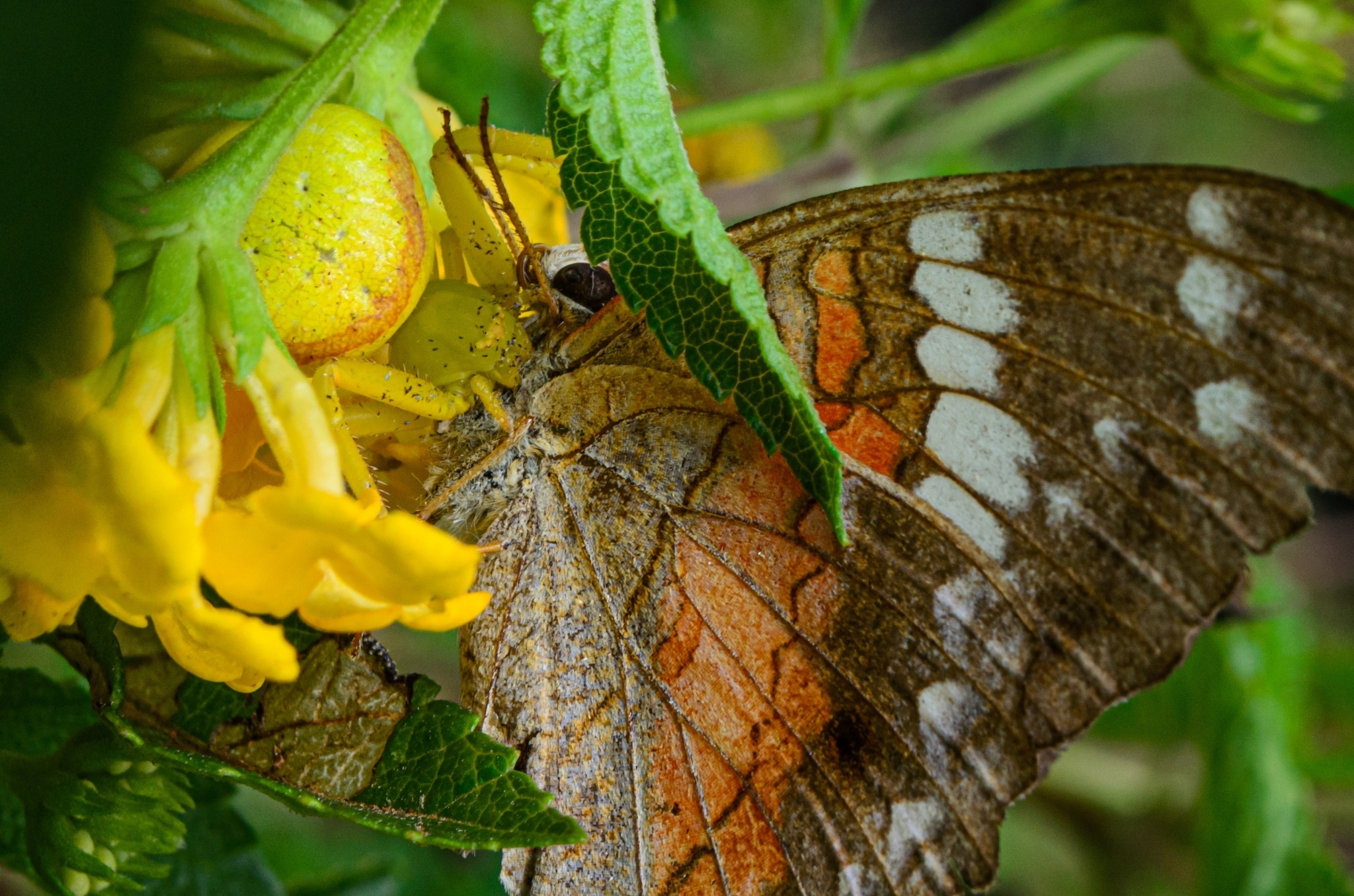
Misumenops calinurus consuming a Anartia amathea butterfly Porto Alegre, Brazil

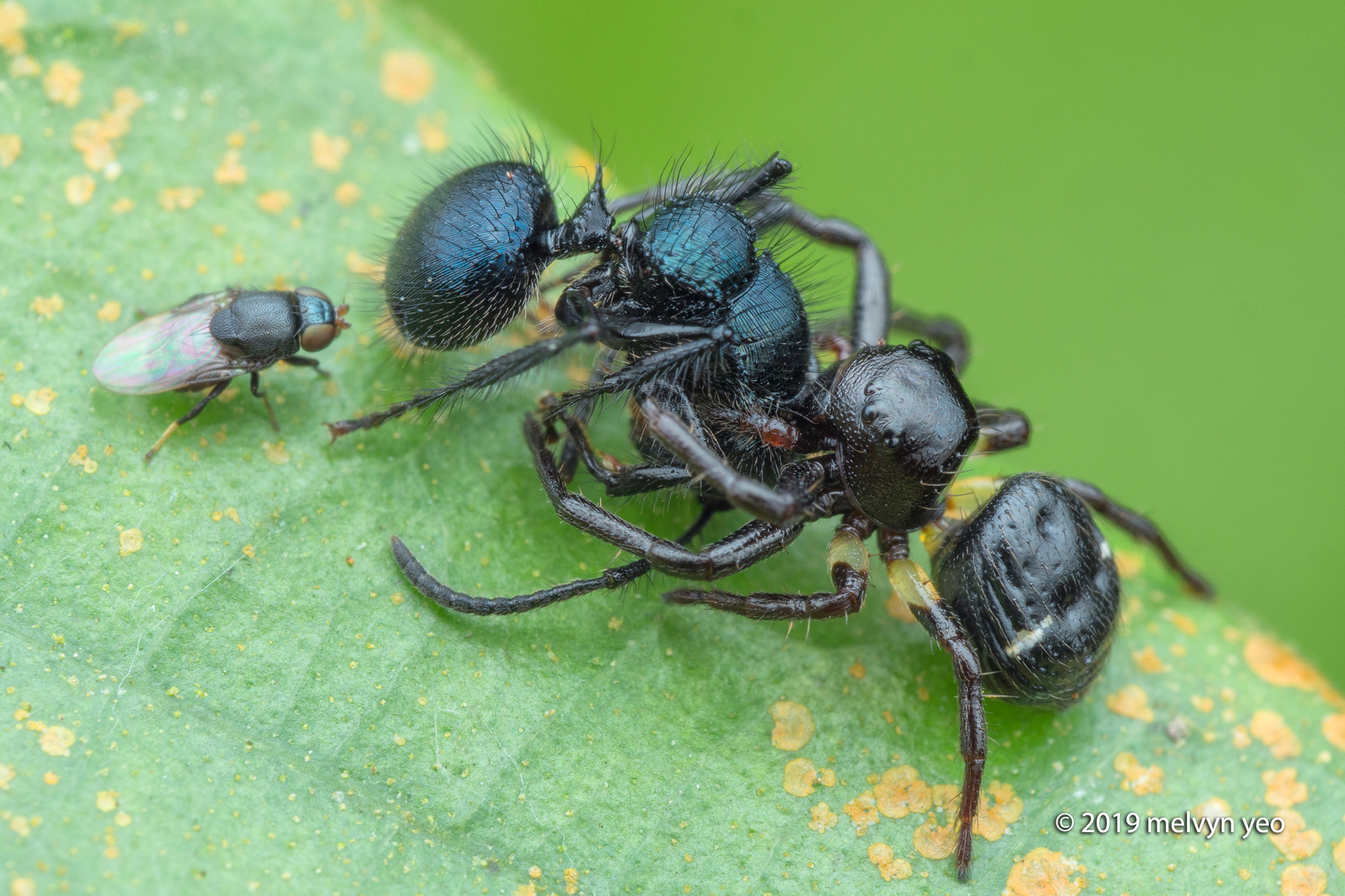
Nyctimus bistriatus (right) with ant prey and scavenging fly; Indonesia

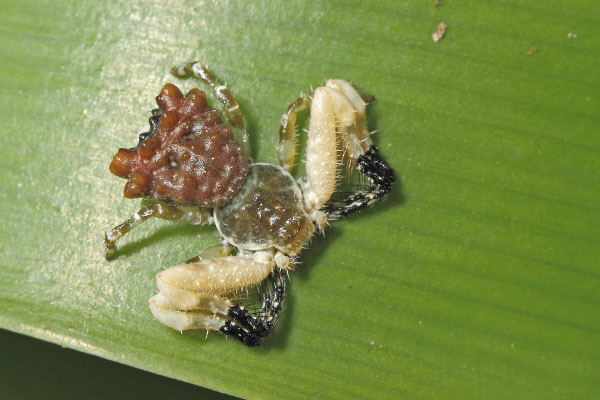
Phyrnarachne sp. mimicking bird-dropping, Karnataka, India

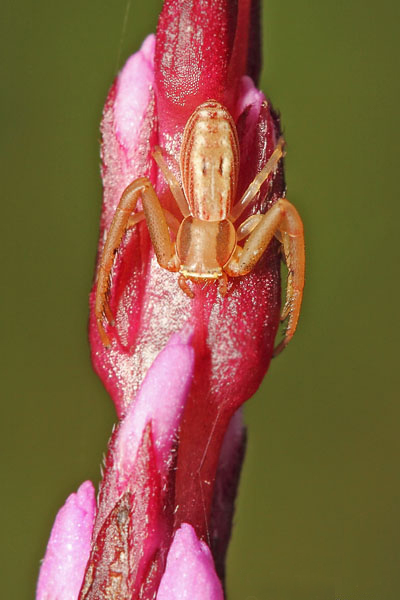
Runcinia sp., Goa, India

As of January 2026, 172 genera and 2,195 species were included in this family:

- Acentroscelus Simon, 1886 – South America
- Acrotmarus Tang & Li, 2012 – China
- Alcimochthes Simon, 1886 – China, Japan, Taiwan, Malaysia, Singapore, Vietnam
- Amyciaea Simon, 1886 – Ivory Coast, Sierra Leone, Indonesia, Singapore, Vietnam, India, Australia, New Guinea
- Angaeus Thorell, 1881 – Asia
- Ansiea Lehtinen, 2004 – Africa, Saudi Arabia, Sao Tomé
- Ansistaria Sherwood, 2022 – Africa
- Aphantochilus O. Pickard-Cambridge, 1871 – Argentina, Brazil
- Apyretina Strand, 1929 – Madagascar
- Australomisidia Szymkowiak, 2014 – Australia
- Avelis Simon, 1895 – South Africa
- Bassaniana Strand, 1928 – China, Japan, Korea, Europe, North America
- Bassaniodes Pocock, 1903 – Egypt, West Africa, Asia, Europe
- Boliscus Thorell, 1891 – Asia, New Caledonia
- Bomis L. Koch, 1874 – India, Australia
- Bonapruncinia Benoit, 1977 – St. Helena
- Boomerangiana Szymkowiak & Sherwood, 2021 – Australia
- Borboropactus Simon, 1884 – Africa, Asia, Papua New Guinea
- Bucranium O. Pickard-Cambridge, 1881 – Cuba, Guatemala, Mexico, South America
- Camaricus Thorell, 1887 – Africa, China, Indonesia, Philippines, Vietnam, Bangladesh, India, New Caledonia
- Cebrenninus Simon, 1887 – Asia, West Africa
- Ceraarachne Keyserling, 1880 – Brazil, Colombia
- Cetratus Kulczyński, 1911 – Australia, New Guinea
- Coenypha Simon, 1895 – Argentina, Chile
- Coriarachne Thorell, 1870 – China, Japan, Korea, Caucasus, Turkey, Russia, North America
- Corynethrix L. Koch, 1876 – Australia
- Cozyptila Lehtinen & Marusik, 2005 – Vietnam, Caucasus, Turkey, Europe
- Crockeria Benjamin, 2016 – Indonesia, Malaysia
- Cymbacha L. Koch, 1874 – Sri Lanka, Australia, New Guinea
- Cymbachina Bryant, 1933 – New Zealand
- Cynathea Simon, 1895 – Africa
- Cyriogonus Simon, 1886 – Madagascar
- Deltoclita Simon, 1887 – Brazil, Peru
- Demogenes Thorell, 1895 – Indonesia, India, New Guinea, Vanuatu
- Diaea Thorell, 1869 – Africa, Asia, Russia, United States, Oceania, Colombia
- Dietopsa Strand, 1932 – India
- Dimizonops Pocock, 1903 – Yemen
- Diplotychus Simon, 1903 – Madagascar
- Domatha Simon, 1895 – Philippines, New Guinea
- Ebelingia Lehtinen, 2004 – China, Japan, Korea, Russia
- Ebrechtella Dahl, 1907 – Asia, Russia, Portugal
- Emplesiogonus Simon, 1903 – Madagascar
- Epicadinus Simon, 1895 – Trinidad and Tobago, Panama, Mexico, South America
- Epicadus Simon, 1895 – Mexico to South America
- Epidius Thorell, 1877 – Africa, Asia
- Erissoides Mello-Leitão, 1929 – Brazil
- Erissus Simon, 1895 – Brazil, Peru, Venezuela
- Felsina Simon, 1895 – Cameroon, Senegal, Sierra Leone
- Firmicus Simon, 1895 – Africa, Vietnam, Iran, Israel, Spain, France
- Geraesta Simon, 1889 – Africa
- Gnoerichia Dahl, 1907 – Cameroon
- Haedanula Caporiacco, 1941 – Ethiopia
- Haplotmarus Simon, 1909 – Vietnam
- Hedana L. Koch, 1874 – Indonesia, Malaysia, Myanmar, Sri Lanka, Oceania, Venezuela
- Henriksenia Lehtinen, 2004 – Indonesia, Malaysia, Singapore, Papua New Guinea
- Herbessus Simon, 1903 – Madagascar
- Heriaesynaema Caporiacco, 1939 – Ethiopia
- Heriaeus Simon, 1875 – Africa, Asia, Europe
- Heterogriffus Platnick, 1976 – Angola, Democratic Republic of the Congo, Uganda
- Hewittia Lessert, 1928 – Africa
- Hexommulocymus Caporiacco, 1955 – Venezuela
- Holopelus Simon, 1886 – Africa, Indonesia, India, Sri Lanka
- Ibana Benjamin, 2014 – China, Indonesia, Malaysia
- Indosmodicinus Sen, Saha & Raychaudhuri, 2010 – China, India
- Indoxysticus Benjamin & Jaleel, 2010 – China, India, Sri Lanka
- Iphoctesis Simon, 1903 – Madagascar
- Isala L. Koch, 1876 – Australia
- Isaloides F. O. Pickard-Cambridge, 1900 – Cuba, Hispaniola, Panama, Mexico
- Kryptochroma Machado, 2021 – Brazil, Colombia, French Guiana
- Lampertia Strand, 1907 – Madagascar
- Latifrons Kulczyński, 1911 – Indonesia
- Ledouxia Lehtinen, 2004 – Mauritius, Réunion
- Loxobates Thorell, 1877 – Asia
- Loxoporetes Kulczyński, 1911 – Indonesia, Australia
- Lycopus Thorell, 1895 – China, Japan, Indonesia, Myanmar, Singapore, India, New Guinea
- Lysiteles Simon, 1895 – Asia, Russia
- Massuria Thorell, 1887 – China, Japan, Myanmar, India
- Mastira Thorell, 1891 – Asia, Australia, Samoa
- Mecaphesa Simon, 1900 – North America, Chile, Galapagos
- Megapyge Caporiacco, 1947 – Guyana
- Metadiaea Mello-Leitão, 1929 – Brazil
- Micromisumenops Tang & Li, 2010 – China
- Misumena Latreille, 1804 – Africa, Asia, Europe, United States, Mexico, South America, New Guinea, Papua New Guinea
- Misumenoides F. O. Pickard-Cambridge, 1900 – India, North to South America
- Misumenops F. O. Pickard-Cambridge, 1900 – Africa, Asia, North America
- Misumessus Banks, 1904 – Bermuda, Dominica, Puerto Rico, North America, Grenadines?
- Modysticus Gertsch, 1953 – Mexico, United States
- Monaeses Thorell, 1869 – Africa, Asia, Bulgaria, Ukraine, Greece, Australia, Guyana
- Musaeus Thorell, 1890 – Indonesia
- Mystaria Simon, 1895 – Africa
- Narcaeus Thorell, 1890 – Indonesia
- Nyctimus Thorell, 1877 – South Africa, Indonesia, Malaysia, Thailand, Borneo
- Ocyllus Thorell, 1887 – Myanmar
- Onocolus Simon, 1895 – South America
- Ostanes Simon, 1895 – Ivory Coast, Sierra Leone
- Oxytate L. Koch, 1878 – Africa, Asia, Russia, Australia
- Ozyptila Simon, 1864 – Africa, Asia, Europe, North America
- Pactactes Simon, 1895 – Eastern Africa, South Africa, Ivory Coast
- Pagida Simon, 1895 – Indonesia, Thailand, India, Sri Lanka, Borneo
- Parabomis Kulczyński, 1901 – Africa
- Parasmodix Jézéquel, 1966 – Africa
- Parastrophius Simon, 1903 – Cameroon, Equatorial Guinea, Pakistan
- Parasynema F. O. Pickard-Cambridge, 1900 – Guatemala
- Paratobias F. O. Pickard-Cambridge, 1900 – Honduras, Panama, Mexico
- Pasias Simon, 1895 – Philippines, India
- Pasiasula Roewer, 1942 – Equatorial Guinea
- Phaenopoma Simon, 1895 – South Africa, Senegal, Sierra Leone
- Pharta Thorell, 1891 – Asia
- Pherecydes O. Pickard-Cambridge, 1883 – Africa
- Philodamia Thorell, 1895 – China, Myanmar, Singapore, Bhutan
- Philogaeus Simon, 1895 – Brazil, Chile
- Phireza Simon, 1886 – Brazil
- Phrynarachne Thorell, 1869 – Africa, Asia, New Guinea, Vanuatu, Moluccas
- Physoplatys Simon, 1895 – Paraguay
- Pistius Simon, 1875 – Asia, Russia
- Plastonomus Simon, 1903 – Madagascar
- Platyarachne Keyserling, 1880 – Brazil, French Guiana, Peru
- Platythomisus Doleschall, 1859 – Africa, Asia
- Poecilothomisus Simon, 1895 – Australia
- Porropis L. Koch, 1876 – Angola, Australia, New Guinea
- Prepotelus Simon, 1898 – Mauritius, Réunion
- Psammitis Menge, 1876 – Asia, Europe, Cuba, North America, North Africa
- Pseudamyciaea Simon, 1905 – Indonesia
- Pseudoporrhopis Simon, 1886 – Madagascar
- Pycnaxis Simon, 1895 – Asia
- Pyresthesis Butler, 1880 – Madagascar
- Rangkayo Dhiya'ulhaq & Benjamin, 2025 – Indonesia
- Reinickella Dahl, 1907 – Indonesia
- Rejanellus Lise, 2005 – Cuba, Hispaniola, Puerto Rico
- Rhaebobates Thorell, 1881 – New Guinea
- Runcinia Simon, 1875 – Africa, Asia, Russia, Spain, Australia, New Guinea
- Runcinioides Mello-Leitão, 1929 – Argentina, Brazil, French Guiana
- Saccodomus Rainbow, 1900 – Australia
- Scopticus Simon, 1895 – Indonesia
- Sidymella Strand, 1942 – Australia, New Zealand, South America
- Simorcus Simon, 1895 – Africa, China, Yemen
- Sinothomisus Tang, Yin, Griswold & Peng, 2006 – China
- Smodicinodes Ono, 1993 – China, Malaysia, Thailand
- Smodicinus Simon, 1895 – Africa
- Soelteria Dahl, 1907 – Madagascar
- Spilosynema Tang & Li, 2010 – China
- Spinaarachne Machado, 2025 – Australia
- Spiracme Menge, 1876 – Asia, Eastern Europe, North America
- Stephanopis O. Pickard-Cambridge, 1869 – China, Indonesia, Oceania
- Stephanopoides Keyserling, 1880 – Panama, South America
- Stiphropella Lawrence, 1952 – South Africa
- Stiphropus Gerstaecker, 1873 – Africa, Asia
- Strigoplus Simon, 1886 – China, Indonesia, Malaysia, Myanmar, India
- Strophius Keyserling, 1880 – Mexico to Paraguay
- Sylligma Simon, 1895 – Africa
- Synaemops Mello-Leitão, 1929 – Argentina, Brazil
- Synalus Simon, 1895 – Australia
- Synema Simon, 1864 – Worldwide except Australia
- Tagulinus Simon, 1903 – Vietnam
- Tagulis Simon, 1895 – Africa, Sri Lanka
- Talaus Simon, 1886 – South Africa, Asia
- Tarrocanus Simon, 1895 – Sri Lanka
- Taypaliito Barrion & Litsinger, 1995 – Philippines
- Tharpyna L. Koch, 1874 – Indonesia, India, Australia
- Tharrhalea L. Koch, 1875 – Madagascar, Indonesia, Philippines, Oceania
- Thomisops Karsch, 1879 – Africa, China
- Thomisus Walckenaer, 1805 – Worldwide
- Titidiops Mello-Leitão, 1929 – Brazil
- Titidius Simon, 1895 – South America
- Tmarus Simon, 1875 – Worldwide
- Trichopagis Simon, 1886 – Gabon, Madagascar, South Africa, Guinea
- Ulocymus Simon, 1886 – Argentina, Brazil
- Uraarachne Keyserling, 1880 – South America
- Wechselia Dahl, 1907 – Argentina
- Xysticus C. L. Koch, 1835 – Worldwide
- Zametopina Simon, 1909 – China, Thailand, Vietnam
- Zygometis Simon, 1901 – Thailand to Australia

== See also ==
- Philodromidae, also called crab spiders
