= Haplotmarus =

Scientific classification
- Kingdom: Animalia
- Phylum: Arthropoda
- Subphylum: Chelicerata
- Class: Arachnida
- Order: Araneae
- Infraorder: Araneomorphae
- Family: Thomisidae
- Genus: Haplotmarus; Simon, 1909
- Species: H. plumatilis

Binomial name
- Haplotmarus plumatilis Simon, 1909

Monotypic genus of spiders

Haplotmarus is a monotypic genus of Asian crab spiders containing the single species, Haplotmarus plumatilis. It was first described by Eugène Louis Simon in 1909, and is found in Vietnam.

== See also ==
- List of Thomisidae species
