= Ulocymus =

Scientific classification
- Kingdom: Animalia
- Phylum: Arthropoda
- Subphylum: Chelicerata
- Class: Arachnida
- Order: Araneae
- Infraorder: Araneomorphae
- Family: Thomisidae
- Genus: Ulocymus; Simon

Type species
- Ulocymus gounellei

Species
- Ulocymus gounellei Simon, 1886; Ulocymus intermedius Mello-Leitão, 1929; Ulocymus muricatus (Mello-Leitão, 1942); Ulocymus sulcatus Mello-Leitão, 1929

Genus of spiders

Ulocymus is a genus of spiders in the family Thomisidae. It was first described in 1886 by Simon. As of 2017, it contains 4 species from Brazil and Argentina.
