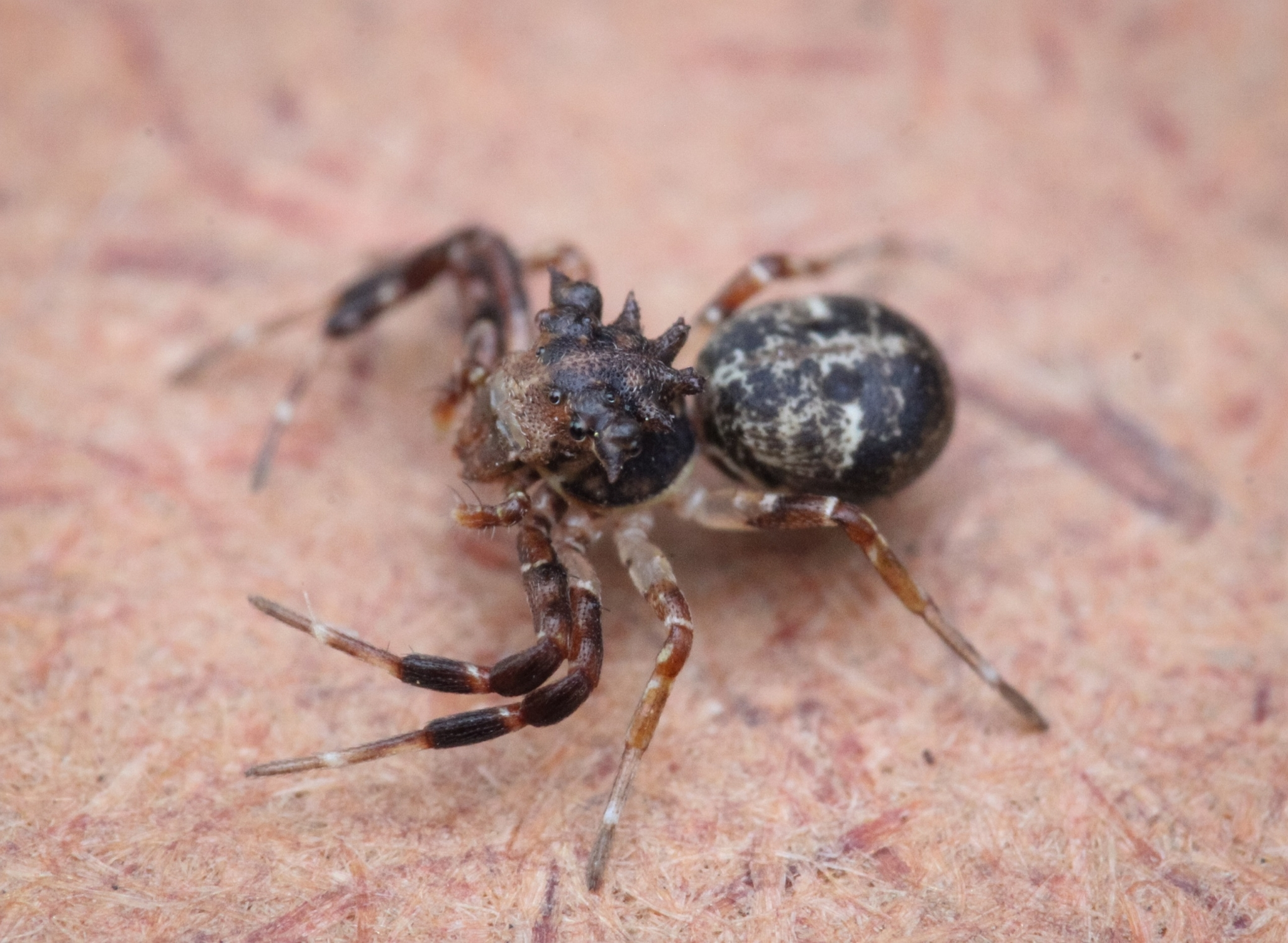
- from Zimbabwe
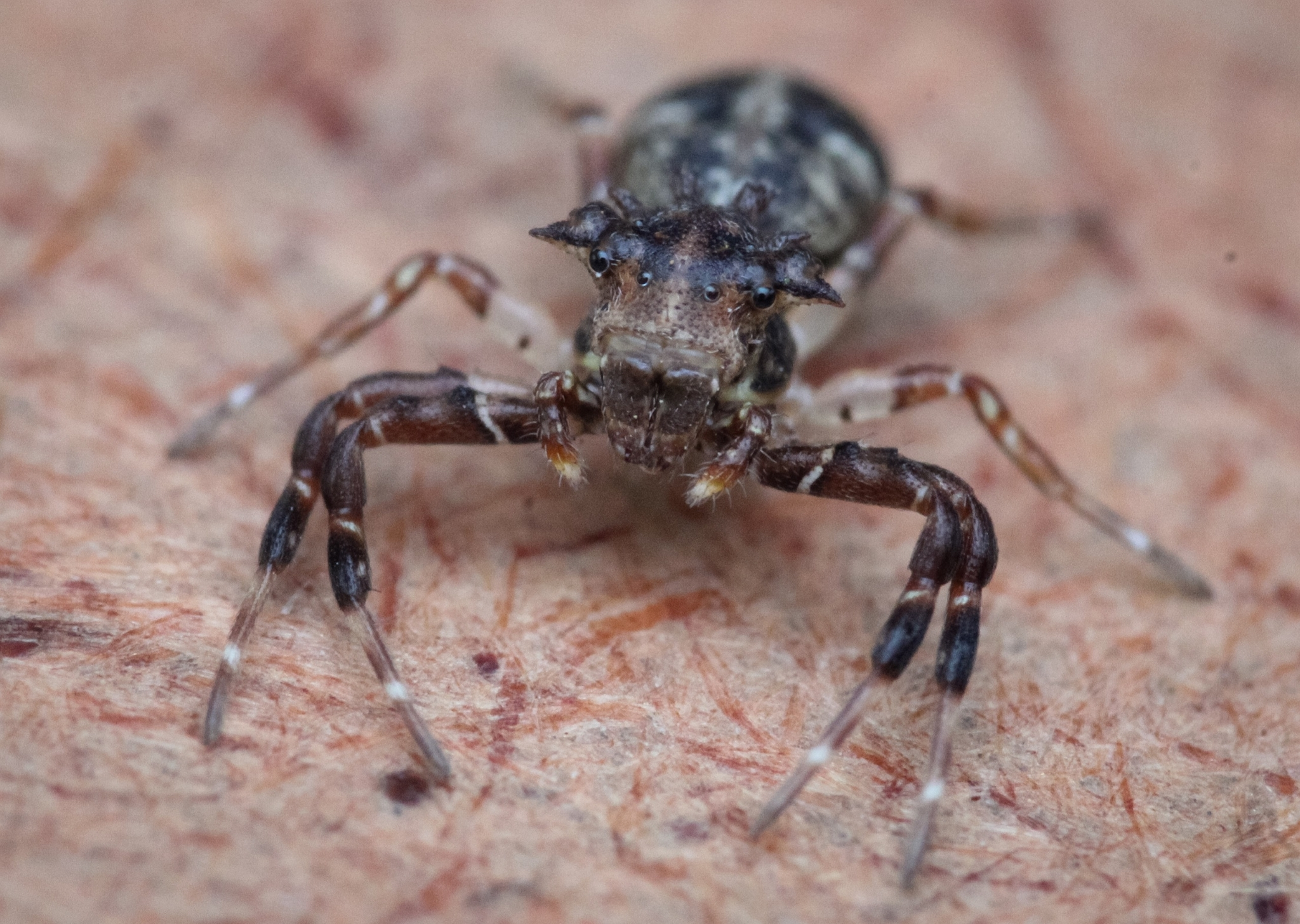

Scientific classification
- Kingdom: Animalia
- Phylum: Arthropoda
- Subphylum: Chelicerata
- Class: Arachnida
- Order: Araneae
- Infraorder: Araneomorphae
- Family: Thomisidae
- Genus: Smodicinus
- Species: S. coroniger

Binomial name
- Smodicinus coroniger Simon, 1895

Synonyms
- Smodicinus affinis Lessert, 1943

= Smodicinus =

Crowned Smodicinus crab spider

Species of crab spider

Smodicinus coroniger is a species of crab spider in the family Thomisidae. It is the only species in the genus Smodicinus and is endemic to Africa. It is commonly known as the crowned Smodicinus crab spider.

== Etymology ==
The specific name coroniger derives from the Latin corona (crown) and the suffix -iger (bearing), referring to the distinctive crown-like crest on the carapace.

== Distribution ==
Smodicinus coroniger has been recorded from Sierra Leone, Ivory Coast, Democratic Republic of the Congo, and South Africa. In South Africa, it occurs in the Eastern Cape, KwaZulu-Natal, and Limpopo provinces.

== Habitat ==
Smodicinus coroniger is a free-living plant-dweller found primarily on trees in savanna, Indian Ocean Coastal Belt, and thicket biomes. It inhabits elevations ranging from 1 to 1,097 metres above sea level.

== Description ==
Smodicinus coroniger is a small crab spider with a total length of 3–6 mm for both females and males. The species is easily recognised by its highly distinctive carapace, which is elevated to form a prominent crest directed posteriorly. This crest is divided into six pointed tubercles that are flattened above: two tubercles point backwards (posteriorly) and four point sideways (laterally).

The carapace is pale brown, suffused with yellow, and sometimes bears white markings on the edges. The sternum and mouthparts are yellowish-brown. Both eye rows are recurved, with the lateral eyes being larger than the median eyes.

The opisthosoma is blackish and mottled with white or displays distinct white markings. The legs are the same color as the carapace and are banded with white.

== Behaviour and life cycle ==
Adult males have been recorded from November to March, while females occur from October to January. The species is considered very rare and is mainly sampled from trees.

== Conservation status ==
Smodicinus coroniger is listed as Least Concern in South Africa due to its wide geographical range across multiple African countries. The species is protected in eight protected areas and faces no known threats.

== Taxonomy ==
The genus Smodicinus was established by Eugène Simon in 1895, with S. coroniger as the type species. Smodicinus affinis Lessert, 1943 was later synonymised with S. coroniger by Dippenaar-Schoeman in 1980.
