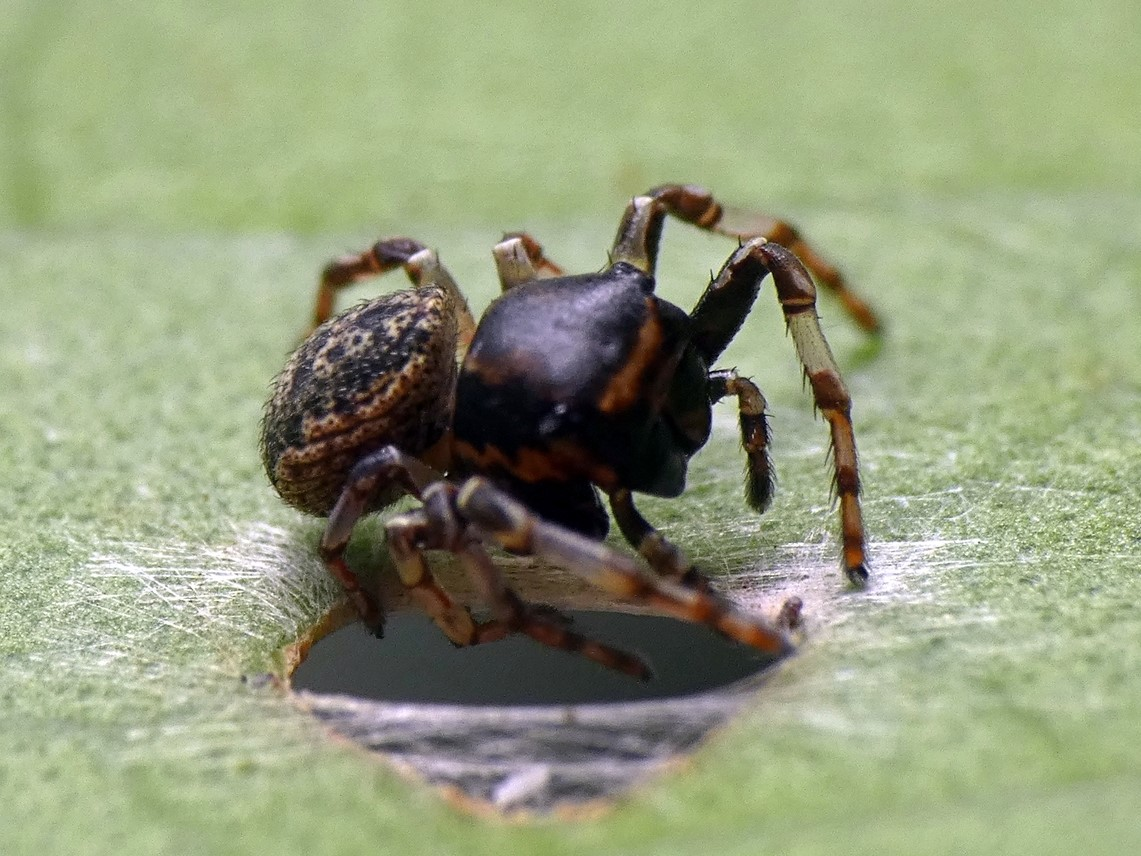
- Porropis callipoda

Scientific classification
- Kingdom: Animalia
- Phylum: Arthropoda
- Subphylum: Chelicerata
- Class: Arachnida
- Order: Araneae
- Infraorder: Araneomorphae
- Family: Thomisidae
- Genus: Porropis; Koch

Type species
- Porropis flavifrons

Species
- 6, see text

= Porropis =

Genus of spiders

Porropis is a genus of spiders in the family Thomisidae. It was erected in 1876 by L. Koch. As of 2017, it contains 6 species.

== Species ==
Porropis comprises the following species:

- Porropis callipoda Thorell, 1881 – Australia (Queensland), New Guinea
- Porropis flavifrons L. Koch, 1876 – Australia (Queensland)
- Porropis homeyeri (Karsch, 1880) – Angola
- Porropis nitidula Thorell, 1881 – Australia (Queensland)
- Porropis poecila Kulczyński, 1911 – New Guinea
- Porropis tristicula Thorell, 1881 – Australia (Queensland)
