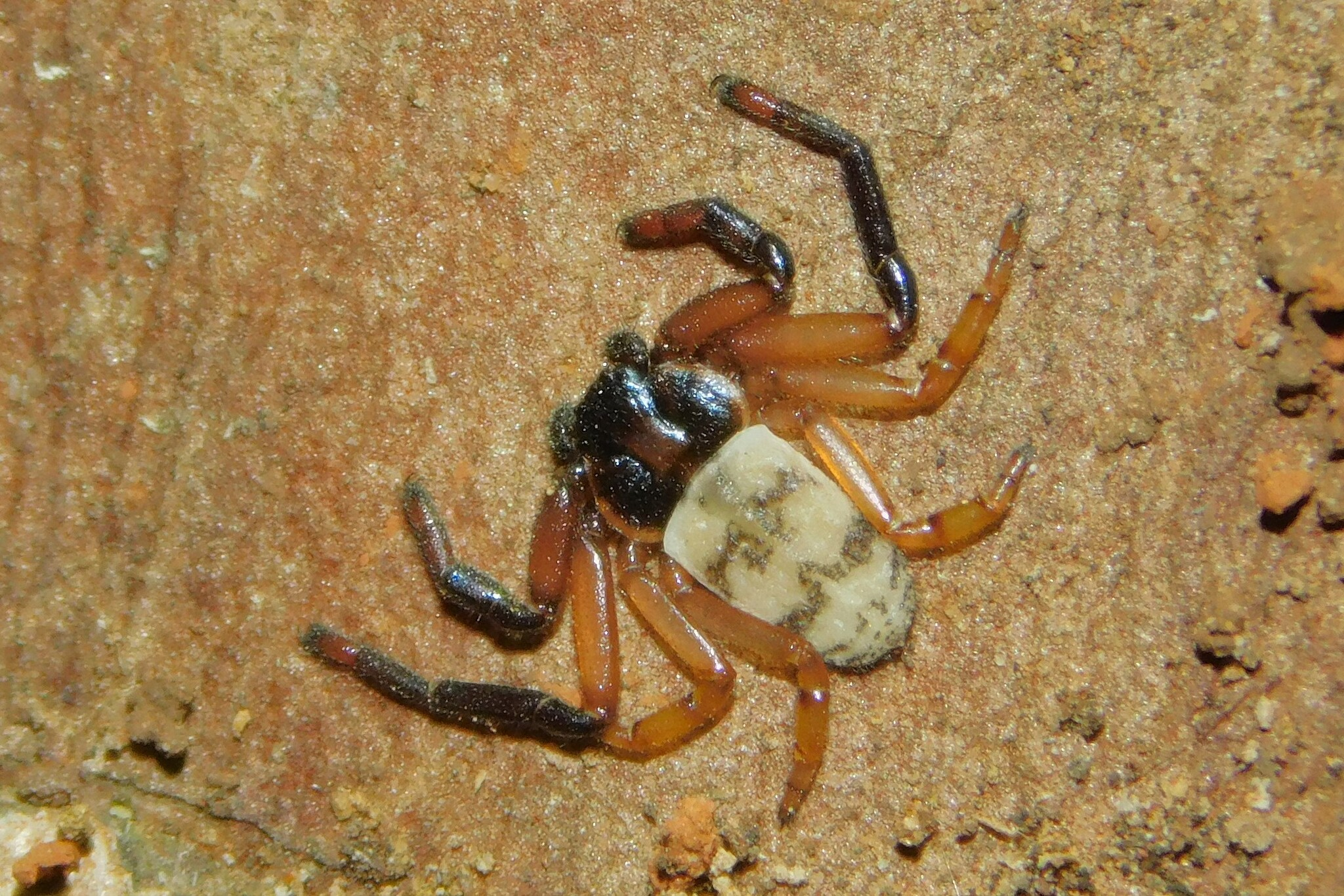
- Heterogriffus berlandi in Bugoma Forest, Western Uganda.

Scientific classification
- Kingdom: Animalia
- Phylum: Arthropoda
- Subphylum: Chelicerata
- Class: Arachnida
- Order: Araneae
- Infraorder: Araneomorphae
- Family: Thomisidae
- Genus: Heterogriffus; Platnick, 1976
- Species: H. berlandi

Binomial name
- Heterogriffus berlandi (Lessert, 1938)

= Heterogriffus =

Monotypic genus of spiders

Heterogriffus is a monotypic genus of African crab spiders containing the single species, Heterogriffus berlandi. It was first described by Norman I. Platnick in 1976, and is found in Africa.

== See also ==
- List of Thomisidae species
