= Haedanula =

Scientific classification
- Kingdom: Animalia
- Phylum: Arthropoda
- Subphylum: Chelicerata
- Class: Arachnida
- Order: Araneae
- Infraorder: Araneomorphae
- Family: Thomisidae
- Genus: Haedanula; Caporiacco, 1941
- Species: H. subinermis

Binomial name
- Haedanula subinermis Caporiacco, 1941

Monotypic genus of spiders

Haedanula is a monotypic genus of African crab spiders containing the single species, Haedanula subinermis. It was first described by Lodovico di Caporiacco in 1941, and is found in Ethiopia.

== See also ==
- List of Thomisidae species
