= Hexommulocymus =

Scientific classification
- Kingdom: Animalia
- Phylum: Arthropoda
- Subphylum: Chelicerata
- Class: Arachnida
- Order: Araneae
- Infraorder: Araneomorphae
- Family: Thomisidae
- Genus: Hexommulocymus; Caporiacco, 1955
- Species: H. kolosvaryi

Binomial name
- Hexommulocymus kolosvaryi Caporiacco, 1955

Monotypic genus of spiders

Hexommulocymus is a monotypic genus of South American crab spiders containing the single species, Hexommulocymus kolosvaryi. It was first described by Lodovico di Caporiacco in 1955, and is found in Venezuela.

== See also ==
- List of Thomisidae species
