= Scopticus =

Scientific classification
- Kingdom: Animalia
- Phylum: Arthropoda
- Subphylum: Chelicerata
- Class: Arachnida
- Order: Araneae
- Infraorder: Araneomorphae
- Family: Thomisidae
- Genus: Scopticus
- Species: S. herbeus

Binomial name
- Scopticus herbeus Simon, 1895

Genus of spiders

Scopticus is a genus of spiders in the family Thomisidae. It was first described in 1895 by Simon. As of 2017, it contains only one species, Scopticus herbeus, found in Java.
