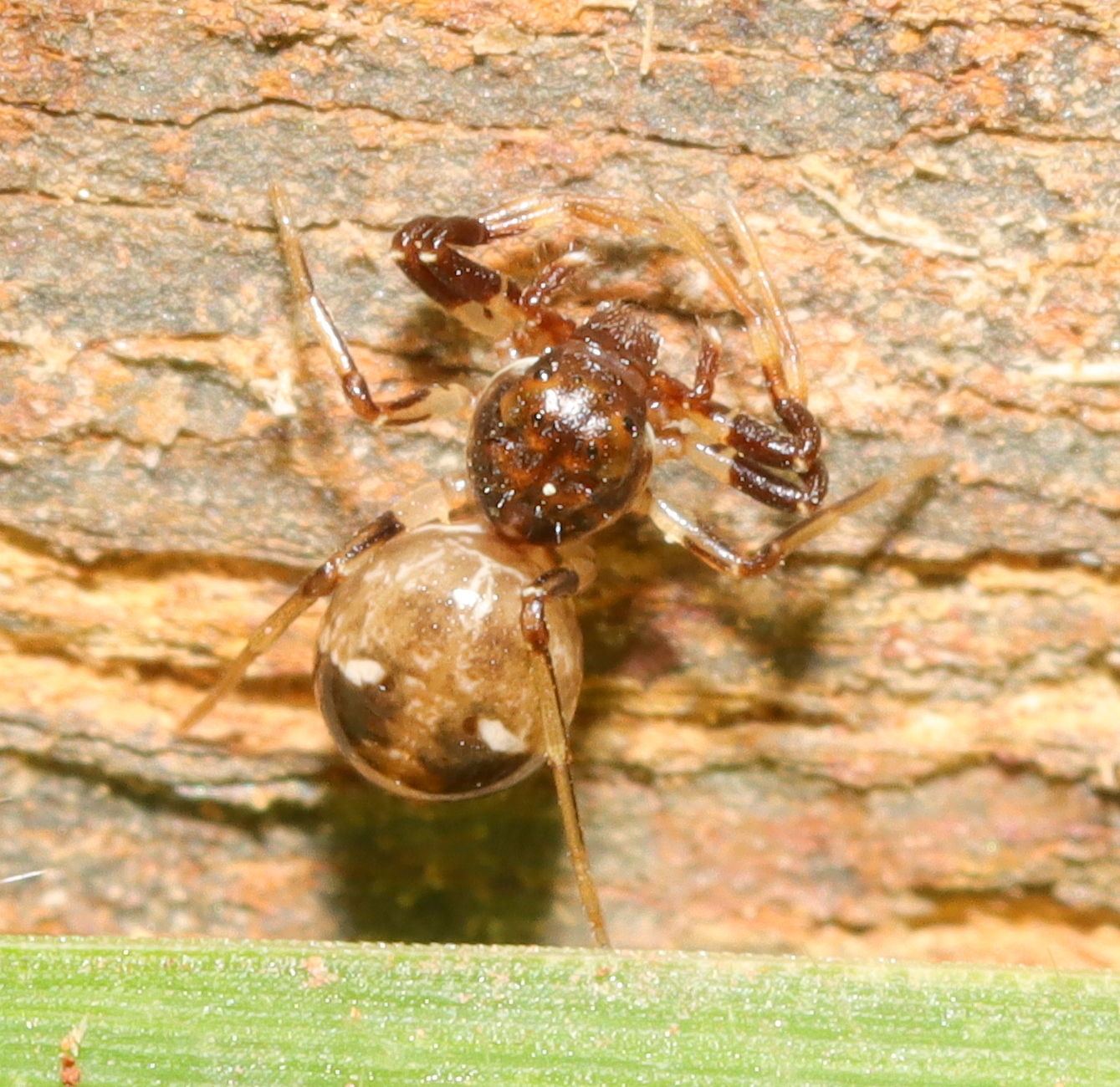

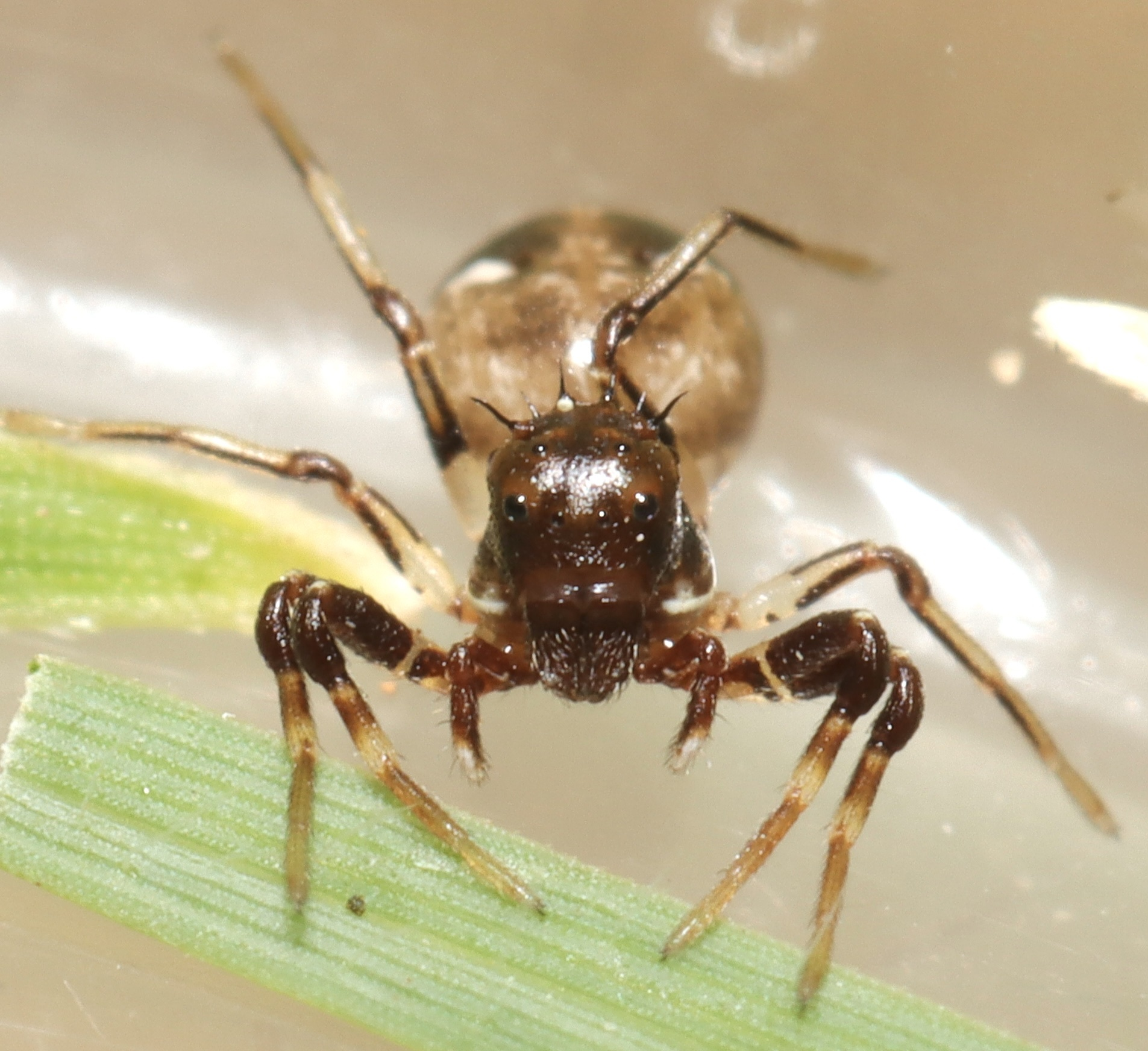

Scientific classification
- Kingdom: Animalia
- Phylum: Arthropoda
- Subphylum: Chelicerata
- Class: Arachnida
- Order: Araneae
- Infraorder: Araneomorphae
- Family: Thomisidae
- Genus: Parasmodix
- Species: P. quadrituberculata

Binomial name
- Parasmodix quadrituberculata Jézéquel, 1966

= Parasmodix =

Crowned Crab Spider

Genus of spiders

Parasmodix quadrituberculata is a species of spider in the family Thomisidae, the sole described species of the monotypic genus Parasmodix. It is found in several African countries and is commonly known as the crowned crab spider.

== Distribution ==
Parasmodix quadrituberculata is found in Cameroon, DR Congo, Ghana, Ivory Coast, Rwanda, Zimbabwe, and South Africa.

In South Africa, it is known from Gauteng, KwaZulu-Natal, Limpopo, Mpumalanga, North West, and Western Cape provinces.

== Habitat and ecology ==
These are plant dwellers and have been sampled with sweep nets from Grassland, Forest, and Savanna biomes at altitudes ranging from 10 to 1415 m. The species has also been sampled from maize fields.

== Description ==
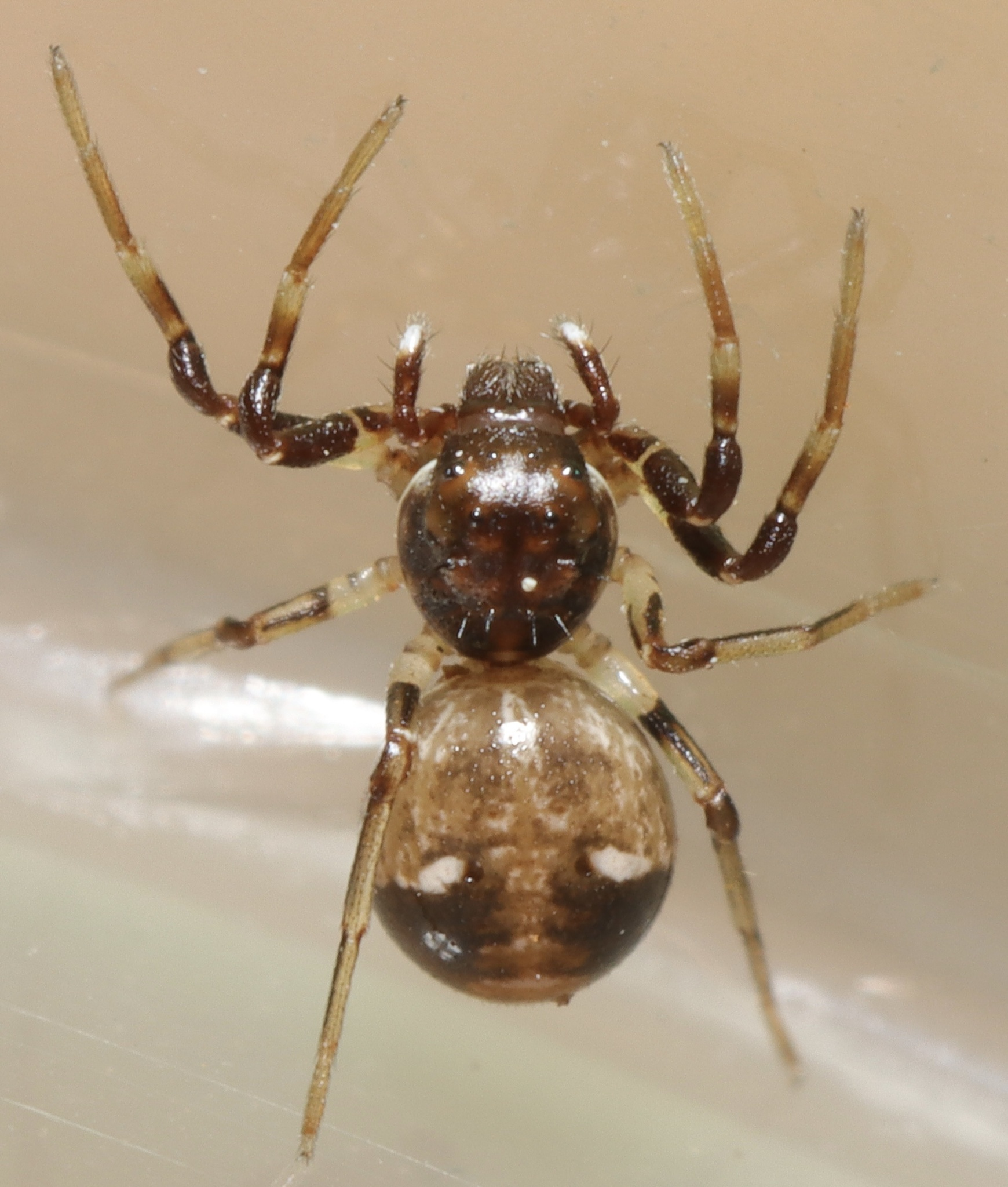

Parasmodix includes spiders characterized by a high anteriorly sloping cephalothorax that is longer than wide. Both sexes have a body length of 4-5 mm. The eyes are arranged in two rows with the median eyes closer to the lateral eyes than to each other.

The abdomen is decorated with white patches. The carapace is as wide as long with scattered short setae and a few longer setae on the truncated posterior edge of the carapace, on the clypeal edge, and between and behind the lateral eyes. The cephalic region is high, slightly convex, and sloping anteriorly. The thoracic region is truncated posteriorly.

The eyes occupy most of the carapace width in two recurved rows. The anterior eye row is slightly wider than the posterior eye row. The chelicerae have a slightly flattened dorsal surface. The cheliceral ridge has an upper edge that is rounded and slightly protruding with seven to nine inwardly curved spiniform setae.

The abdomen is oval and bluntly truncated anteriorly, about a third longer than wide. The legs are pale yellow with anterior pairs having dark brown femora and patellae. Other legs bear brown spots and lines.

== Conservation ==
Parasmodix quadrituberculata is listed as Least Concern by the South African National Biodiversity Institute due to its wide geographical range. There are no significant threats to the species. The species is recorded from eight reserves such as Roodeplaatdam Nature Reserve, Ophathe Game Reserve, Tembe Elephant Park, and Nylsvley Nature Reserve. No conservation actions are recommended.

== Taxonomy ==
Parasmodix quadrituberculata was described by Jézéquel in 1966 from the Ivory Coast. The species has not been revised but is known from both sexes.
