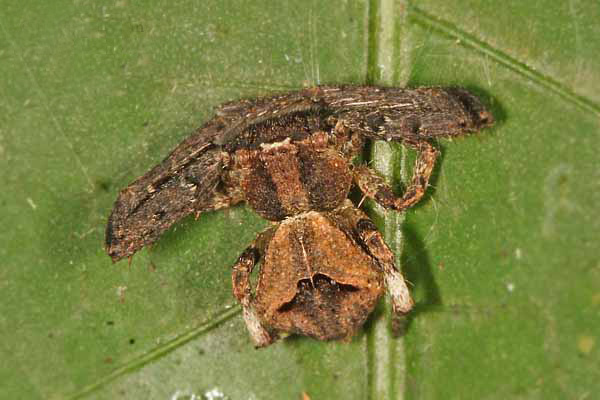

Scientific classification
- Kingdom: Animalia
- Phylum: Arthropoda
- Subphylum: Chelicerata
- Class: Arachnida
- Order: Araneae
- Infraorder: Araneomorphae
- Family: Thomisidae
- Genus: Angaeus; Thorell, 1881

Type species
- Angaeus pudicus

Species
- 12, see text

Synonyms
- Paraborboropactus

= Angaeus =

Genus of spiders

Angaeus is a genus of Asian crab spiders first described by Tamerlan Thorell in 1881. It is considered a senior synonym of Paraborboropactus.

== Species ==
As of December 2022 it contained twelve species, found in Asia:

- Angaeus canalis (Tang & Li, 2010) – China
- Angaeus christae Benjamin, 2013 – Borneo
- Angaeus comatulus Simon, 1909 – Vietnam
- Angaeus lenticulosus Simon, 1903 – China, Vietnam
- Angaeus liangweii (Tang & Li, 2010) – China
- Angaeus pentagonalis Pocock, 1901 – India (mainland, Andaman Is.)
- Angaeus pudicus Thorell, 1881 (type) – Indonesia (Moluccas, Seram Island)
- Angaeus rhombifer Thorell, 1890 – China, Myanmar, Vietnam, Malaysia, Singapore, Indonesia (Sumatra), Borneo
- Angaeus rhombus (Tang & Li, 2009) – China
- Angaeus verrucosus Benjamin, 2017 – Malaysia (Borneo)
- Angaeus xieluae (Liu, 2022) – China
- Angaeus zhengi (Tang & Li, 2009) – China

== See also ==
- List of Thomisidae species
