= Acrotmarus =

Scientific classification
- Kingdom: Animalia
- Phylum: Arthropoda
- Subphylum: Chelicerata
- Class: Arachnida
- Order: Araneae
- Infraorder: Araneomorphae
- Family: Thomisidae
- Genus: Acrotmarus; Tang & Li, 2012
- Species: A. gummosus

Binomial name
- Acrotmarus gummosus Tang & Li, 2012

Monotypic genus of spiders

Acrotmarus is a monotypic genus of Asian crab spiders containing the single species, Acrotmarus gummosus. It was first described by G. Tang & S. Q. Li in 2012, and is found in China.

== See also ==
- List of Thomisidae species
