= Smodicinodes =

Scientific classification
- Domain: Eukaryota
- Kingdom: Animalia
- Phylum: Arthropoda
- Subphylum: Chelicerata
- Class: Arachnida
- Order: Araneae
- Infraorder: Araneomorphae
- Family: Thomisidae
- Genus: Smodicinodes; Ono

Type species
- Smodicinodes kovaci

Species
- Smodicinodes hupingensis Tang, Yin & Peng, 2004 – China; Smodicinodes kovaci Ono, 1993 – Malaysia; Smodicinodes schwendingeri Benjamin, 2002 – China, Thailand; Smodicinodes yaoi Tang & Li, 2010 – China

Genus of spiders

Smodicinodes is a genus of spiders in the family Thomisidae. It was first described in 1993 by Ono. As of 2017, it contains 4 species from China.
