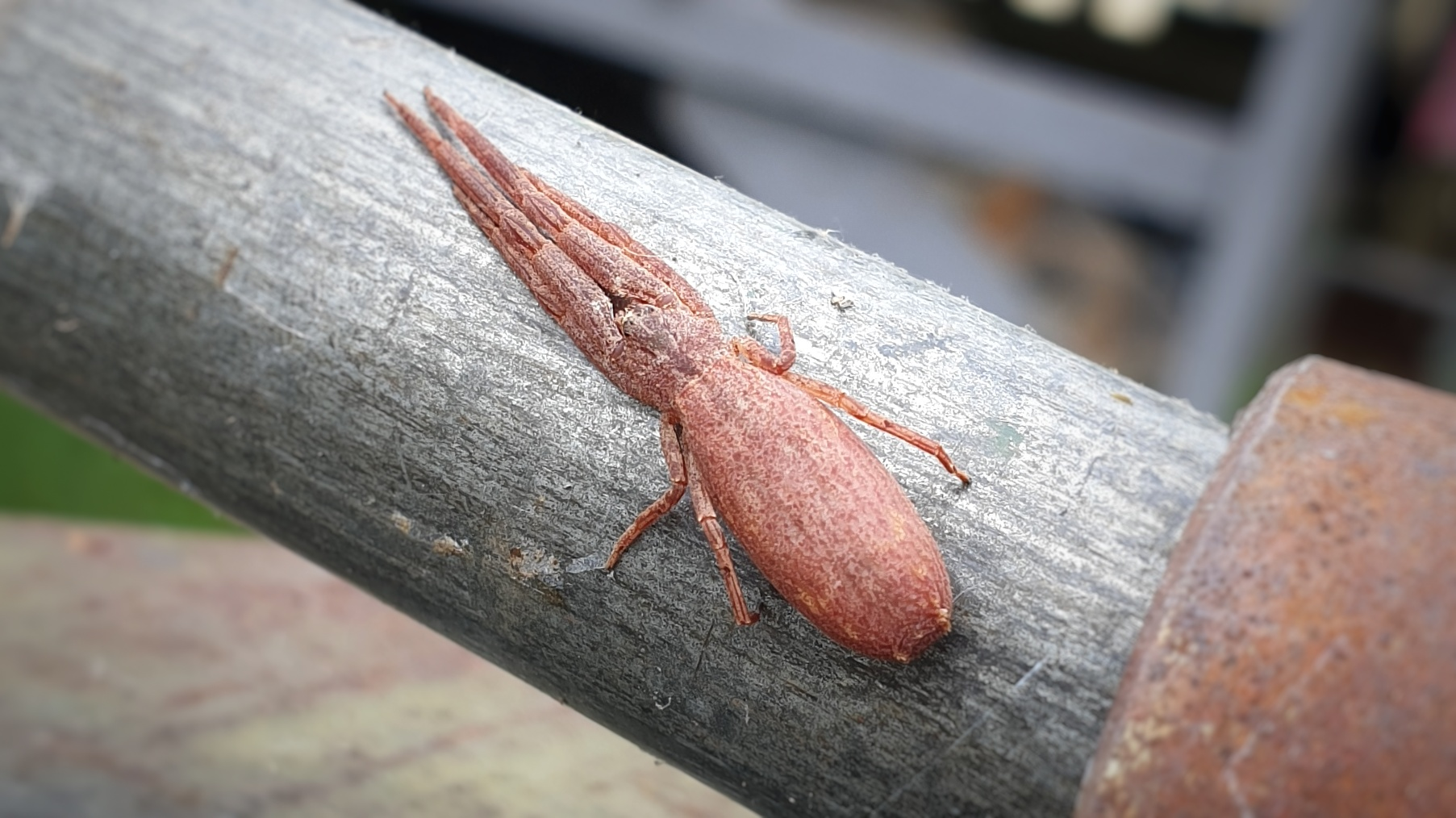

Scientific classification
- Kingdom: Animalia
- Phylum: Arthropoda
- Subphylum: Chelicerata
- Class: Arachnida
- Order: Araneae
- Infraorder: Araneomorphae
- Family: Thomisidae
- Genus: Synalus; Simon

Type species
- Synalus angustus

Species
- Synalus angustus (L. Koch, 1876) – Australia (New South Wales); Synalus terrosus Simon, 1895 – Australia (Tasmania)

= Synalus =

Genus of spiders

Synalus is a genus of Australian crab spiders first described by Eugène Simon in 1895. As of February 2019, it contains only two species from southern New South Wales and Tasmania.
