= Zametopina =

Scientific classification
- Kingdom: Animalia
- Phylum: Arthropoda
- Subphylum: Chelicerata
- Class: Arachnida
- Order: Araneae
- Infraorder: Araneomorphae
- Family: Thomisidae
- Genus: Zametopina
- Species: Z. calceata

Binomial name
- Zametopina calceata Simon, 1909

Genus of spiders

Zametopina is a genus of spiders in the family Thomisidae. It was first described in 1909 by Simon. As of 2017, it contains only one species, Zametopina calceata, found in China and Vietnam.
