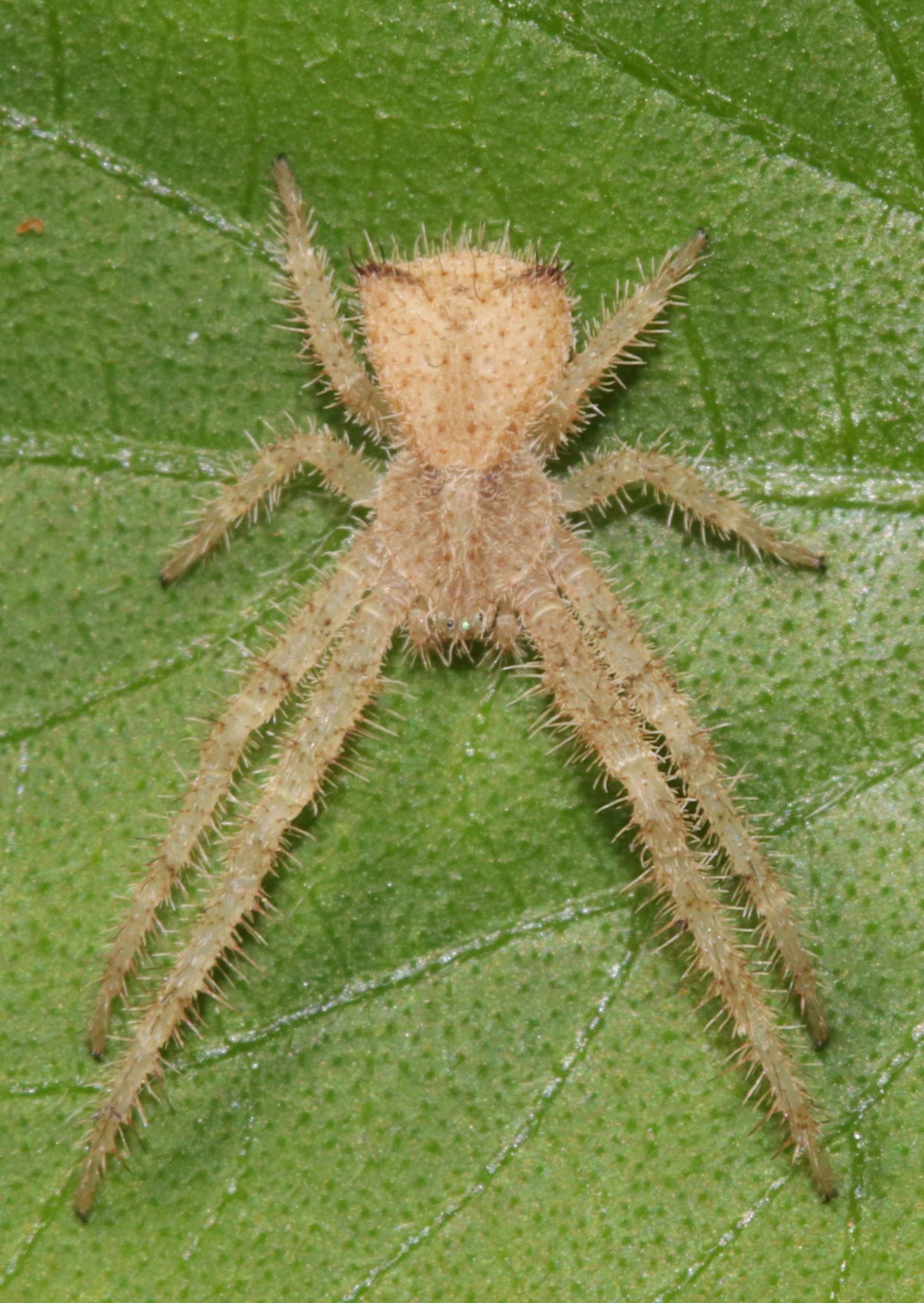
- S. hirsuta
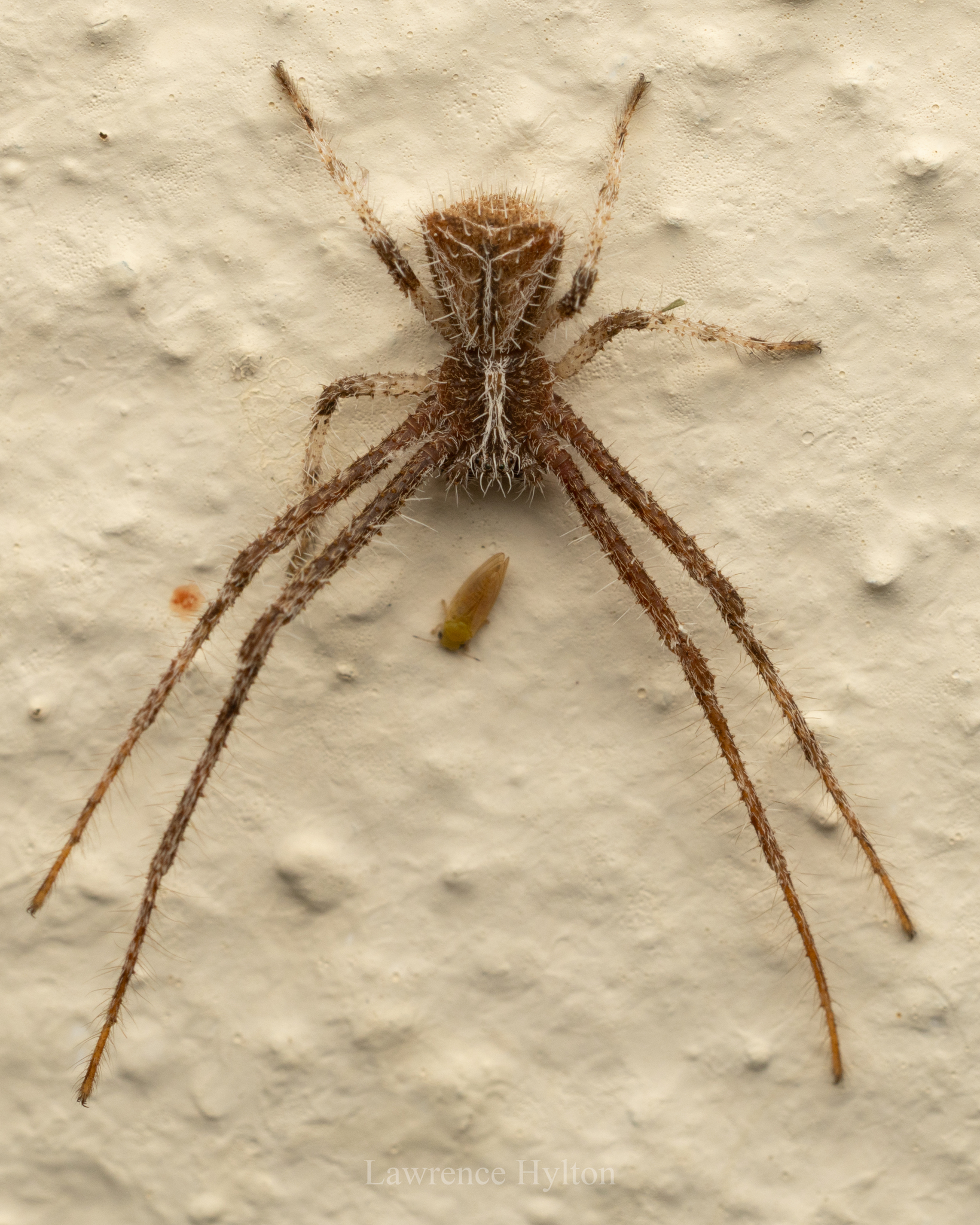
- S. aculeata

Scientific classification
- Kingdom: Animalia
- Phylum: Arthropoda
- Subphylum: Chelicerata
- Class: Arachnida
- Order: Araneae
- Infraorder: Araneomorphae
- Family: Thomisidae
- Genus: Spinaarachne; Machado, 2025

Type species
- Stephanopis hirsuta L. Koch, 1874

Species
- 3, see text

= Spinaarachne =

Genus of spiders

Spinaarachne is a genus of spiders in the family Thomisidae.

== Distribution ==
Spinaarachne is endemic to Australia.

== Etymology ==
The genus name refers to the spiny appearance of spiders in this genus.

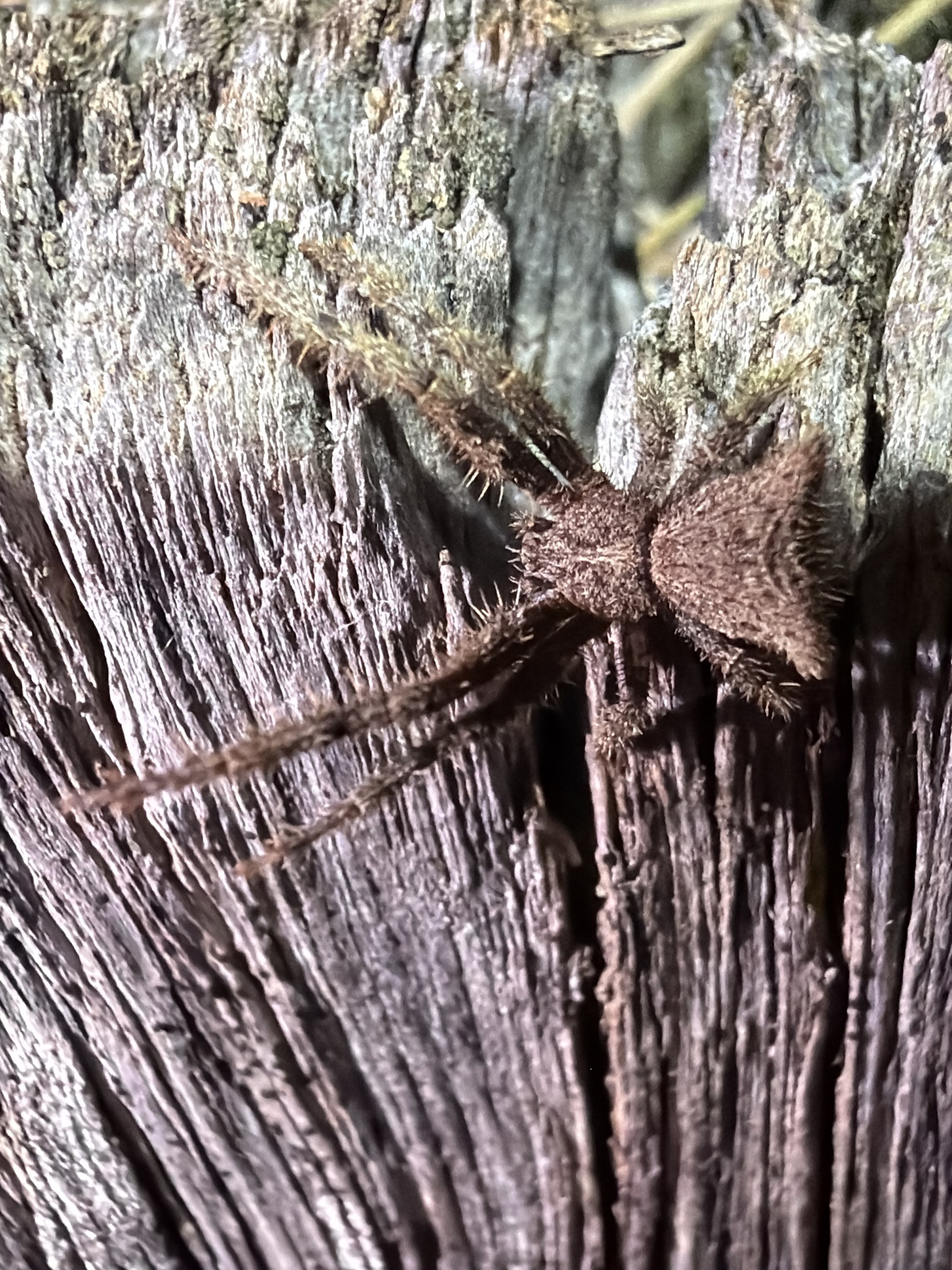
S. pilosa

== Species ==
As of January 2026, this genus includes three species:

- Spinaarachne aculeata Machado, 2025 – Australia (Western Australia, South Australia, Queensland, New South Wales)
- Spinaarachne hirsuta (L. Koch, 1874) – Australia (Queensland, New South Wales, Tasmania)
- Spinaarachne pilosa Machado, 2025 – Australia (Queensland, New South Wales, Tasmania)
