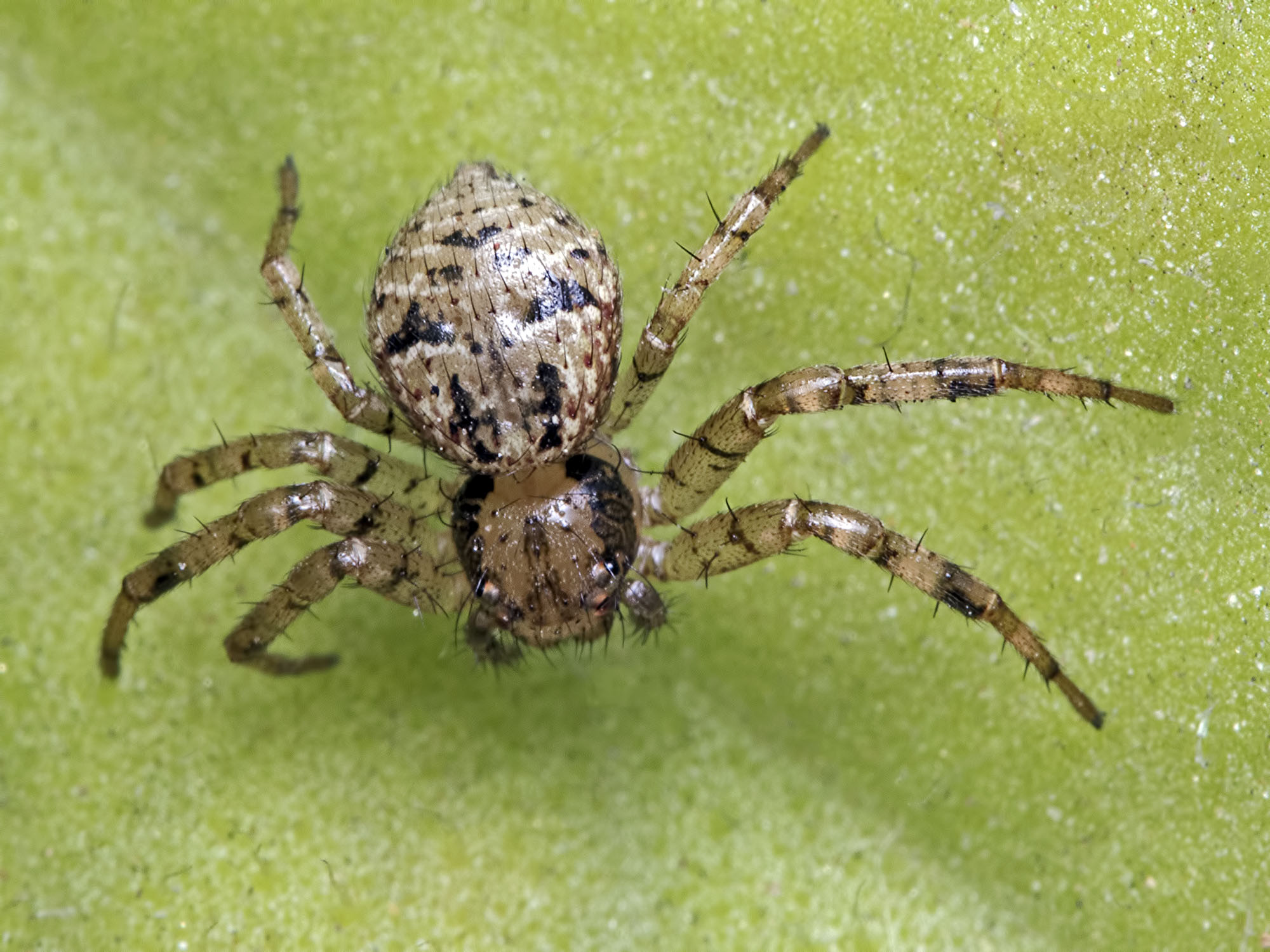
- I. minutus

Scientific classification
- Kingdom: Animalia
- Phylum: Arthropoda
- Subphylum: Chelicerata
- Class: Arachnida
- Order: Araneae
- Infraorder: Araneomorphae
- Family: Thomisidae
- Genus: Indoxysticus; Benjamin & Jaleel, 2010

Type species
- I. minutus (Tikader, 1960)

Species
- I. lumbricus Tang & Li, 2010 – China; I. minutus (Tikader, 1960) – India, Sri Lanka; I. tangi Jin & Zhang, 2012 – China

= Indoxysticus =

Genus of spiders

Indoxysticus is a genus of Asian crab spiders that was first described by S. P. Benjamin & Z. Jaleel in 2010. As of September 2020 it contains three species, all found in Asia: I. lumbricus, I. minutus, and I. tangi. The genus differs from others in its family by the oval-shaped spermathecae with well-defined chambers in females and by the broad-based embolus in males.

They live in vegetation as opposed to related genus Xysticus, which lives on the ground.
