= Spilosynema =

Scientific classification
- Domain: Eukaryota
- Kingdom: Animalia
- Phylum: Arthropoda
- Subphylum: Chelicerata
- Class: Arachnida
- Order: Araneae
- Infraorder: Araneomorphae
- Family: Thomisidae
- Genus: Spilosynema; Tang & Li, 2010

Type species
- Spilosynema ansatum Tang & Li, 2010

Species
- Spilosynema ansatum Tang & Li, 2010; Spilosynema comminum Tang & Li, 2010; Spilosynema mancum Tang & Li, 2010; Spilosynema ravum Tang & Li, 2010

Genus of spiders

Spilosynema is a genus of spiders in the Thomisidae family. It was first described in 2010 by Tang and Li. As of 2024, it contained four species, all from China.
