= Pasias =

Scientific classification
- Kingdom: Animalia
- Phylum: Arthropoda
- Subphylum: Chelicerata
- Class: Arachnida
- Order: Araneae
- Infraorder: Araneomorphae
- Family: Thomisidae
- Genus: Pasias; Simon

Type species
- Pasias luzonus

Species
- Pasias luzonus Simon, 1895; Pasias marathas Tikader, 1965; Pasias puspagiri Tikader, 1963

Genus of spiders

Pasias is a genus of spiders in the family Thomisidae. It was first described in 1895 by Simon. As of 2017, it contains 3 species found in the Philippines and India.
