= Titidius =

Scientific classification
- Kingdom: Animalia
- Phylum: Arthropoda
- Subphylum: Chelicerata
- Class: Arachnida
- Order: Araneae
- Infraorder: Araneomorphae
- Family: Thomisidae
- Genus: Titidius; Simon

Type species
- Titidius rubrosignatus

Species
- 20, see text

Genus of spiders

Titidius is a genus of spiders in the family Thomisidae. It was first described in 1895 by Eugène Simon. As of 2017, it contains 20 species.

== Species ==
Titidius comprises the following species:

- Titidius albifrons Mello-Leitão, 1929 – Brazil
- Titidius albiscriptus Mello-Leitão, 1941 – Brazil
- Titidius caninde Esmerio & Lise, 1996 – Brazil
- Titidius curvilineatus Mello-Leitão, 1941 – Brazil
- Titidius difficilis Mello-Leitão, 1929 – Brazil
- Titidius dubitatus Soares & Soares, 1946 – Brazil
- Titidius dubius Mello-Leitão, 1929 – Brazil
- Titidius galbanatus (Keyserling, 1880) – Colombia, Brazil
- Titidius gurupi Esmerio & Lise, 1996 – Brazil
- Titidius haemorrhous Mello-Leitão, 1947 – Brazil
- Titidius ignestii Caporiacco, 1947 – Guyana
- Titidius longicaudatus Mello-Leitão, 1943 – Brazil
- Titidius marmoratus Mello-Leitão, 1929 – Brazil
- Titidius multifasciatus Mello-Leitão, 1929 – Brazil
- Titidius pauper Mello-Leitão, 1947 – Brazil, Argentina
- Titidius quinquenotatus Mello-Leitão, 1929 – Bolivia, Brazil, Suriname
- Titidius rubescens Caporiacco, 1947 – Venezuela, Brazil, Guiana, Suriname
- Titidius rubrosignatus (Keyserling, 1880) – Brazil
- Titidius uncatus Mello-Leitão, 1929 – Brazil
- Titidius urucu Esmerio & Lise, 1996 – Brazil
