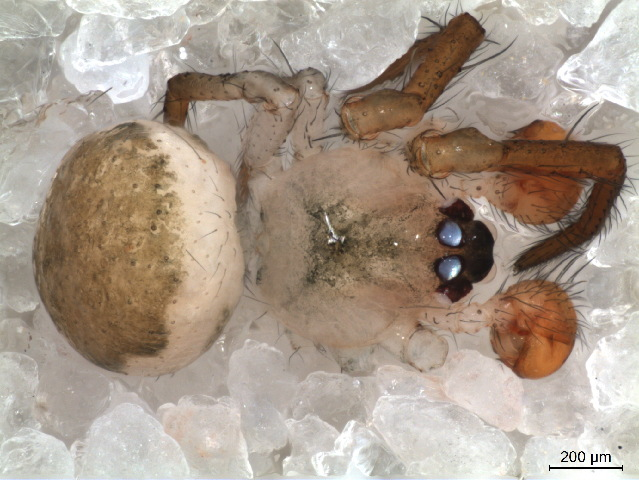
- O. pentagonus

Scientific classification
- Kingdom: Animalia
- Phylum: Arthropoda
- Subphylum: Chelicerata
- Class: Arachnida
- Order: Araneae
- Infraorder: Araneomorphae
- Family: Thomisidae
- Genus: Onocolus; Simon

Type species
- Onocolus echinatus

Species
- 17, see text

Synonyms
- Paronocolus

= Onocolus =

Genus of spiders

Onocolus is a genus of South American crab spiders first described by Eugène Simon in 1895. It is considered a senior synonym of Paronocolus.

== Species ==
As of October 2022, it contains seventeen species: Onocolus comprises the following species:

- Onocolus ankeri (Teixeira & Machado, 2019) — Colombia, Brazil
- Onocolus biocellatus Mello-Leitão, 1948 — Guyana
- Onocolus compactilis Simon, 1895 — Peru, Brazil
- Onocolus echinatus (Taczanowski, 1872) — Venezuela to Brazil
- Onocolus echinicaudus Mello-Leitão, 1929 — Brazil, Paraguay
- Onocolus echinurus Mello-Leitão, 1929 — Brazil
- Onocolus eloaeus Lise, 1980 — Brazil
- Onocolus garruchus Lise, 1979 — Brazil
- Onocolus granulosus Mello-Leitão, 1929 — Peru, Brazil
- Onocolus infelix Mello-Leitão, 1941 — Brazil
- Onocolus intermedius (Mello-Leitão, 1929) — Brazil, Paraguay
- Onocolus latiductus Lise, 1980 — South America
- Onocolus mitralis Lise, 1979 — Venezuela, Brazil
- Onocolus pentagonus (Keyserling, 1880) — Panama to Brazil
- Onocolus perditus Mello-Leitão, 1929 — Brazil
- Onocolus simoni Mello-Leitão, 1915 — Brazil, Peru
- Onocolus trifolius Mello-Leitão, 1929 — Brazil
