= Indosmodicinus =

Scientific classification
- Kingdom: Animalia
- Phylum: Arthropoda
- Subphylum: Chelicerata
- Class: Arachnida
- Order: Araneae
- Infraorder: Araneomorphae
- Family: Thomisidae
- Genus: Indosmodicinus; Sen, Saha & Raychaudhuri, 2010
- Species: I. bengalensis

Binomial name
- Indosmodicinus bengalensis Sen, Saha & Raychaudhuri, 2010

Monotypic genus of spiders

Indosmodicinus is a monotypic genus of Asian crab spiders containing the single species, Indosmodicinus bengalensis. It was first described by S. Sen, S. Saha & D. Raychaudhuri in 2010, and is found in China and India.

== See also ==
- List of Thomisidae species
