= Ibana =

Scientific classification
- Kingdom: Animalia
- Phylum: Arthropoda
- Subphylum: Chelicerata
- Class: Arachnida
- Order: Araneae
- Infraorder: Araneomorphae
- Family: Thomisidae
- Genus: Ibana; Benjamin, 2014

Type species
- Ibana senagang Simon, 1886

Species
- 2, see text

Genus of spiders

Ibana is a genus of spiders in the family Thomisidae. It was first described in 2014. As of 2022, it contains only two species, Ibana gan, found in China and Ibana senagang, found in Borneo.

== Species ==
As of November 2022 it contains two species, found in Asia:

- Ibana gan (Liu & S. Q. Li, 2022) – China
- Ibana senagang (Benjamin, 2014) – Borneo
