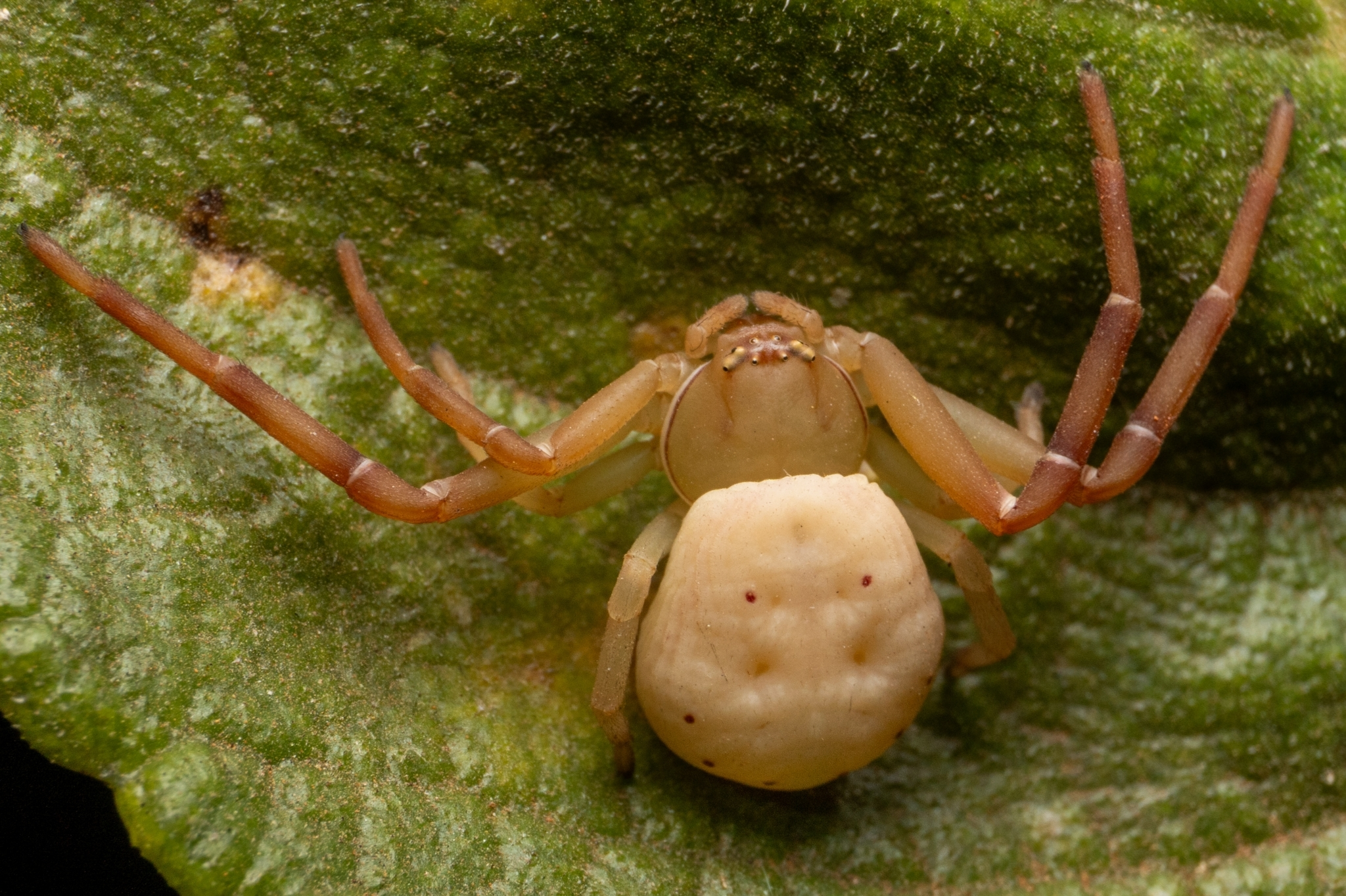

Scientific classification
- Kingdom: Animalia
- Phylum: Arthropoda
- Subphylum: Chelicerata
- Class: Arachnida
- Order: Araneae
- Infraorder: Araneomorphae
- Family: Thomisidae
- Genus: Philogaeus; Simon

Type species
- Philogaeus campestratus

Species
- Philogaeus campestratus Simon, 1895; Philogaeus echimys Mello-Leitão, 1943

= Philogaeus =

Genus of spiders

Philogaeus is a genus of spiders in the family Thomisidae. It was first described in 1895 by Simon. As of 2017, it contains 2 species, found in Brazil and Chile.
