= Sinothomisus =

Scientific classification
- Domain: Eukaryota
- Kingdom: Animalia
- Phylum: Arthropoda
- Subphylum: Chelicerata
- Class: Arachnida
- Order: Araneae
- Infraorder: Araneomorphae
- Family: Thomisidae
- Genus: Sinothomisus; Peng

Type species
- Sinothomisus liae

Species
- Sinothomisus hainanus (Song, 1994) – China (Hainan); Sinothomisus liae Tang, Yin, Griswold & Peng, 2006 – China

Genus of spiders

Sinothomisus is a genus of spiders in the family Thomisidae. It was first described in 2006 by Tang, Yin, Griswold & Peng. As of 2017, it contains 2 Chinese species.
