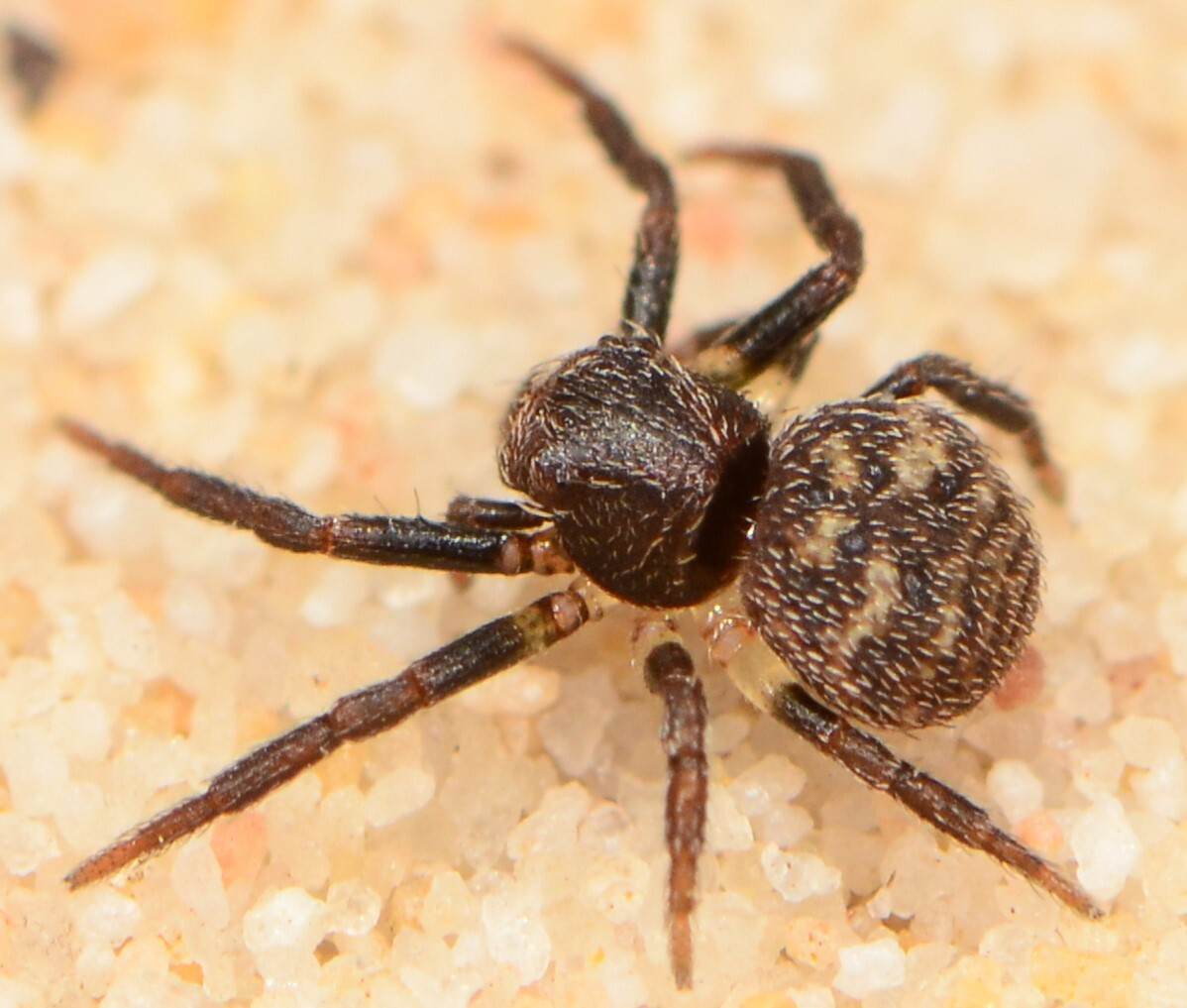
- female
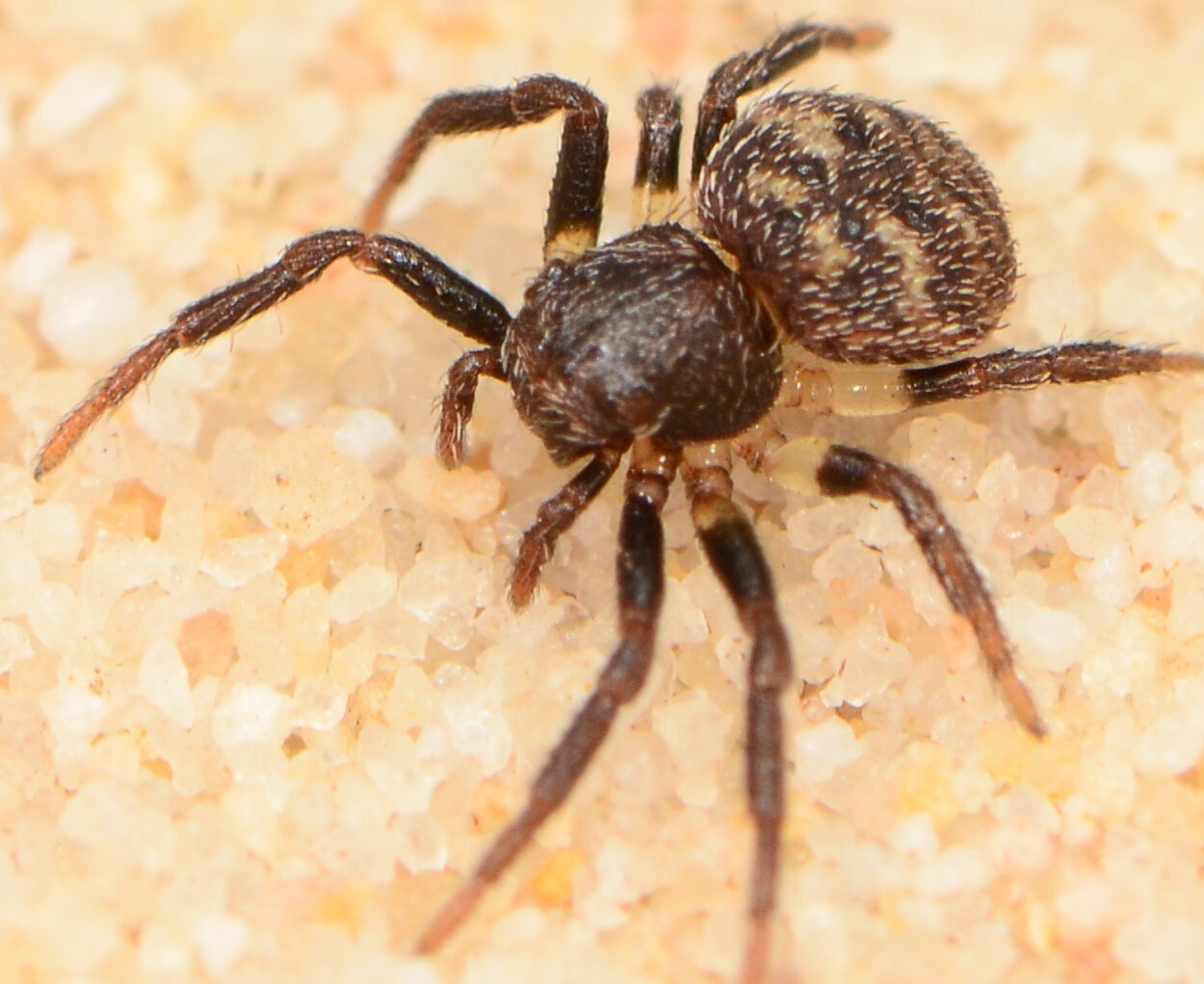
- female

Scientific classification
- Kingdom: Animalia
- Phylum: Arthropoda
- Subphylum: Chelicerata
- Class: Arachnida
- Order: Araneae
- Infraorder: Araneomorphae
- Family: Thomisidae
- Genus: Avelis; Simon, 1895
- Species: A. hystriculus

Binomial name
- Avelis hystriculus Simon, 1895

= Avelis =

Monotypic genus of crab spiders

Avelis is a monotypic genus of African crab spiders containing the single species, Avelis hystriculus. It was first described by Eugène Simon in 1895, and is endemic to South Africa.

== Distribution ==
Avelis hystriculus has a wide distribution across South Africa, having been recorded from the provinces Eastern Cape, KwaZulu-Natal, Limpopo, North West, and Western Cape.

Notable localities include East London, Sodwana Bay, Polokwane, the Magaliesberg, Bellville, Oudtshoorn, and Robben Island. The species has been recorded from more than ten protected areas, including Mkambathi Nature Reserve, De Hoop Nature Reserve, Tembe Elephant Park, and Ndumo Game Reserve.

== Habitat ==
Avelis hystriculus are free-living plant dwellers that are frequently found on low-growing vegetation. They have been sampled in various South African biomes, including Fynbos, Grassland, Indian Ocean Coastal Belt, Thicket, and Savanna at elevations ranging from 1 to 1,310 m above sea level.

== Description ==
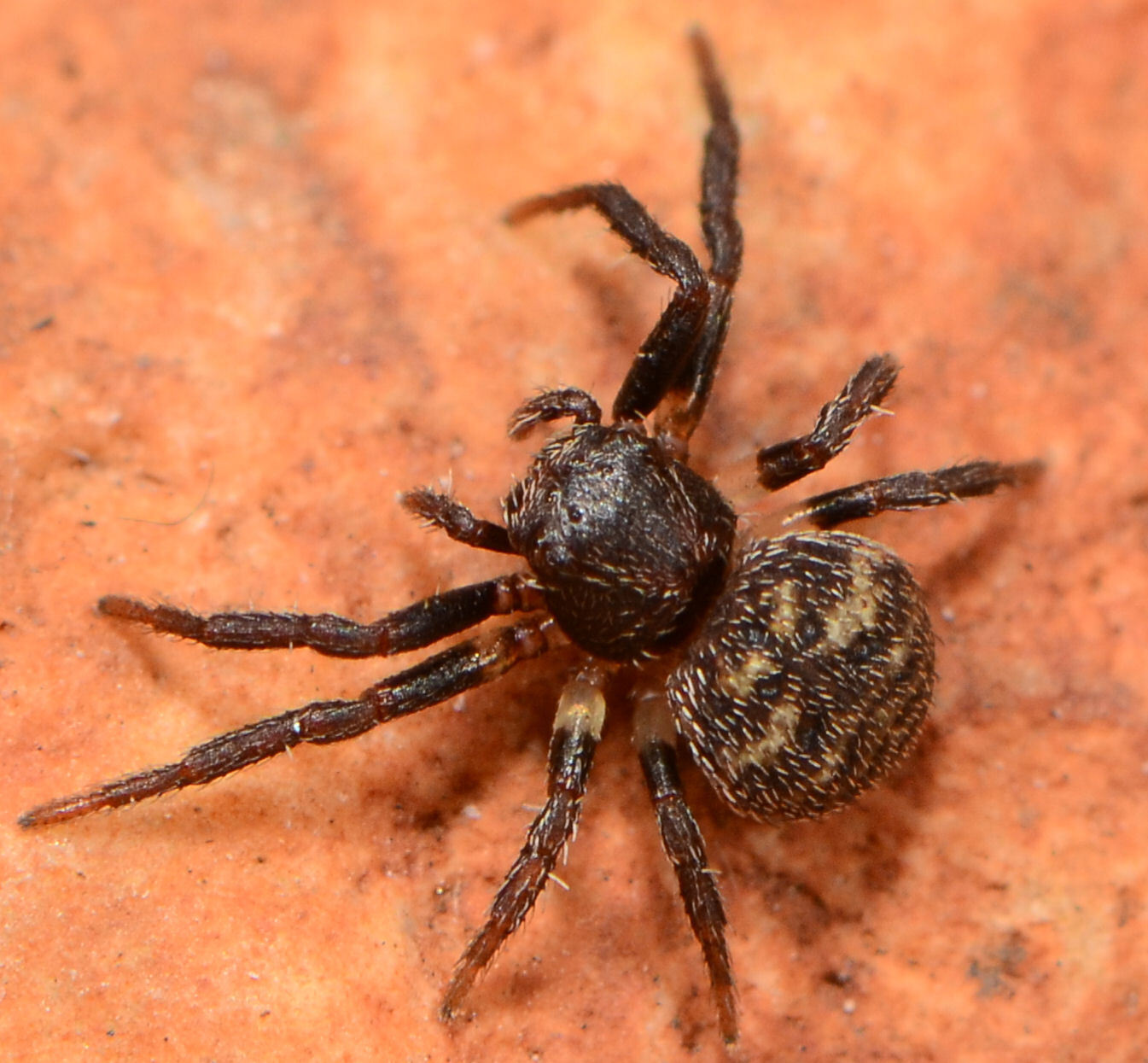
female

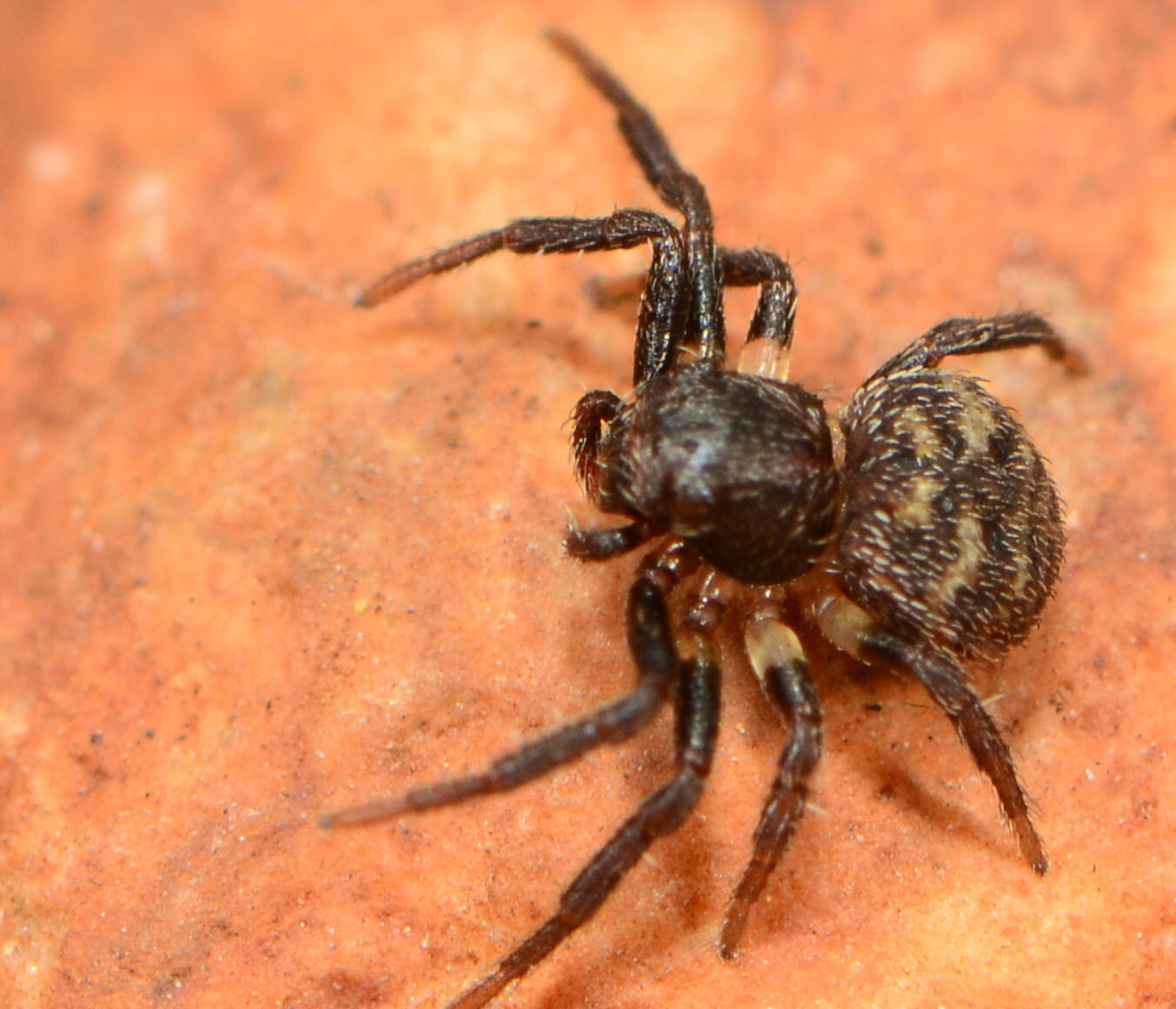
female

Both females and males are less than 3 mm in total length. The colour is tawny to reddish brown to dark brown with a grey-white to dark grey abdomen, and legs are reddish brown to dark brown. The carapace is as wide as long with rounded sides, convex, clothed with numerous white setae which lie close to the body surface with longer setae scattered in between, and a row of setae on edge of posterior declivity.

The abdomen is as wide as long and clothed with long, dark club-shaped setae. The legs are short with no great difference between leg lengths, clothed with the same type of setae as on body, and the patellae are longer than the metatarsi.

Males are very similar to females but a little darker in colour. Avelis resembles the genera Holopelus and Thomisops in the shape of the body and legs. However, Avelis differs from both in lacking a densely spinulose area on the promargin of the chelicerae.

== Taxonomy ==
The genus Avelis was established by Simon in 1895 based on the type species A. hystriculus.

The genus was revised by Dippenaar-Schoeman in 1986, who provided detailed morphological descriptions.

== Conservation status ==
Avelis hystriculus is classified as Least Concern in South African conservation assessments due to its wide geographical range and presence in numerous protected areas. Despite being described by Simon in 1895 as a very common species in the Cape Province, only a limited number of specimens have been collected since then, though this may reflect collection effort rather than actual rarity.
