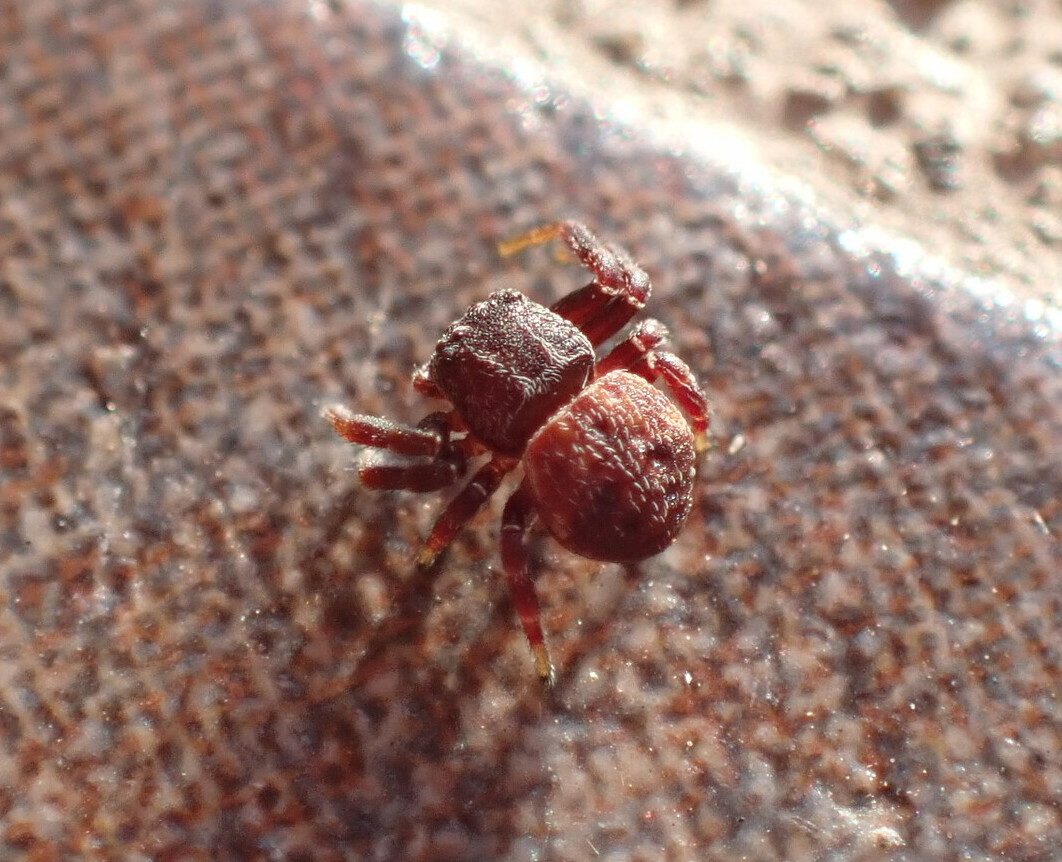

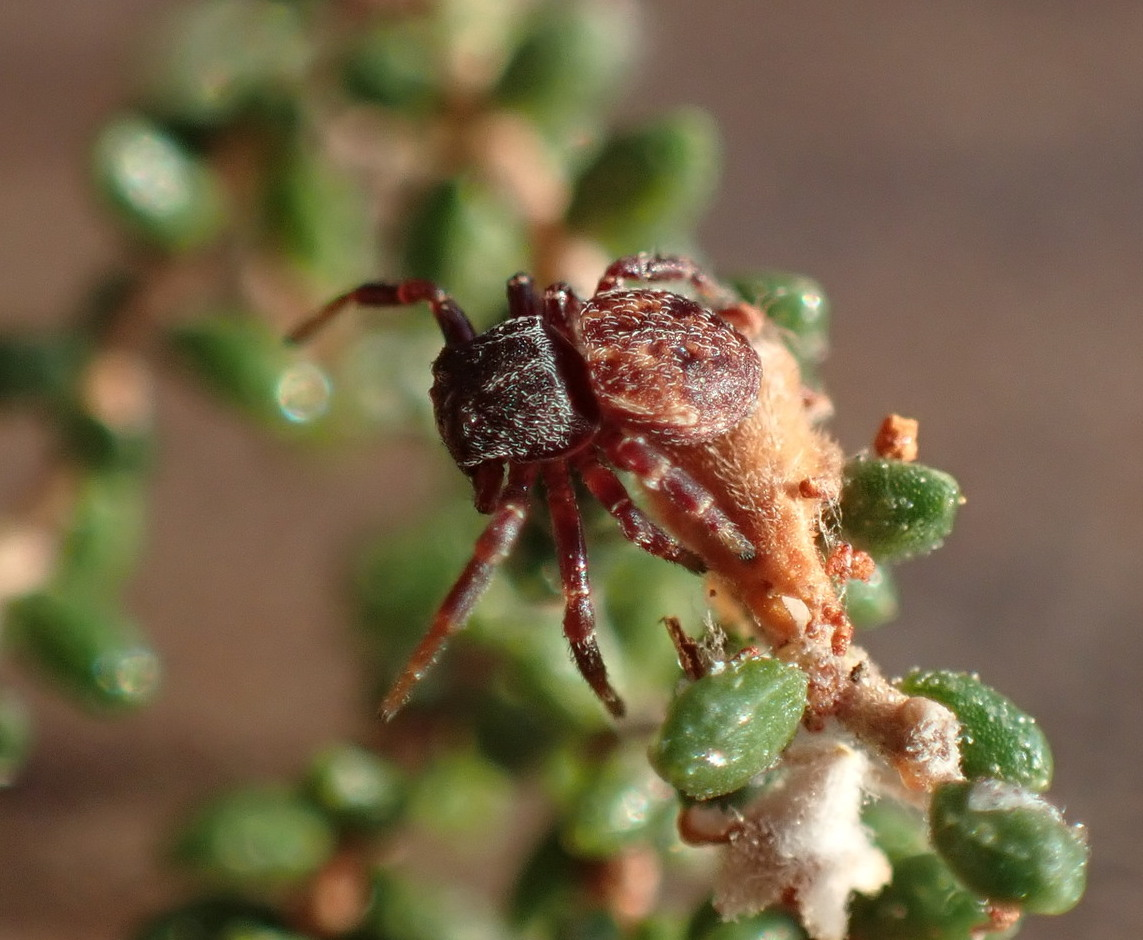

Scientific classification
- Kingdom: Animalia
- Phylum: Arthropoda
- Subphylum: Chelicerata
- Class: Arachnida
- Order: Araneae
- Infraorder: Araneomorphae
- Family: Thomisidae
- Genus: Holopelus
- Species: H. almiae

Binomial name
- Holopelus almiae Dippenaar-Schoeman, 1986

= Holopelus almiae =

Almi's Crab Spider

Species of spider

Holopelus almiae is a species of spider in the family Thomisidae. It is endemic to South Africa, where it is known from several localities in the Eastern Cape and Western Cape. It is commonly known as Almi's crab spider.

== Habitat and ecology ==
Holopelus almiae lives mainly on grass and low shrubs at altitudes ranging from 4 to 1002 m. It has been sampled from the Thicket and Fynbos biomes.

== Description ==
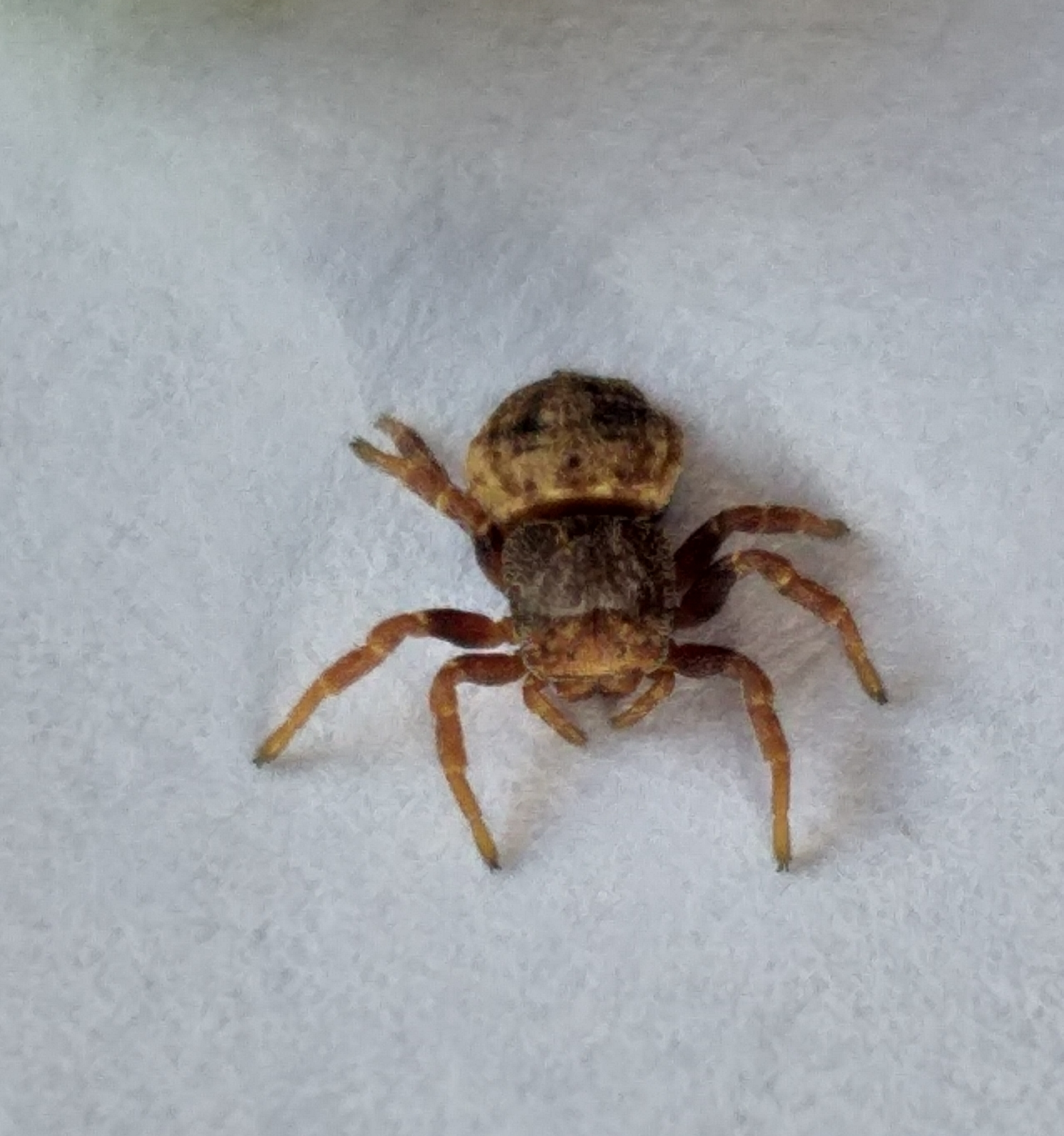

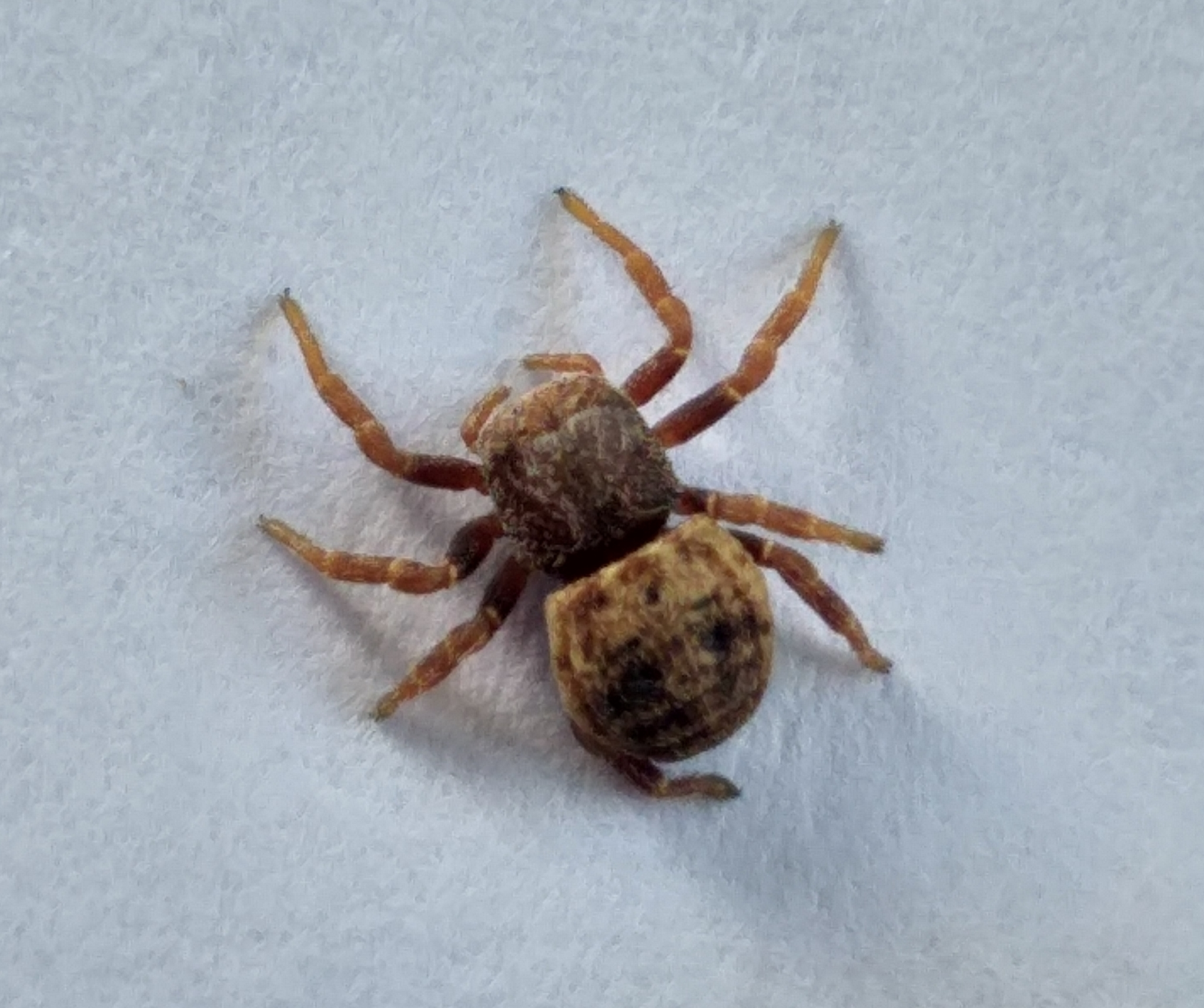

== Conservation ==
Holopelus almiae is protected in several reserves including Baviaanskloof Nature Reserve, De Hoop Nature Reserve, Fernkloof Nature Reserve, Swartberg Nature Reserve, Addo Elephant National Park and Table Mountain National Park. Due to its large range, the species is listed as Least Concern by the South African National Biodiversity Institute.

== Etymology ==
The species is named after Almi van den Berg, a former technician at the Plant Protection Research Institute in Pretoria.

== Taxonomy ==
Holopelus almiae was described in 1986 from Hermanus in the Western Cape by Dippenaar-Schoeman.
