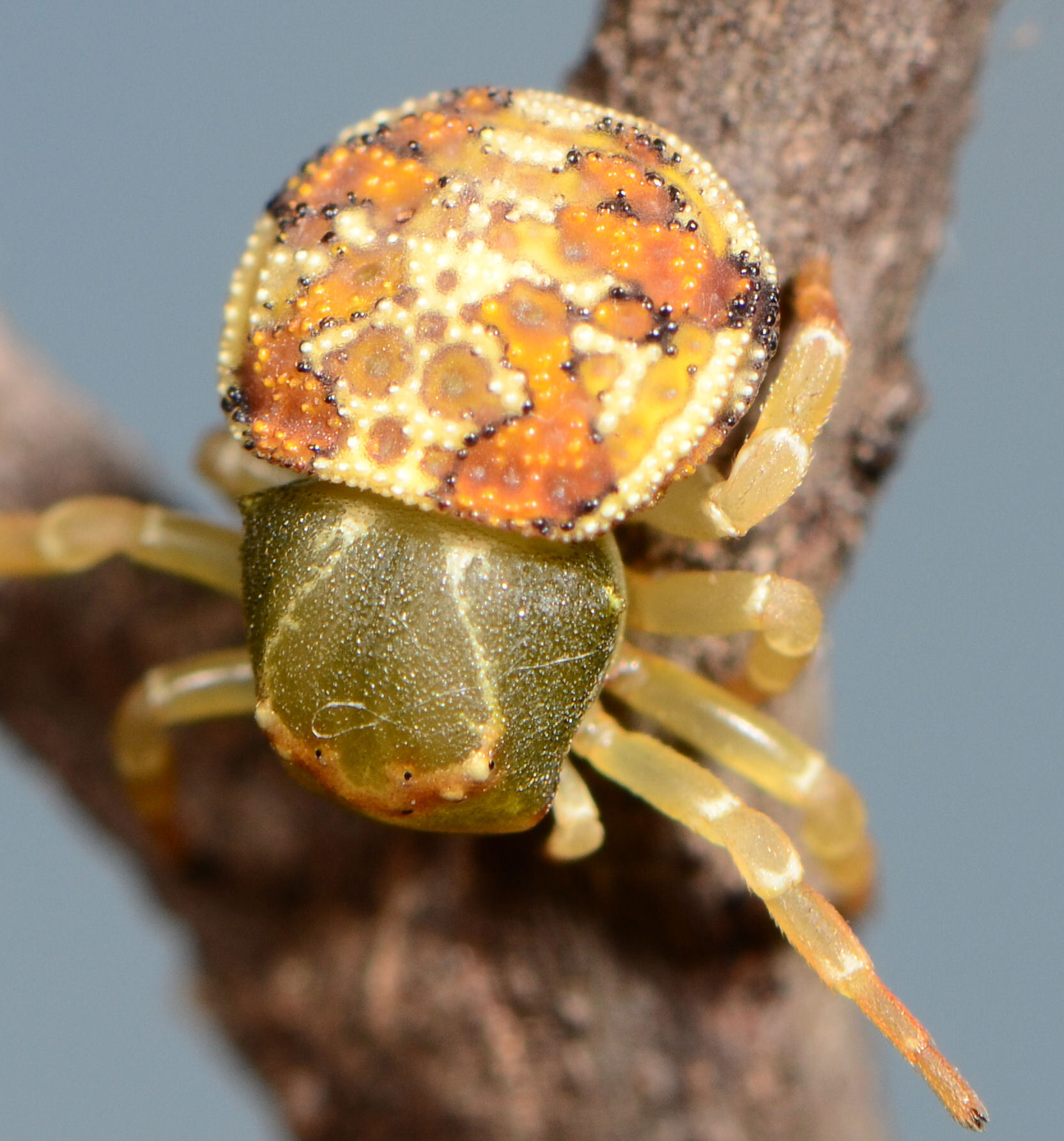
- female
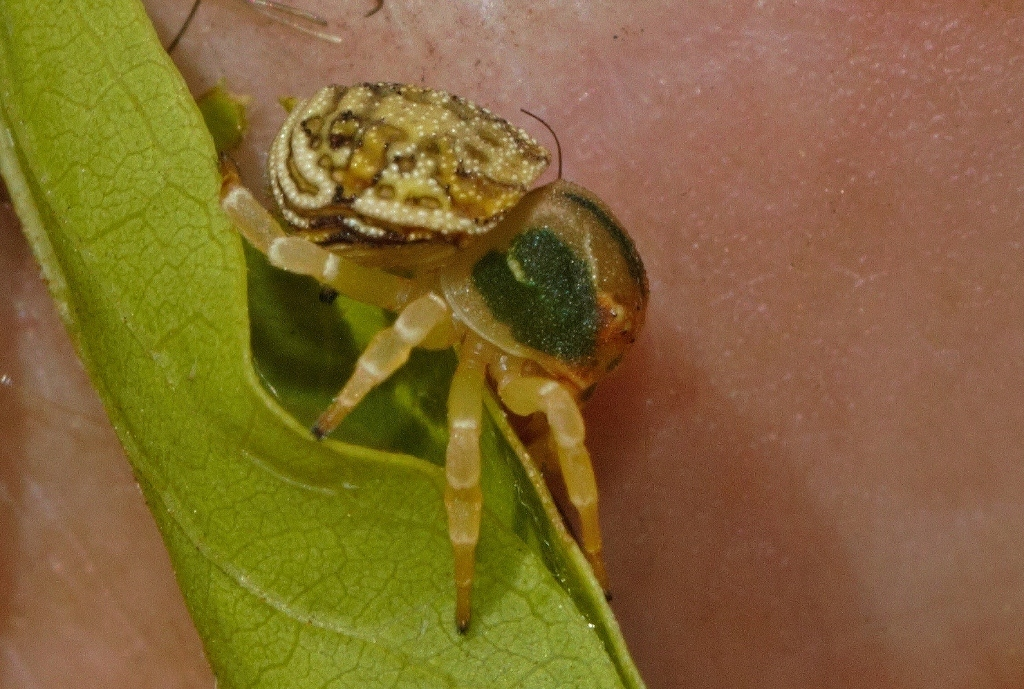
- T. pupa from Zimbabwe

Scientific classification
- Kingdom: Animalia
- Phylum: Arthropoda
- Subphylum: Chelicerata
- Class: Arachnida
- Order: Araneae
- Infraorder: Araneomorphae
- Family: Thomisidae
- Genus: Thomisops
- Species: T. pupa

Binomial name
- Thomisops pupa Karsch, 1879

Synonyms
- Thomisops pusio Karsch, 1879; Thomisus vastus Bösenberg & Lenz, 1894

= Thomisops pupa =

Decorated Thomisops crab spider

Species of crab spider

Thomisops pupa is a species of crab spider in the family Thomisidae. It is widespread from South Africa to Ethiopia and is commonly known as the decorated Thomisops crab spider.

The species name pupa is derived from Latin, meaning "doll" or "puppet".

== Taxonomy ==
Thomisops pupa was first described by Ferdinand Karsch in 1879 from specimens collected in Zanzibar. The species was subsequently found to be synonymous with two other species: Thomisops pusio Karsch, 1879 and Thomisus vastus Bösenberg & Lenz, 1894, with the synonymy established by Roger de Lessert in 1933.

== Distribution ==
Thomisops pupa has been recorded from numerous African countries, including Tanzania (including Zanzibar), Senegal, Cameroon, Zaire, Ethiopia, Mozambique, South Africa, Zimbabwe, Namibia, Kenya, and Angola.

In South Africa, the species is known from Eastern Cape, Gauteng, KwaZulu-Natal, Limpopo, and Mpumalanga provinces.

== Habitat ==
Thomisops pupa is a free-living species found on plants and flowers. The spiders are frequently collected with sweep nets from herbs, grasses, and flowery shrubs, and are usually found in large numbers on flowers. In South Africa, the species has been sampled from Forest, Grassland, Indian Ocean Belt, Savanna, and Thicket biomes at elevations ranging from 4 to 1,435 metres above sea level.

== Description ==
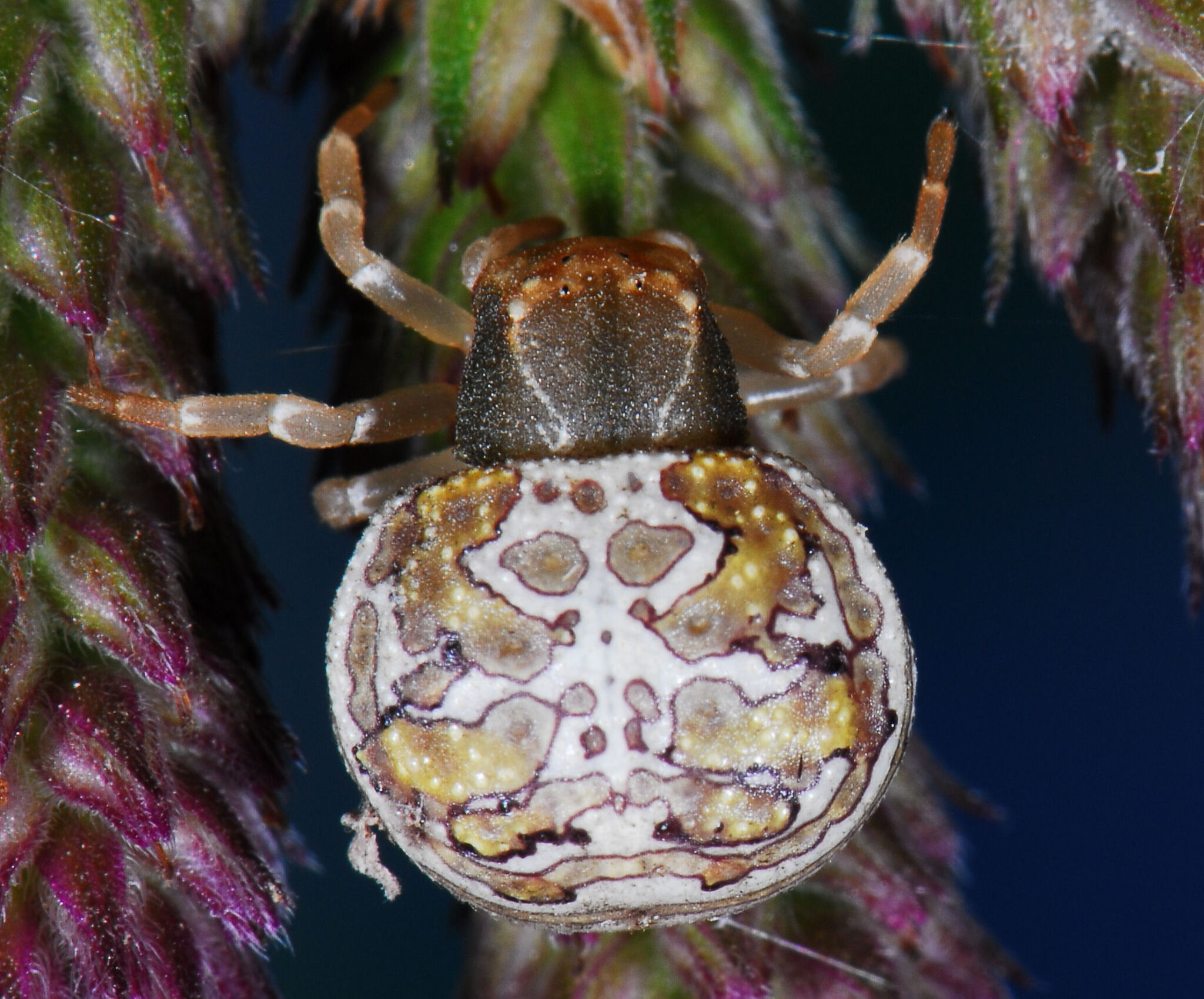
female

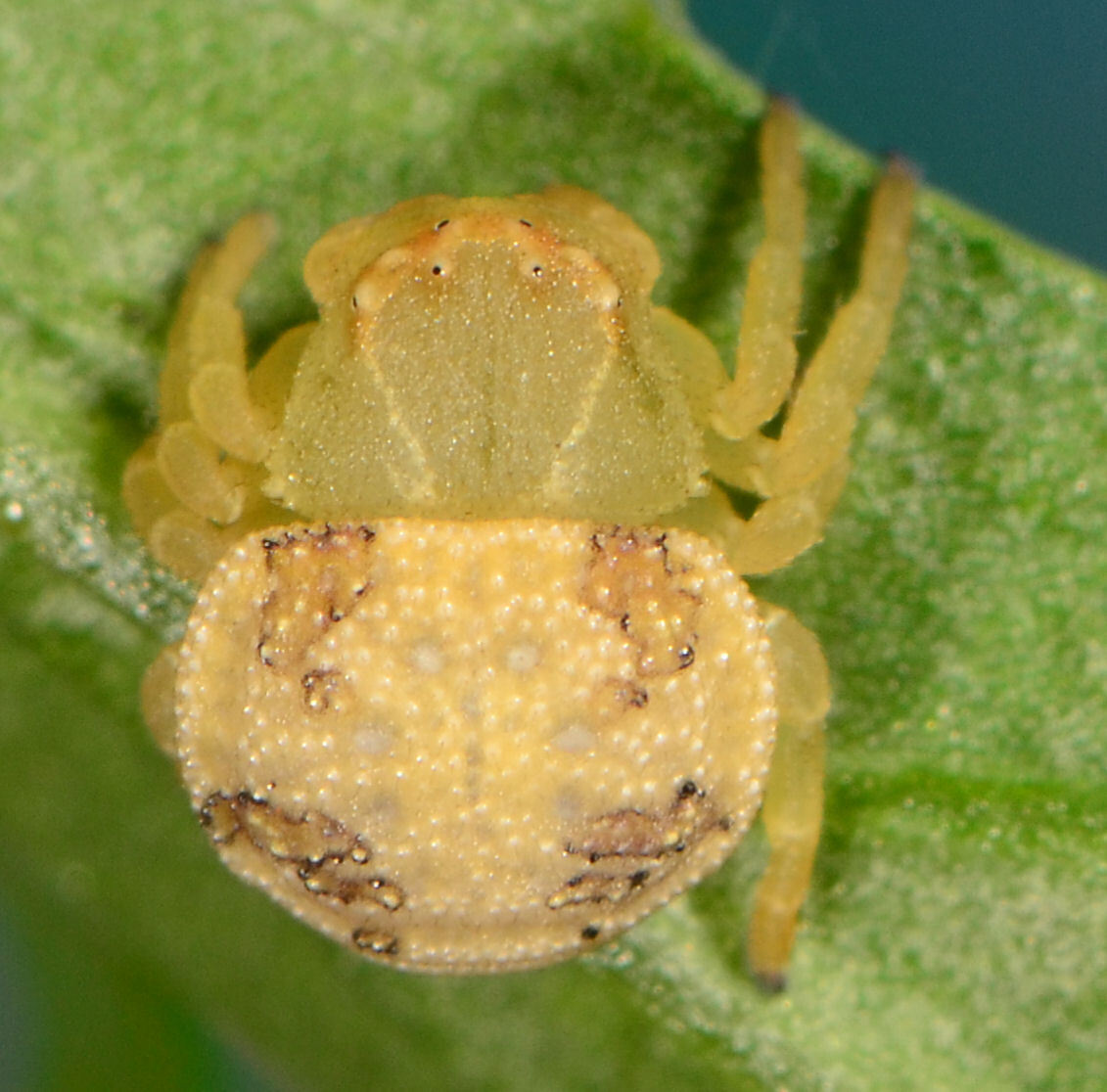
female

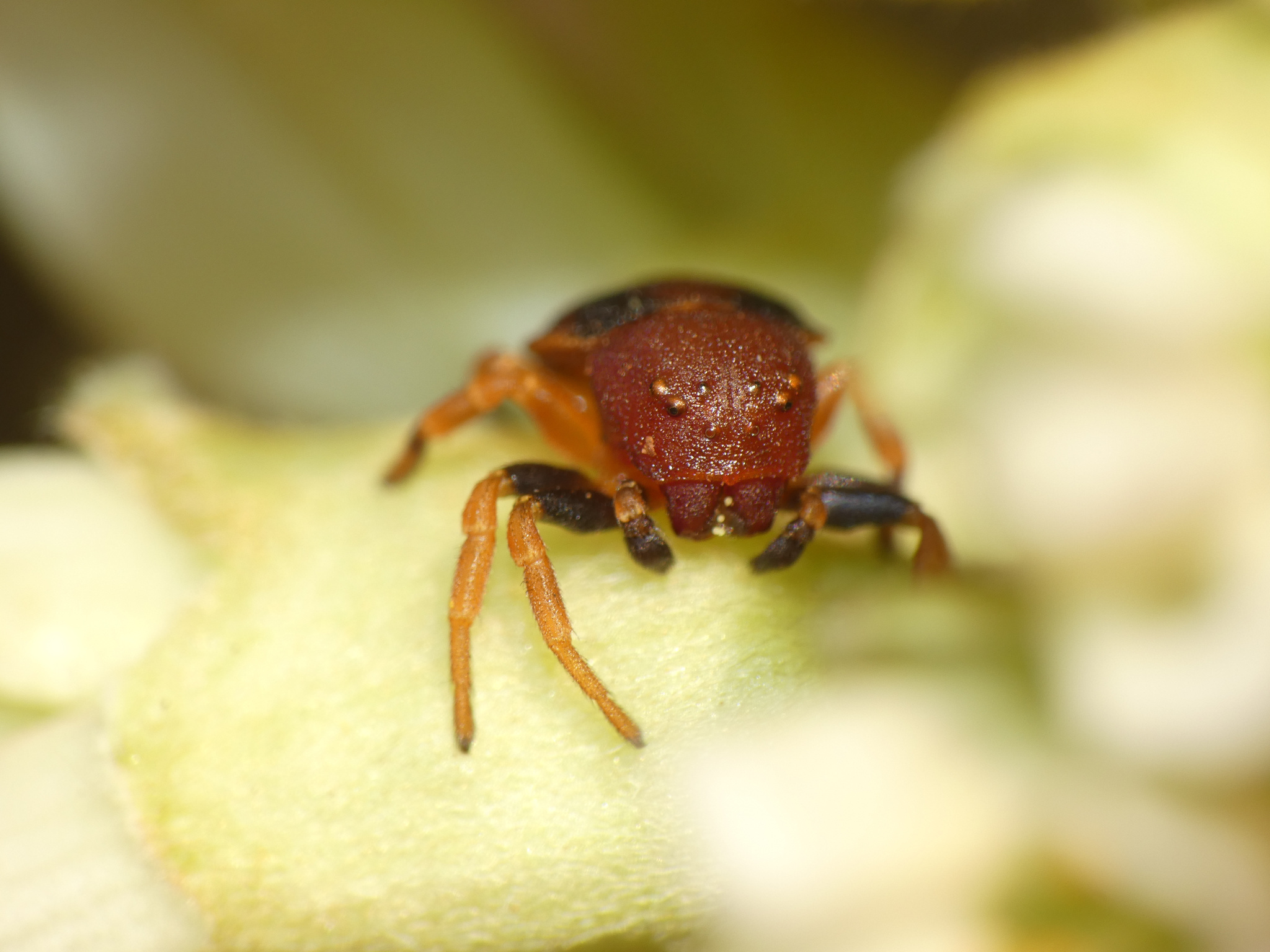
T. pupa from Zimbabwe

Thomisops pupa is among the largest species in the genus Thomisops, with females being considerably larger than males.

=== Females ===
Females have a total length of 6-7 mm. The carapace is fawn to yellowish brown, sometimes darker around the edges, with the eye area suffused with white and thin white irregular lines stretching from the posterior lateral eyes to the posterior edge. The chelicerae are fawn, centrally suffused with white.

The opisthosoma is ivory to fawn with irregular greyish brown patterns that usually have very distinct black margins. These concentric figures are circular and sometimes linked at the posterior end to form a more transversal band. In approximately 10% of specimens examined, these patterns are faint or even absent. The colour of the abdomen varies considerably, from white to white with very distinct patterns.

The legs are yellow with thin white lines on each leg segment, with the tarsi of all legs being slightly darker. The sternum and abdomen are ventrally pale. The carapace is cubical and slopes slightly towards the front, being 1.4 times wider posteriorly than anteriorly, with distinct posterolateral corners. The opisthosoma is wider than long, truncated anteriorly and rounded posteriorly.

=== Males ===
Males are considerably smaller, with a total length of 3.5-3.8 mm. The carapace is brown, paler around the eyes, while the abdomen is yellowish brown dorsally with a shield-like appearance. Markings on the abdomen are similar to females but may be distinct or faint. The legs are yellow, with femora I and II, and metatarsi and tarsi III and IV being dark brown.

=== Juveniles ===
Juveniles are very similar to adult females in both shape and color.

== Ecology ==
Adults are collected from October to March in South Africa. The species exhibits typical crab spider behaviour, ambushing prey on flowers and vegetation rather than constructing webs.

== Conservation status ==
Thomisops pupa is listed as Least Concern on the South African Red List due to its wide geographical range throughout Africa and stable populations. The species has been recorded from several protected areas, including Kruger National Park, Ndumo Game Reserve, and various other nature reserves across South Africa.
