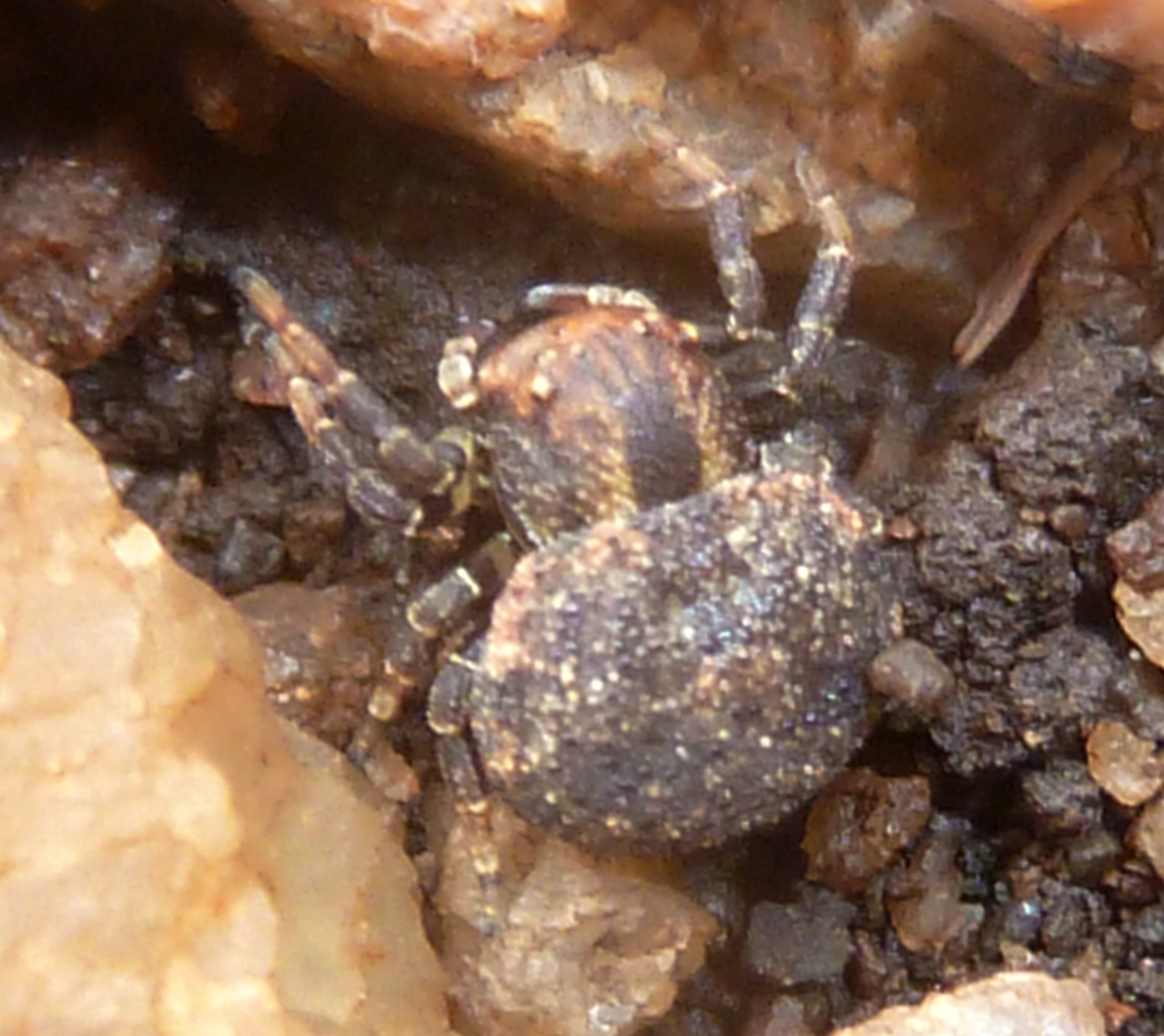
- T. sulcatus from South Africa
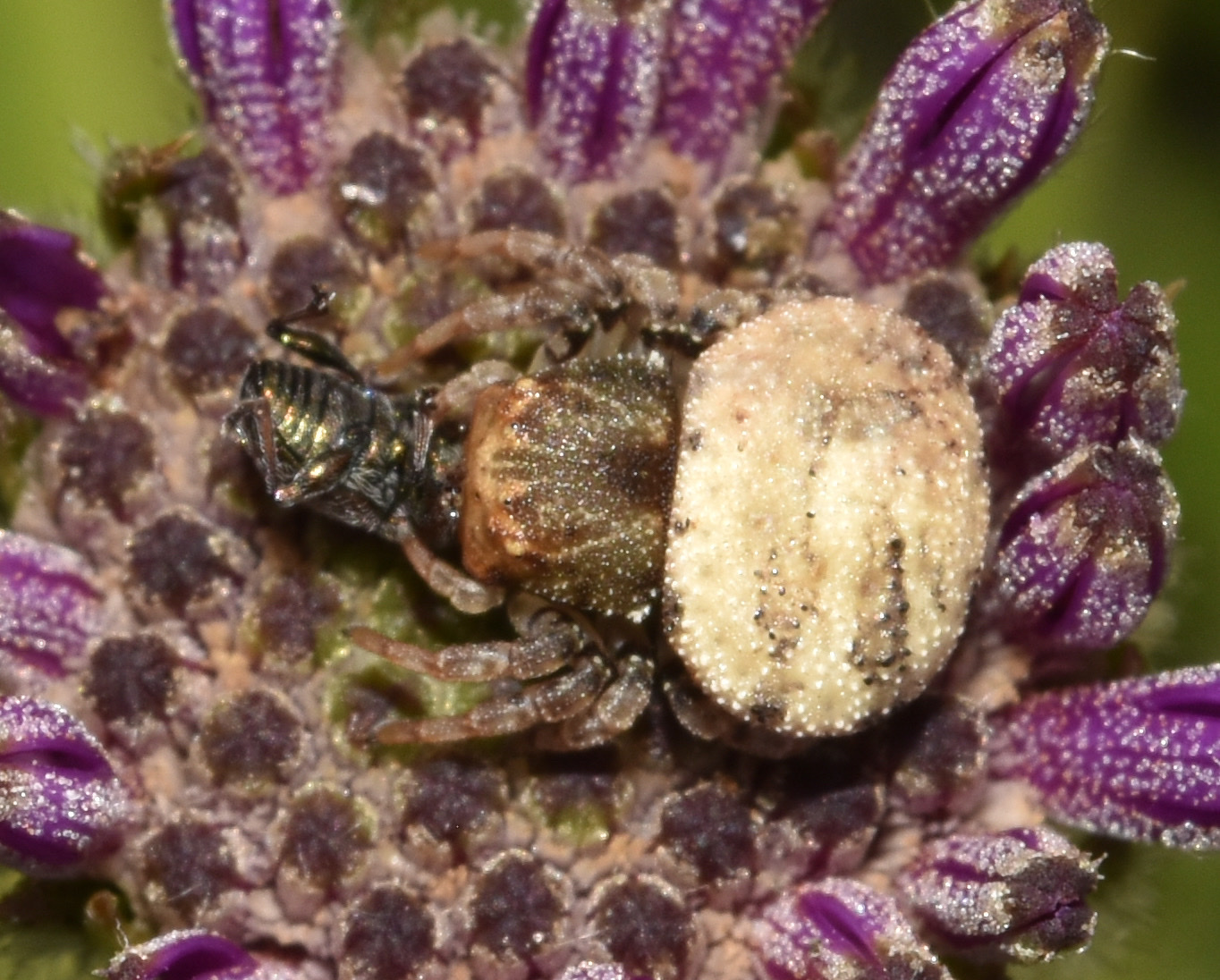
- female with prey

Conservation status
- Least Concern (IUCN 3.1)

Scientific classification
- Kingdom: Animalia
- Phylum: Arthropoda
- Subphylum: Chelicerata
- Class: Arachnida
- Order: Araneae
- Infraorder: Araneomorphae
- Family: Thomisidae
- Genus: Thomisops
- Species: T. sulcatus

Binomial name
- Thomisops sulcatus Simon, 1895

Synonyms
- Thomisops nigroannulatus Lawrence, 1942

= Thomisops sulcatus =

White banded legs Thomisops crab spider

Species of spider

Thomisops sulcatus is a species of crab spider in the family Thomisidae. It is widely distributed across Africa, where it is commonly known as the white banded legs Thomisops crab spider.

== Taxonomy ==
The species was first described by Eugène Simon in 1895 based on a female specimen from Makapan in the Transvaal. Lawrence (1942) described Thomisops nigroannulatus from Natal based on two females, but this was later found to be conspecific with T. sulcatus and was synonymized by Dippenaar-Schoeman in 1989.

== Distribution ==
Thomisops sulcatus has a wide distribution throughout Africa, including South Africa, Namibia, Cameroon, Zimbabwe, Ghana, Liberia, Angola, Tanzania, Zaire, and Mozambique.

In South Africa, the species has been recorded from seven provinces: Eastern Cape, Free State, KwaZulu-Natal, Limpopo, Mpumalanga, Northern Cape, and Western Cape. It occurs across various biomes including Forest, Grassland, Indian Ocean Coastal Belt, Savanna and Thicket biomes, at altitudes ranging from 15 to 1842 metres above sea level.

== Habitat ==
Thomisops sulcatus is free-living on plants and is occasionally found in low vegetation. The species has been collected using sweepnets and pitfall traps, with specimens found in grass at the base of walls where ants and termites were abundant, suggesting they may feed on these insects or be associated with them. Both males and females are collected throughout the year, with females recorded in January, February, June, August and November, and males in April, May and October.

== Description ==
The species is recognized by its dark coloration, the shape of the carapace (which does not slope anteriorly), and the distinctive banded legs in both sexes.

Female body length ranges from 3.5-5.8 mm.

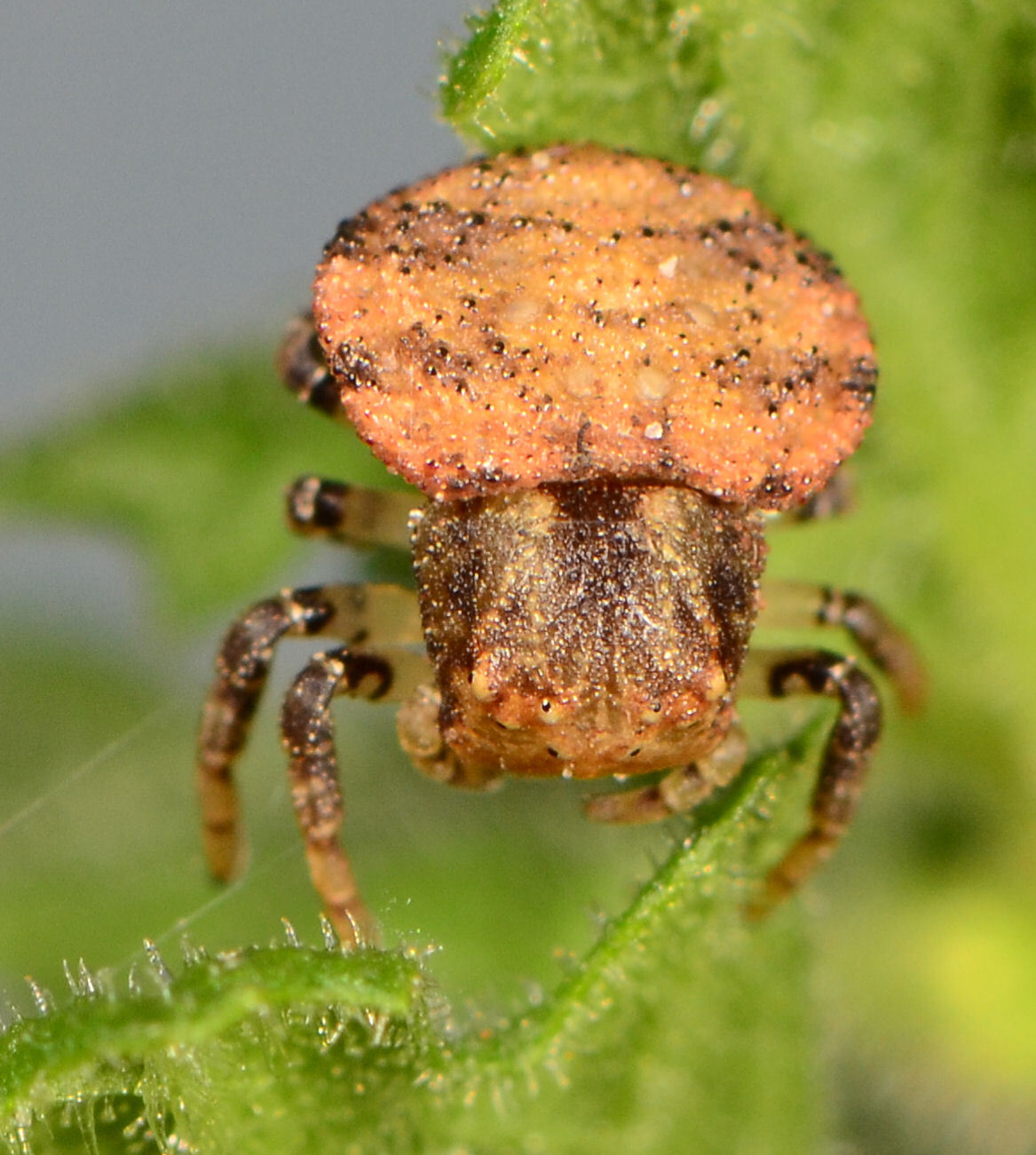
female

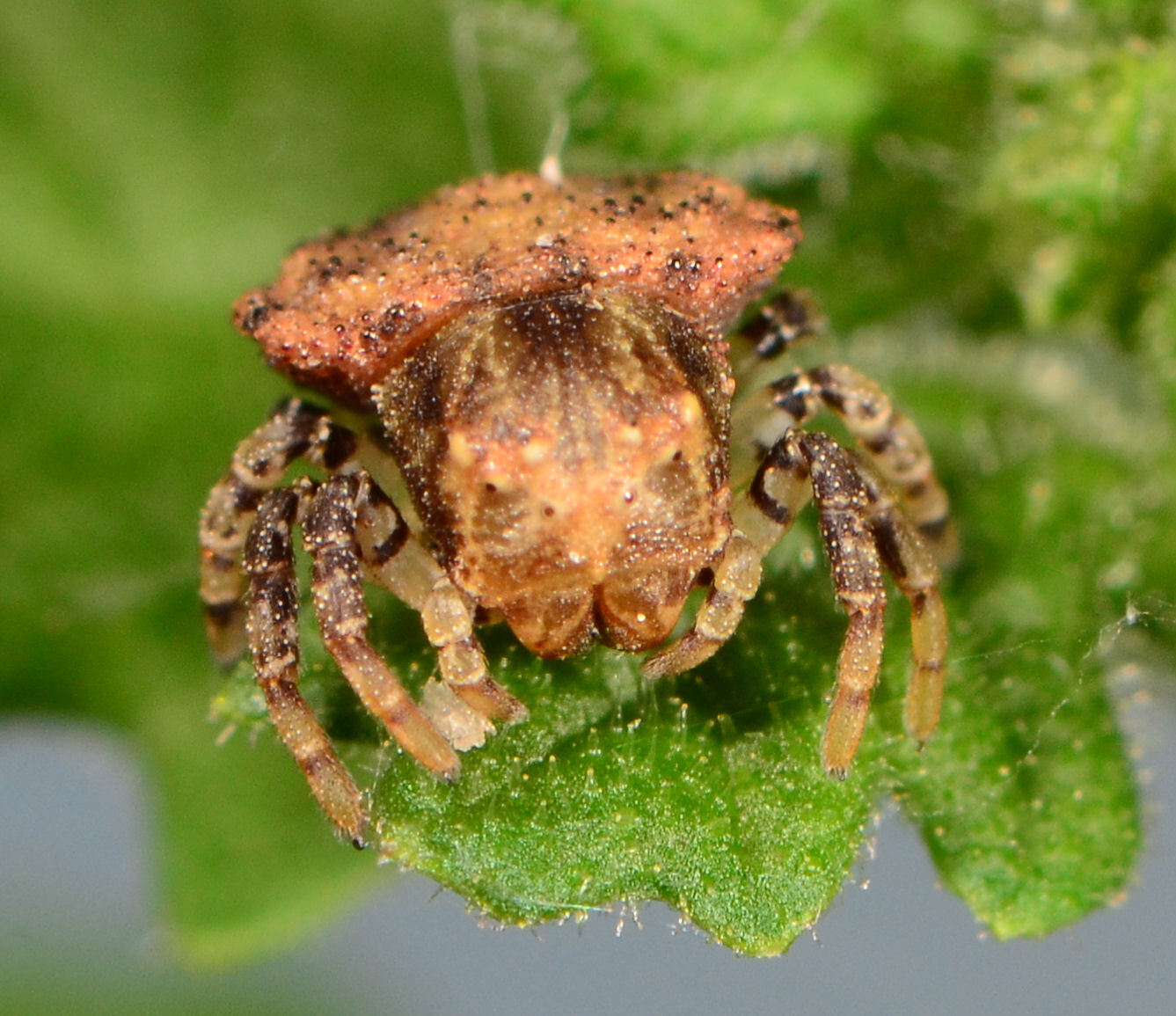

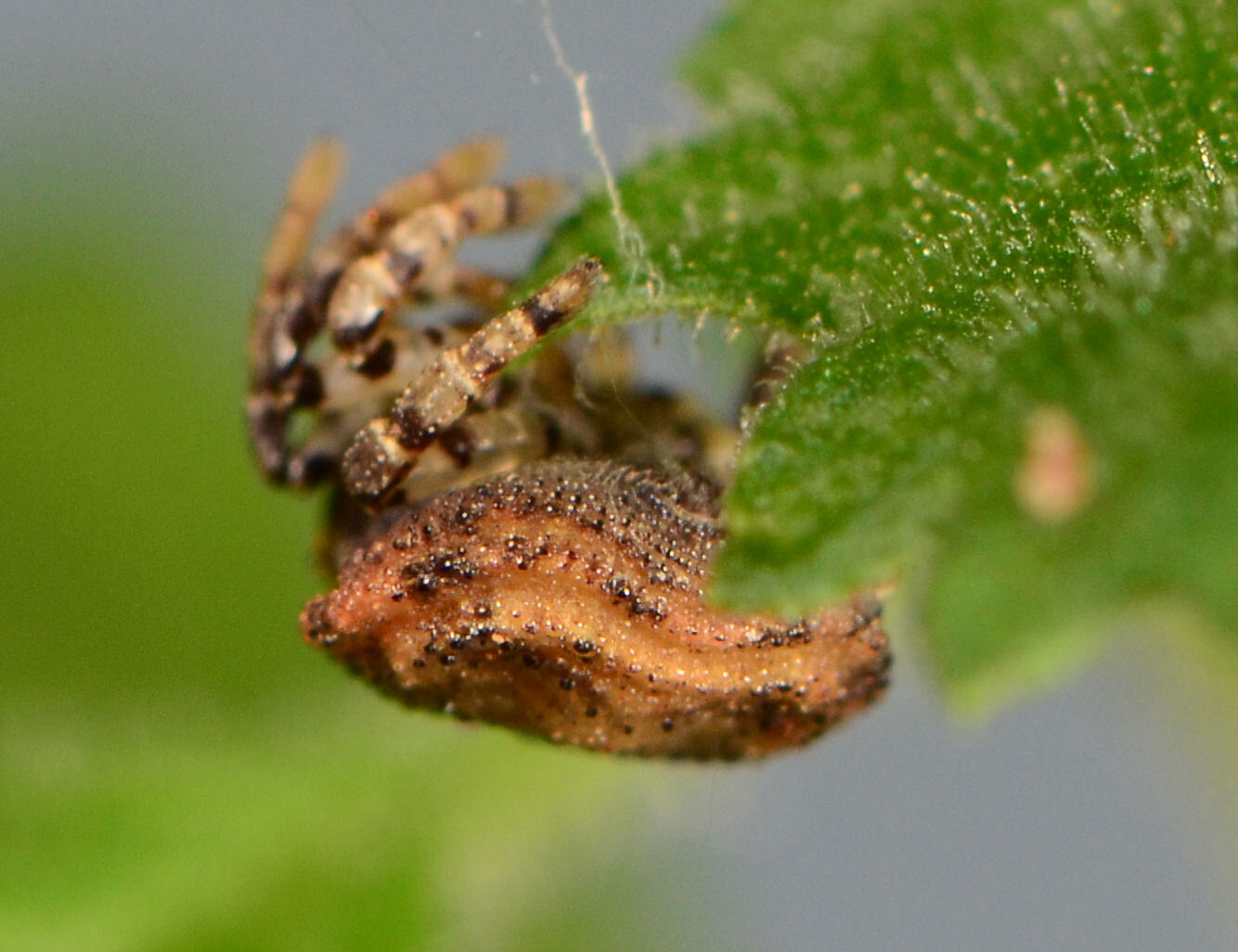

The carapace is brown with a mottled clypeus and ocular area in yellow and white. It has a broad dark brown band medially with two yellow diffused bands radiating from the posterior lateral eyes to the edge of the carapace, and broad dark brown bands on the lateral sides. The carapace has a thin white line around the edge and is cubical in shape, truncated in front, and not sloping as strongly as in other species. It is wider than long, being 1.3 times wider posteriorly than anteriorly, and is clothed with small white-tipped tubercles that are more numerous around the posterior edge.

The opisthosoma is dorsally yellowish white with ill-defined blackish brown spots giving it a mottled appearance, becoming darker posteriorly and ventrally. The sternum varies from dark brown to yellowish with a brown rim. The legs show the characteristic banded pattern: coxae and trochanters have a distinct dark rim distally, femora are yellow with a blackish brown band distally, with the ventral surface usually having a black band medially. All leg segments have white rims distally.

The epigyne area is pigmented, and the spermathecae are triangular in shape with the sperm duct not clearly visible from below.

=== Males ===
Males are smaller than females, with total length around 3.2 mm.

They are darker in coloration than females, with a dark brown carapace having a white rim around the lateral edge and faint white median bands dorsally. The opisthosoma is dark brown, sometimes with small white-tipped tubercles. The legs are usually brown, except for the femora which are yellowish with a thin brown band distally.

=== Juveniles ===
Juveniles are similar to the female but with distinct yellow bands on the femur.

== Conservation status ==
The species is assessed as Least Concern due to its wide geographical range across Africa.
