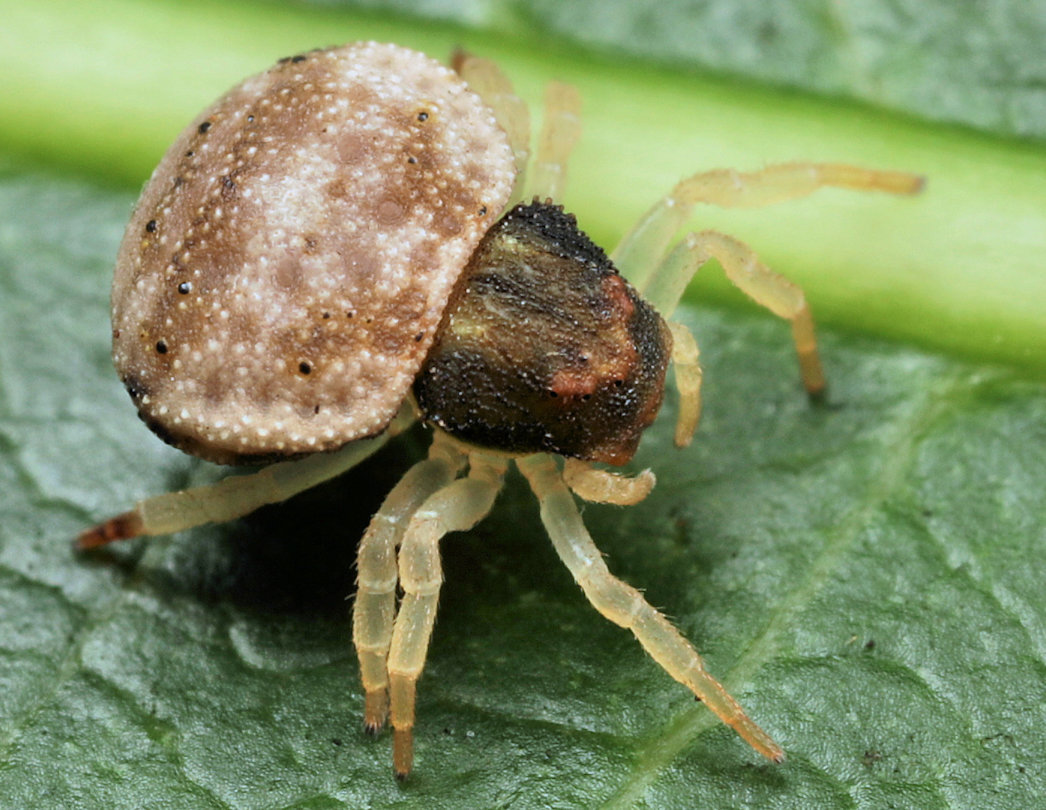
- T. bullatus from South Africa
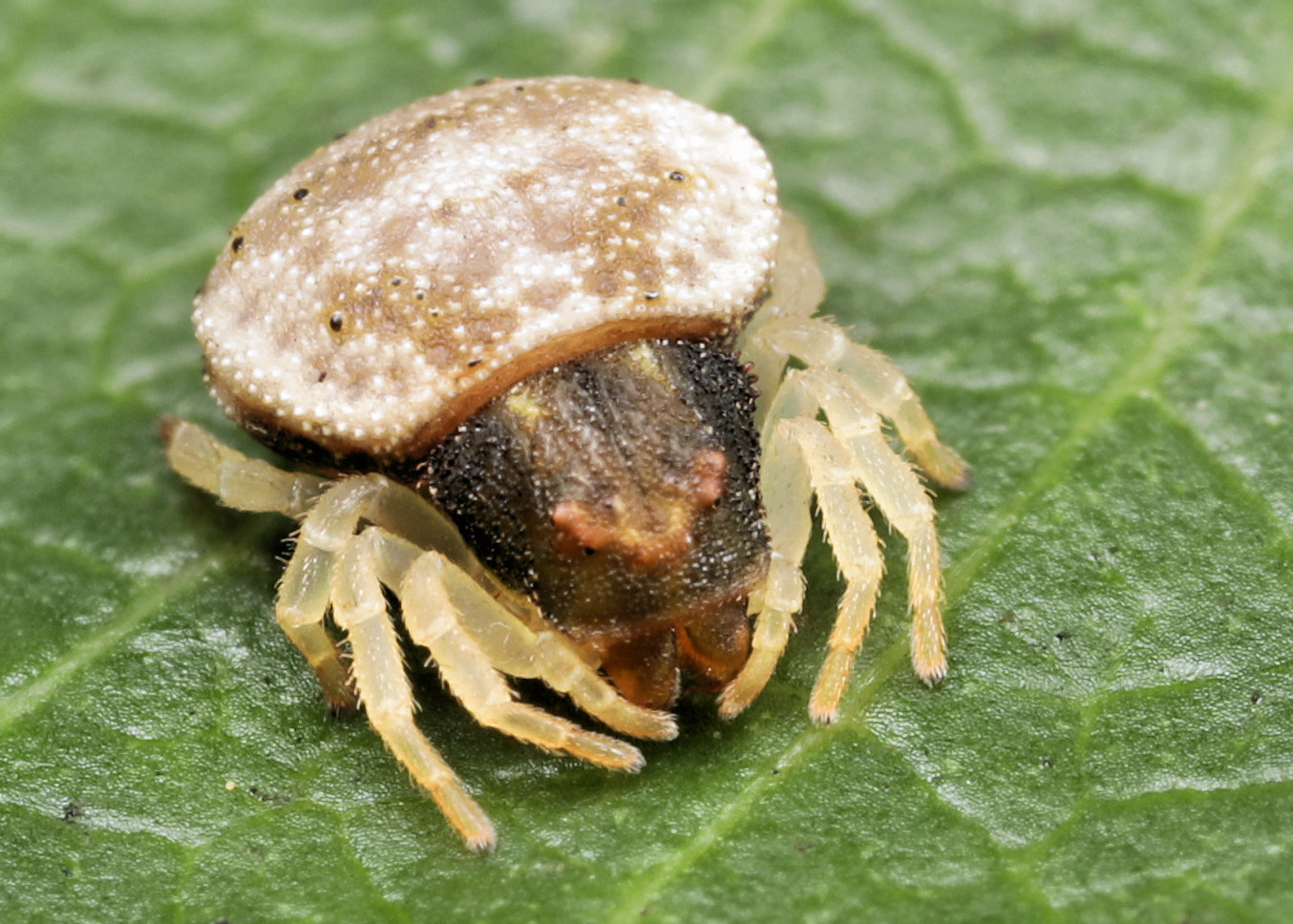

Conservation status
- Least Concern (IUCN 3.1)

Scientific classification
- Kingdom: Animalia
- Phylum: Arthropoda
- Subphylum: Chelicerata
- Class: Arachnida
- Order: Araneae
- Infraorder: Araneomorphae
- Family: Thomisidae
- Genus: Thomisops
- Species: T. bullatus

Binomial name
- Thomisops bullatus Simon, 1895

= Thomisops bullatus =

Species of crab spider

Thomisops bullatus is a species of crab spider of the genus Thomisops. It is endemic to southern Africa, where it occurs in Botswana and South Africa.

== Etymology ==
The specific name bullatus means "bubbled" in Latin, possibly referring to its body shape.

== Distribution ==
Thomisops bullatus has been recorded from Botswana and South Africa. In South Africa, the species is known from five provinces: Eastern Cape, Gauteng, KwaZulu-Natal, Limpopo, and Mpumalanga. The species was originally described from Hammanskraal in Gauteng.

== Habitat ==
Thomisops bullatus is a free-living plant dweller that inhabits small bushes in the herbaceous layer and grass areas. The species has been collected from diverse biomes including Forest, Indian Ocean Coastal Belt, Thicket, Grassland and Savanna. It occurs at elevations ranging from 5 to 1,412 metres (16 to 4,633 ft) above sea level.

== Description ==
The female of Thomisops bullatus has a triangular-shaped carapace that differs from related species by having numerous tubercles on the body, legs and pedipalps. The carapace is reddish brown and darker laterally, with a faint black network pattern posteriorly. The posterior edge is usually reddish with yellow and brown longitudinal lines and patterns that are more distinct on the femur. The opisthosoma is wider than long, with sides rounded and truncated anteriorly, and is clothed with numerous small polyp-like tubercles each bearing a brown curved seta.

The male is darker and smaller than the female. The carapace is 1.3 times wider posteriorly than anteriorly, with dark brown posterior lateral edge (PLE) situated on small tubercles, paler in colour with a white rim around the edge. The carapace slopes less than in the female and is more cube-like in shape, with tubercles less distinct than in the female.

== Bionomics ==
Females have been collected from September to January, while males have been collected from September to December. The species is collected using sweep nets in herbaceous layers and from small bushes.

== Conservation ==
Thomisops bullatus is listed as Least Concern due to its wide distribution range. It is recorded from ten protected areas including Addo Elephant National Park, Ndumo Game Reserve, and Nylsvley Nature Reserve.
