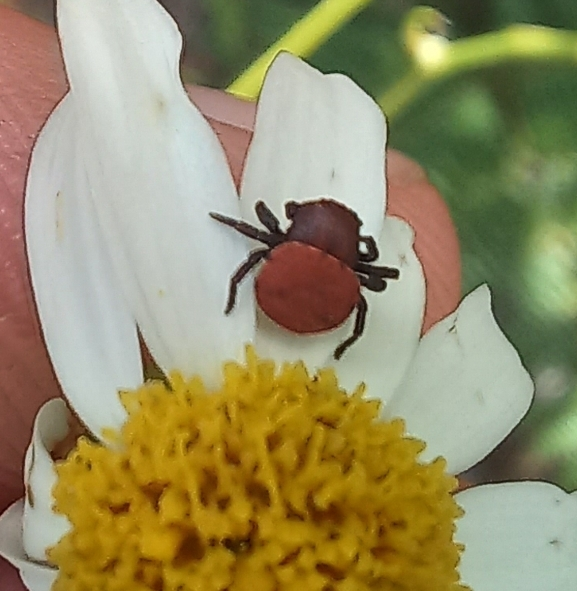

Scientific classification
- Kingdom: Animalia
- Phylum: Arthropoda
- Subphylum: Chelicerata
- Class: Arachnida
- Order: Araneae
- Infraorder: Araneomorphae
- Family: Thomisidae
- Genus: Thomisops
- Species: T. melanopes

Binomial name
- Thomisops melanopes Dippenaar-Schoeman, 1989

= Thomisops melanopes =

Dark Thomisops crab spider

Species of spider

Thomisops melanopes is a species of crab spider in the family Thomisidae. It is endemic to South Africa. The species is known only from males.

== Etymology ==
The specific name melanopes refers to the black legs of the species.

== Taxonomy ==
Thomisops melanopes was first described by Ansie Dippenaar-Schoeman in 1989 based on male specimens collected from the Western Cape of South Africa. The holotype is deposited in the National Collection of Arachnida at the ARC Plant Protection Research Institute in Pretoria.

== Distribution ==
Thomisops melanopes is endemic to South Africa and has been recorded from five provinces. It occurs in the Eastern Cape, KwaZulu-Natal, Mpumalanga, North West, and Western Cape provinces at elevations ranging from 9 to 1,415 metres above sea level.

The species has been found at several localities including the Hex River mountains near Ceres, Table Mountain, Kirstenbosch National Botanical Garden, Mkuze Game Reserve, and the Great Fish River area.

== Habitat ==
Thomisops melanopes is free-living on plants and is occasionally found inside flower corollas. The species has been sampled from three biomes: Fynbos, Savanna, and Thicket. Specimens have been collected from grass using sweep nets.

== Description ==
Only males of Thomisops melanopes are known, with females remaining undescribed. Males have a total length of 2.5–3 mm.

The cephalothorax is reddish brown to brown, usually darker laterally, with a distinct white rim around the lateral edge. The eye area is suffused with white, with thin lines stretching from the posterior lateral eyes to the posterior edge. The legs are predominantly black, with only the metatarsi and tarsi of the first two pairs of legs being pale, while the tibiae, metatarsi and tarsi of the posterior legs are usually mottled with white.

The opisthosoma is shield-like in shape and yellowish red to reddish brown, mottled with faint black patterns. The lateral sides are white, with a white rim usually visible from above, while the ventral surface is black.

The distinguishing features of males include the shape of the pedipalps, particularly the retrolateral tibial apophysis which is slightly shorter than half the length of the bulb, and a strong seta on the inner side of the tibia.

== Conservation ==
Thomisops melanopes is classified as Least Concern due to its wide geographical range across South Africa. The species has been recorded in five protected areas including Mkuzi Game Reserve, Sungulwane Game Reserve, Bellville Nature Reserve, Kirstenbosch National Botanical Garden, and Table Mountain National Park. No known threats have been identified, though more sampling is needed to collect and describe the female.
