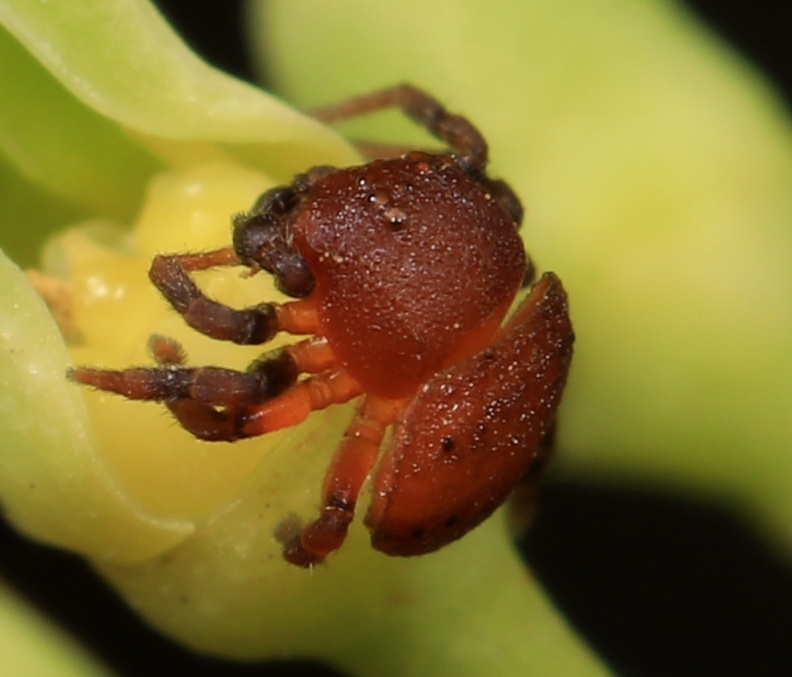
- from South Africa
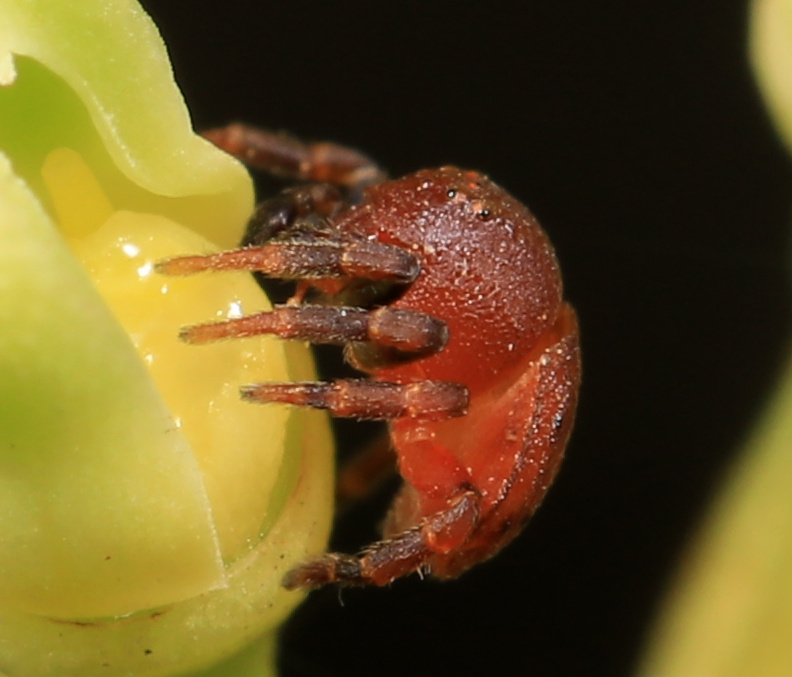

Scientific classification
- Kingdom: Animalia
- Phylum: Arthropoda
- Subphylum: Chelicerata
- Class: Arachnida
- Order: Araneae
- Infraorder: Araneomorphae
- Family: Thomisidae
- Genus: Thomisops
- Species: T. senegalensis

Binomial name
- Thomisops senegalensis Millot, 1942

= Thomisops senegalensis =

Senegal Thomisops crab spider

Species of crab spider

Thomisops senegalensis is a species of crab spider in the genus Thomisops. It was first described by Jacques Millot in 1942 from Senegal, and is widely distributed across sub-Saharan Africa.

== Taxonomy ==
The species was originally described by Jacques Millot in 1942 based on specimens from Dakar, Senegal.

== Distribution ==
Thomisops senegalensis has a wide distribution across sub-Saharan Africa. It has been recorded from Senegal, Nigeria, Cameroon, Democratic Republic of the Congo, Botswana, Zimbabwe, and South Africa. In South Africa, it occurs in five provinces: Eastern Cape, KwaZulu-Natal, Mpumalanga, Northern Cape, and Western Cape.

== Habitat ==
The species is free-living on plants and has been collected mainly from grass and trees, but also from citrus orchards. In South Africa, it has been sampled from Forest, Savanna, Indian Ocean Coastal Belt and Thicket biomes, at elevations ranging from 5 to 1,156 metres above sea level.

== Description ==
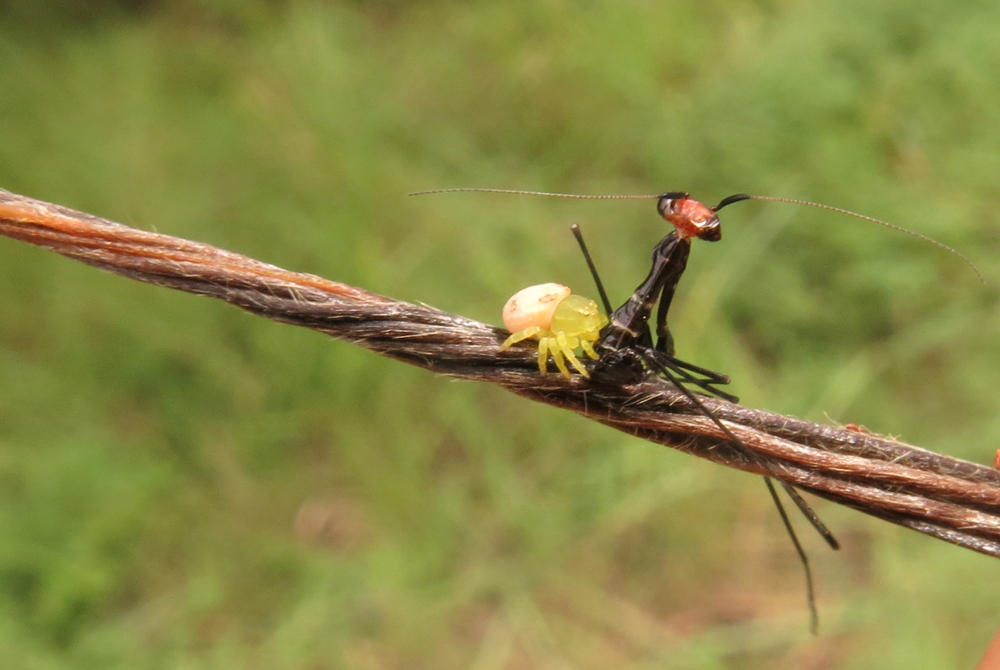
preying on mantis

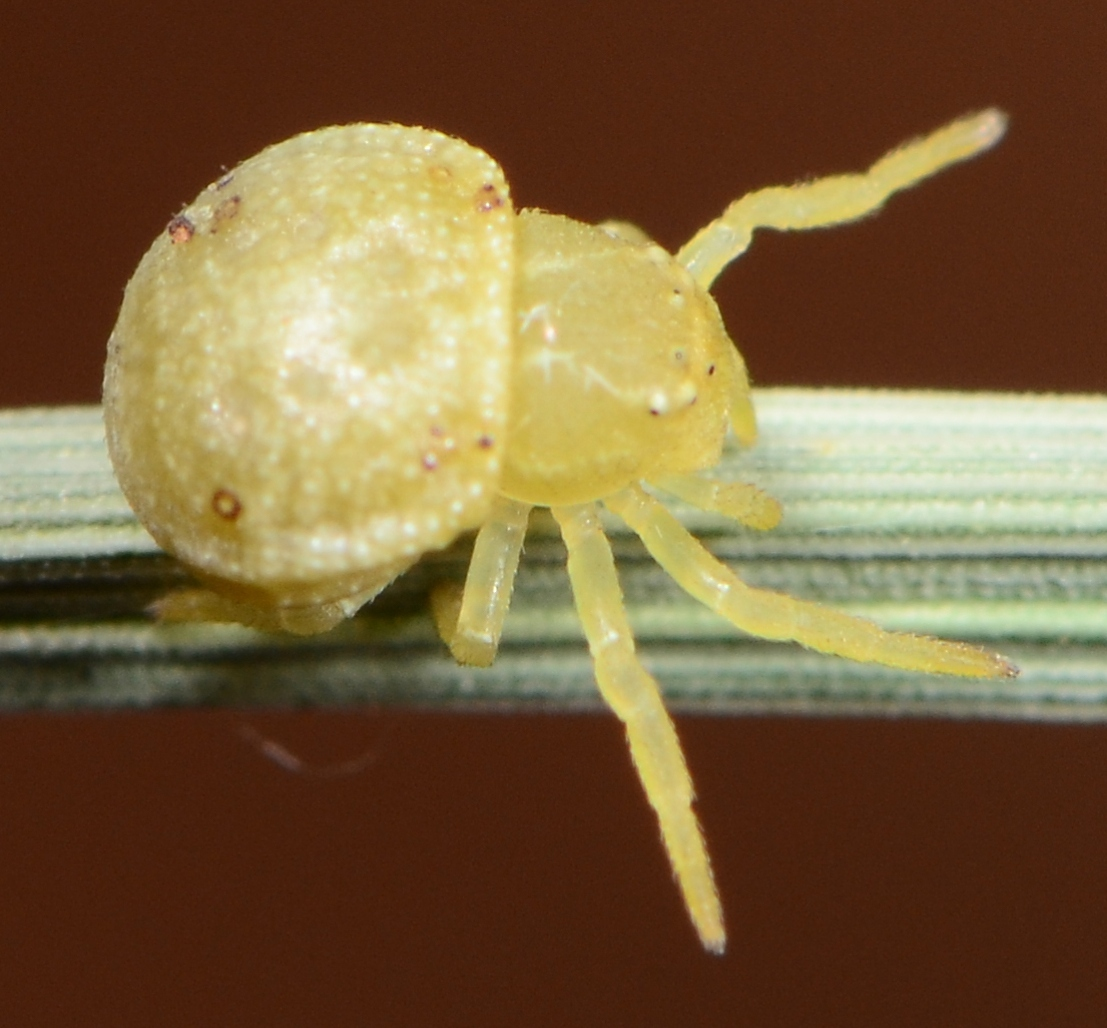
female

Thomisops senegalensis are small spiders with a distinctive strongly sloping carapace.

Females are larger than males, with a total length of 4.40 mm. The carapace is fawn-coloured with a brown band running down the middle and to the sides, with thin white lines stretching from the posterior median eyes to the posterior edge. The eye area is white. The opisthosoma is white, mottled with grey and displaying numerous circular patterns that differ from those of related species. The area around the spinnerets is darker. The legs are fawn-coloured with darker edges on the first and second pairs of femora and tibiae. The sternum and underside of the abdomen are pale.

Males are smaller, with a total length of 2.76 mm. They are generally darker than females, usually displaying distinct white lines stretching from the posterior lateral eyes to the posterior edge of the carapace. The carapace is covered with numerous curved club-shaped setae, which are more numerous on the sides. The abdomen is reddish brown with a few black spots and appears shield-like, being pale on the underside with a dark border at the rear. The legs are pale yellowish brown, with the first and second pairs of femora being slightly darker.

Both sexes have a coarsely granulated carapace integument, especially on the sides, with tubercles bearing dark club-shaped setae.

== Conservation status ==
The species is classified as Least Concern due to its wide geographical range across multiple African countries. It has been recorded from several protected areas including Kosi Bay Nature Reserve, Sodwana Bay Nature Reserve, and Tswalu Kalahari Reserve.
