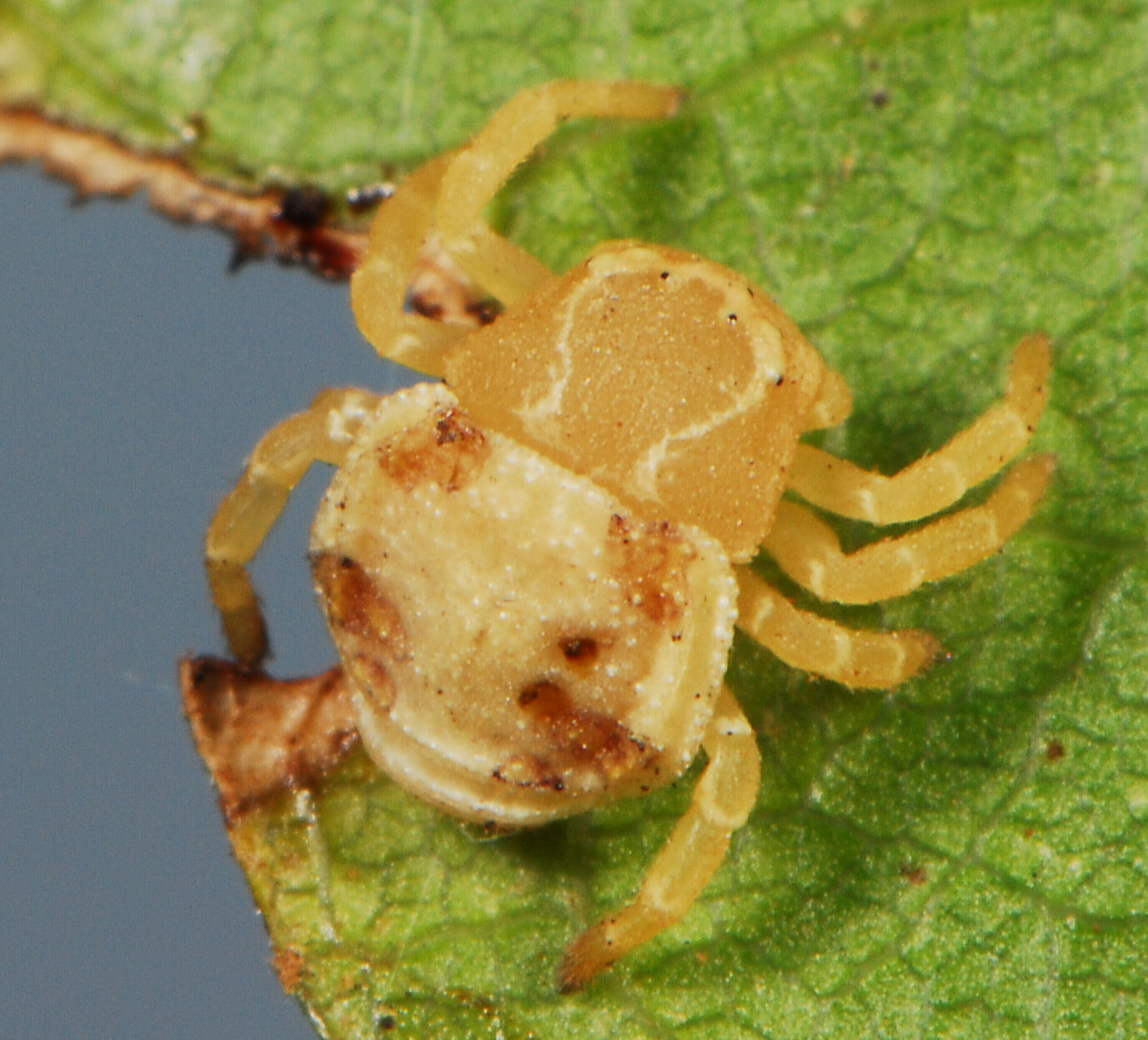
- Female
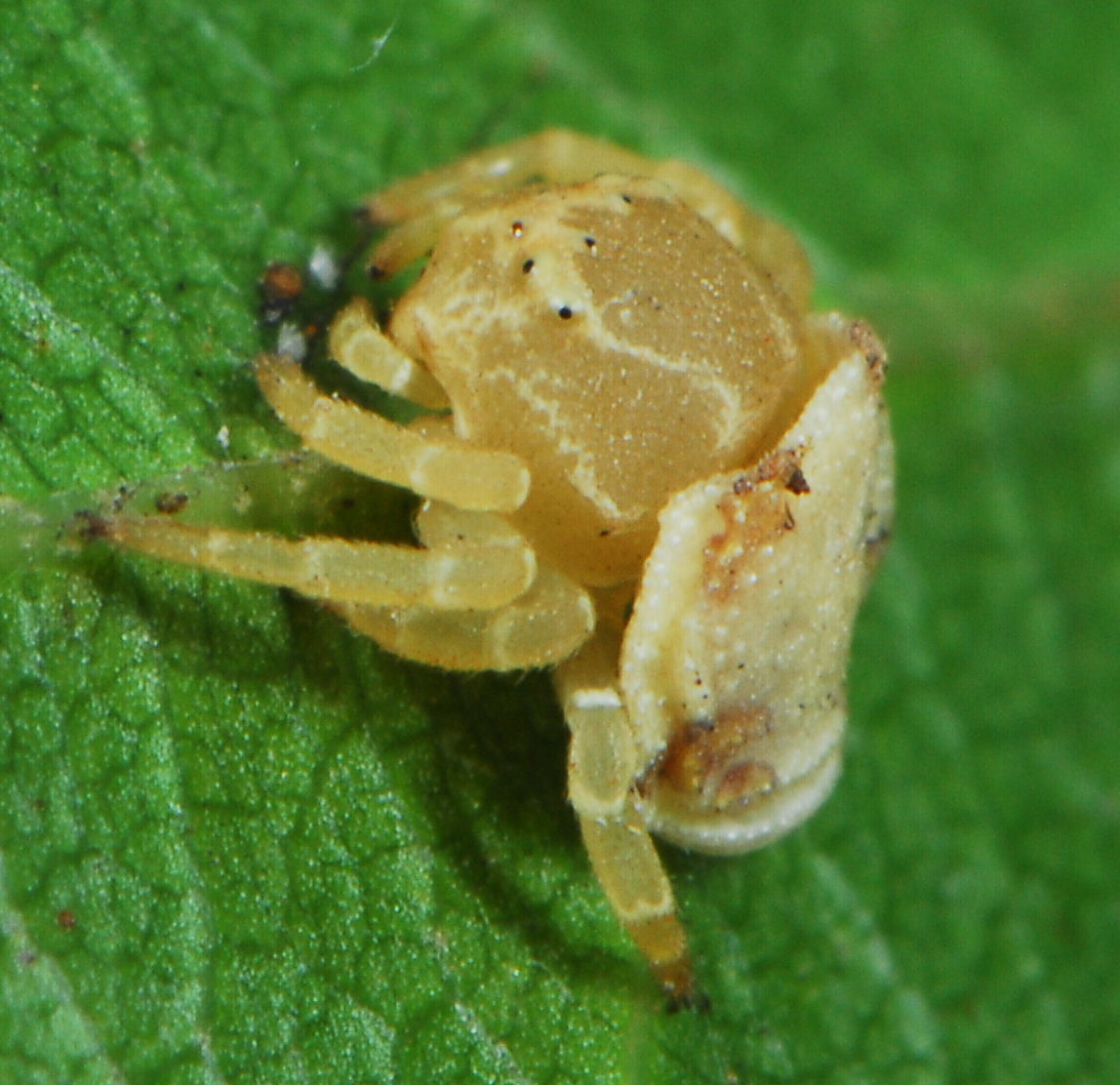
- Female

Scientific classification
- Kingdom: Animalia
- Phylum: Arthropoda
- Subphylum: Chelicerata
- Class: Arachnida
- Order: Araneae
- Infraorder: Araneomorphae
- Family: Thomisidae
- Genus: Thomisops
- Species: T. lesserti

Binomial name
- Thomisops lesserti Millot, 1942

Synonyms
- Thomisops eremita Lawrence, 1952

= Thomisops lesserti =

Species of spider

Thomisops lesserti is a species of crab spider in the family Thomisidae. It is found across sub-Saharan Africa, from Senegal and Guinea in the west to the Democratic Republic of the Congo and South Africa in the south.

== Distribution ==
Thomisops lesserti has been recorded from Senegal, Guinea, Democratic Republic of the Congo, and South Africa. In South Africa, it is known from three provinces: the Eastern Cape, Gauteng, and KwaZulu-Natal.

The species has been collected from elevations ranging from 87 to 1,086 metres above sea level.

== Habitat ==
Thomisops lesserti is a free-living species found on plants in various biomes including Forest, Grassland, and Savanna. Specimens have been collected from grass using sweepnets, and one specimen was found in association with fungal growth in a termite nest.

== Description ==
Both male and female T. lesserti are distinguished from other Thomisops species by their distinctive opisthosoma shape, which is slightly longer than wide with parallel sides.

=== Female ===
Females have a total length of 4.3 mm, with a cephalothorax length of 1.7 mm and width of 2.0 mm. The cephalothorax is pale yellow with a reddish tint towards the edges, marked by two thin, broken, yellowish-white longitudinal lines stretching from the posterior lateral eyes to the posterior edge. The eyes are circled with white.

The abdomen is pale brown to white, decorated dorsally with several brownish-black concentric circles, which may fade to brown patches in some specimens. The mouthparts, sternum, and legs are pale yellow, with the metatarsi and tarsi appearing slightly darker.

The cephalothorax is convex and slightly sloping anteriorly, being 1.4 times wider posteriorly than anteriorly, with distinct rims along the posterolateral edges.

=== Male ===
Males are smaller than females, with a total length of 3.12 mm, cephalothorax length of 1.36 mm, and width of 1.64 mm. They are generally darker in coloration, with a dark reddish-brown cephalothorax and a reddish-brown abdomen marked with faded black patterns and faint white concentric lines visible above the spinnerets.

The legs show distinctive coloration: the coxae, trochanters, and tarsi of legs I and II are pale yellow, while the remaining leg segments are dark, except for tarsi I and II which are also yellow. Most leg segments have a thin white line distally.

The male pedipalp is black with a long, thin retrolateral tibial apophysis that is 0.7 times shorter than half the length of the tibia. A distinctive feature of this species is that the embolus of the male palp originates off-centre.

=== Juvenile ===
Juveniles are similar to females in both abdominal shape and coloration.

== Etymology ==
The species is named after Swiss arachnologist Roger de Lessert (1878–1945), who made significant contributions to African spider taxonomy.

== Taxonomy ==
Thomisops lesserti was first described by Jacques Millot in 1942 based on a female holotype from Guinea. In 1952, Reginald Frederick Lawrence described Thomisops eremita from the Democratic Republic of the Congo, but this was later determined to be a synonym of T. lesserti by Ansie Dippenaar-Schoeman in 1989, based on similarities in the male palp structure and abdominal morphology.

== Conservation status ==
In South Africa, Thomisops lesserti is classified as Least Concern due to its wide geographical range across multiple African countries. The species has been recorded in protected areas including Fort Grey Forest Reserve and Hluhluwe Nature Reserve, and no specific conservation threats have been identified.
