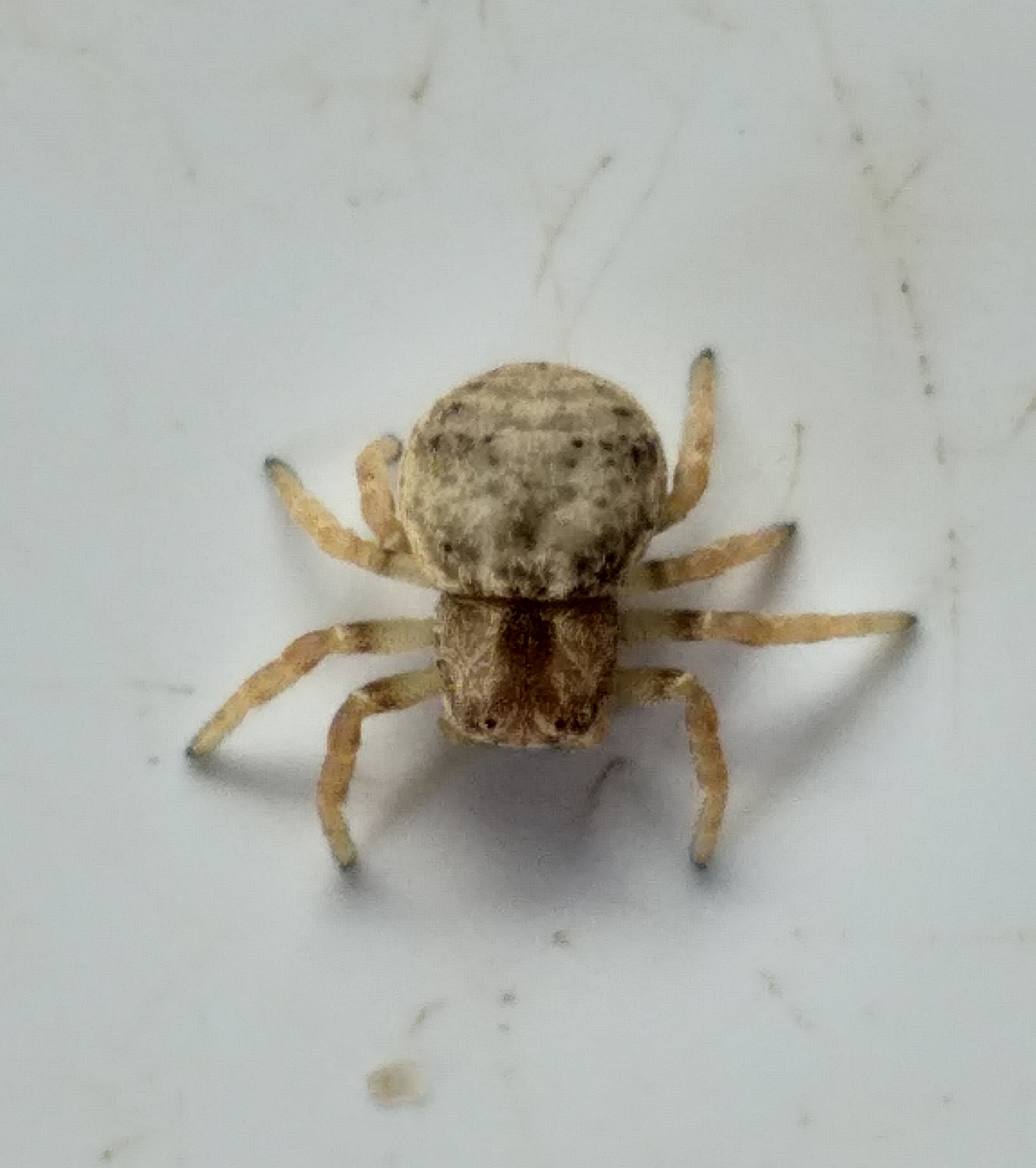

Scientific classification
- Kingdom: Animalia
- Phylum: Arthropoda
- Subphylum: Chelicerata
- Class: Arachnida
- Order: Araneae
- Infraorder: Araneomorphae
- Family: Thomisidae
- Genus: Holopelus
- Species: H. albibarbis

Binomial name
- Holopelus albibarbis Simon, 1895

= Holopelus albibarbis =

Species of spider

Holopelus albibarbis is a species of spider in the family Thomisidae.

== Distribution ==
Holopelus albibarbis has been found in Equatorial Guinea (Bioko) and South Africa. This species is undercollected and is suspected to occur in more African countries.

In South Africa, it is known from Eastern Cape, Northern Cape, and Western Cape.

== Habitat and ecology ==
It has been collected from trees and low shrubs at altitudes ranging from 6 to 1513 m. Adults were collected in October and March from the Fynbos, Grassland, Savanna and Thicket biomes.

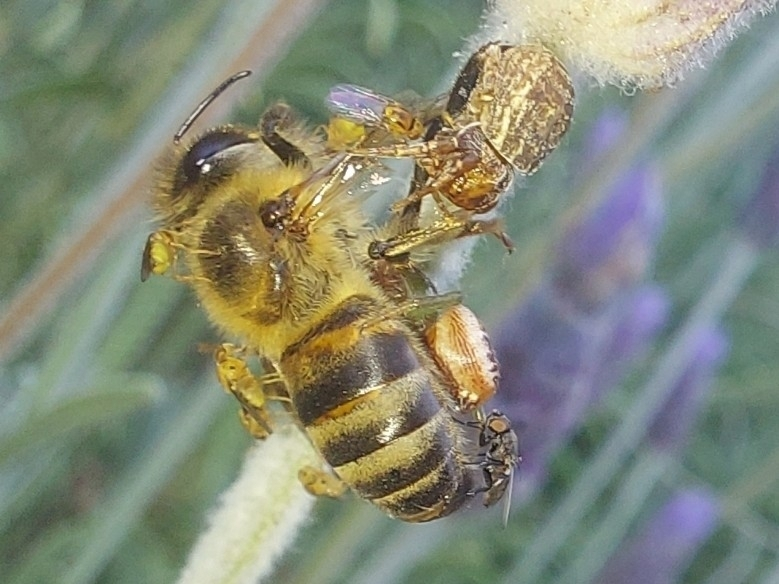
with bee

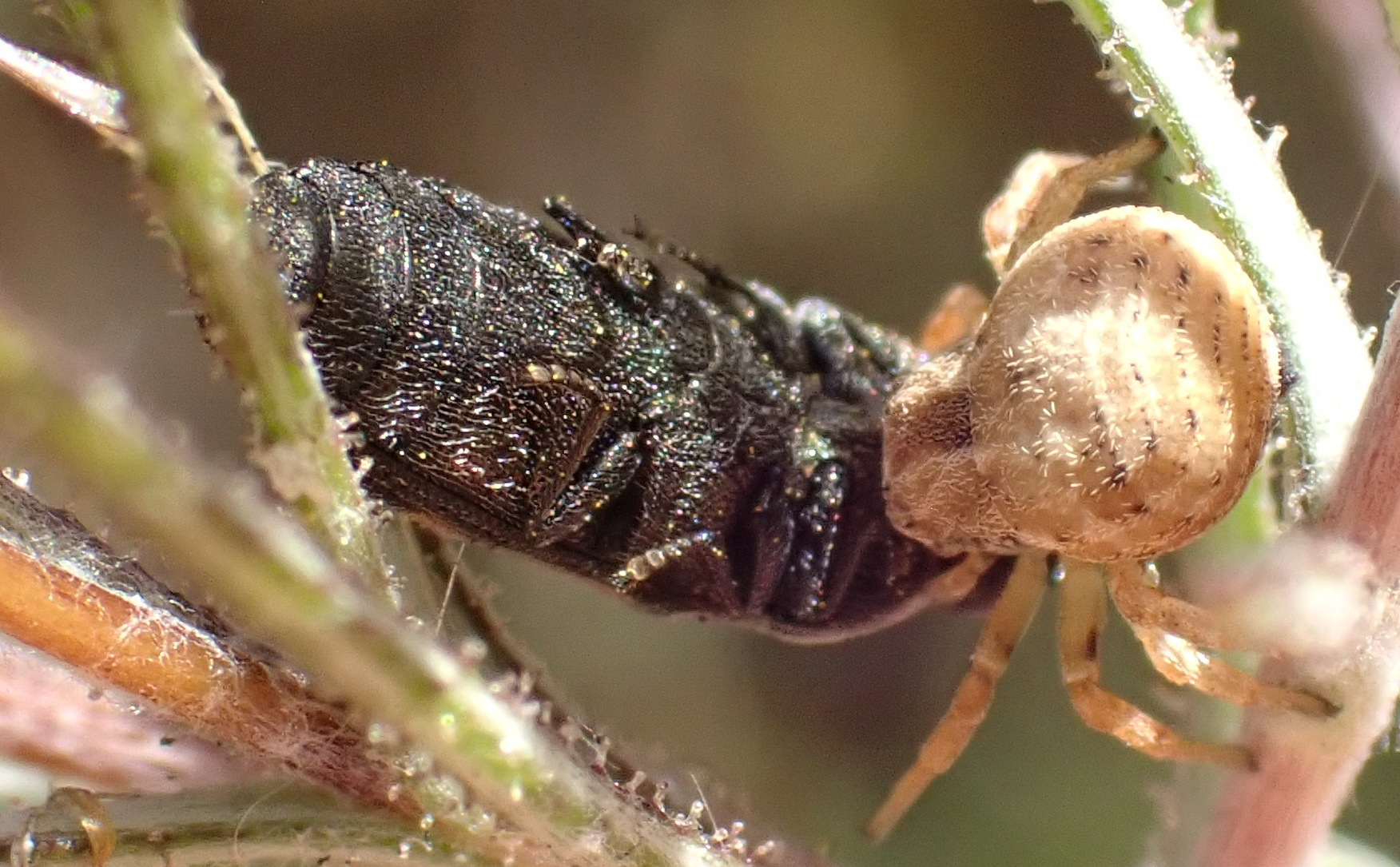
with beetle

== Conservation ==
Holopelus albibarbis is protected in Fort Brown Kudu Reserve, Mountain Zebra National Park, Tswalu Game Reserve, Karoo National Park, Keurboom Forest Reserve and Cederberg Wilderness Area. Due to its large range, the species is listed as Least Concern by the South African National Biodiversity Institute.

== Taxonomy ==
Holopelus albibarbis was described by Simon in 1895 from Stellenbosch in the Western Cape. The species was revised by Dippenaar-Schoeman in 1986.
