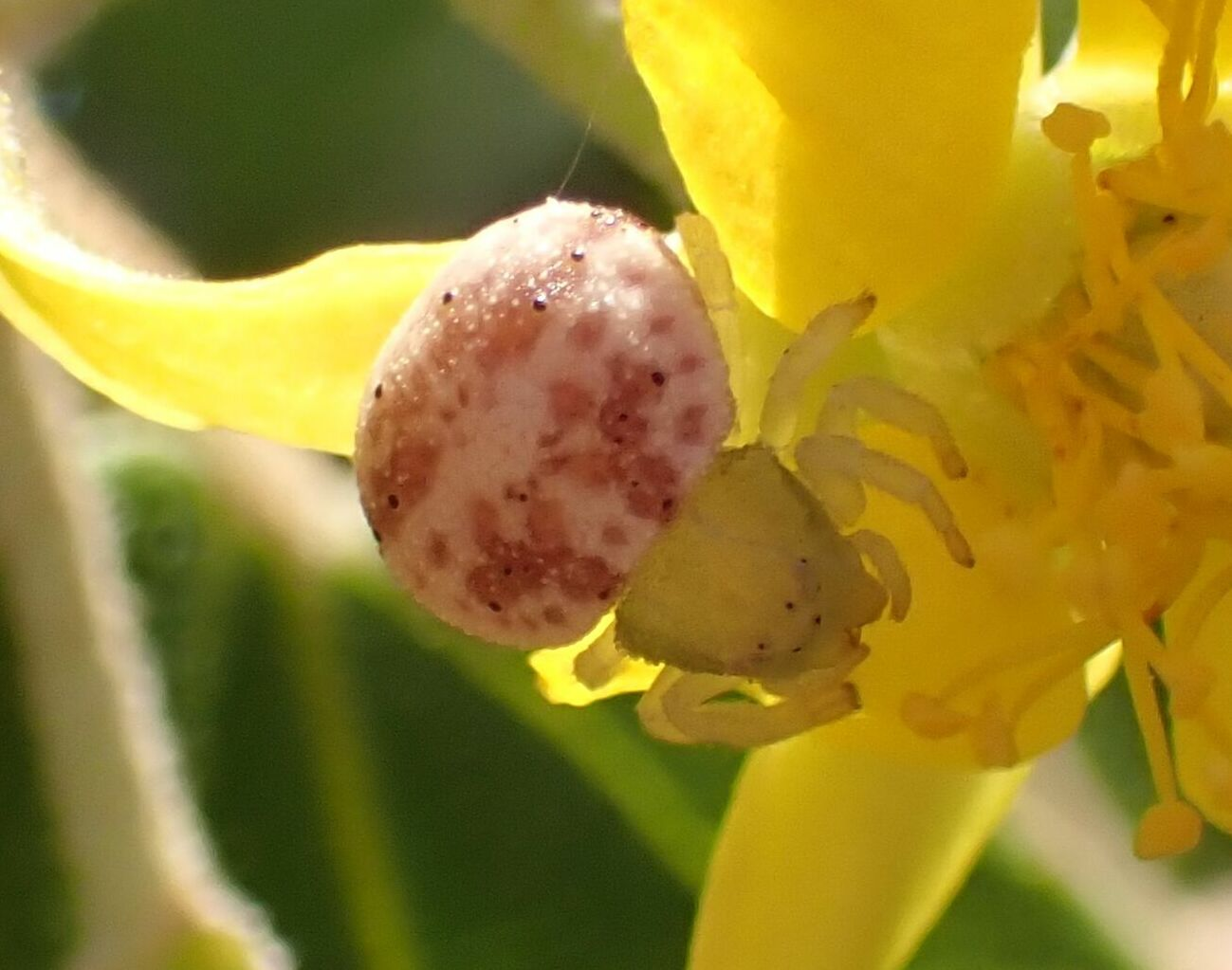
- T. granulatus from South Africa

Conservation status
- Least Concern (IUCN 3.1)

Scientific classification
- Kingdom: Animalia
- Phylum: Arthropoda
- Subphylum: Chelicerata
- Class: Arachnida
- Order: Araneae
- Infraorder: Araneomorphae
- Family: Thomisidae
- Genus: Thomisops
- Species: T. granulatus

Binomial name
- Thomisops granulatus Dippenaar-Schoeman, 1989

= Thomisops granulatus =

Granulated thomisops crab spider

Species of spider

Thomisops granulatus is a species of crab spider in the family Thomisidae. It is endemic to southern Africa, where it is found in South Africa and Zimbabwe.

== Etymology ==
The specific name granulatus refers to the coarse granulation of the body, which is a distinctive characteristic of this species.

== Distribution ==
Thomisops granulatus is known from South Africa and Zimbabwe. In South Africa, it has been recorded from the Eastern Cape and KwaZulu-Natal provinces. The species occurs at elevations ranging from 15 to 345 metres above sea level.

Specific localities include the Buffalo River Pass in the Eastern Cape, and several sites in KwaZulu-Natal including Hluhluwe Nature Reserve, Dukuduku Forest Station, and the Umhlatuze River mouth.

== Habitat ==
Thomisops granulatus is free-living on plants and has been collected from grass and herbs using sweep nets. The species inhabits Forest, Savanna, and Thicket biomes. It has been found in areas where both ants and termites are abundant, suggesting a possible association with these insects.

== Description ==
Thomisops granulatus is distinguished by its very coarse granulation of the carapace and legs, making it unique among species in the genus Thomisops. It is the only species in the genus whose leg segments have distinct tubercles topped with club-shaped setae.

Females are larger than males and have a total length of 4 mm. The female carapace is yellowish brown, darker at the sides, with a clear white rim around the lateral edge. The opisthosoma is creamy white with a few irregular small dark spots. The sternum is yellow with a black rim. The legs have distinctive mottled patterns with white, pale yellow, and brown coloration.

The female carapace is 1.5 times wider posteriorly than anteriorly and is almost triangular in shape with a truncated anterior end. The integument is granulous and clothed with numerous round, polyp-like tubercles, each bearing a brown club-shaped curved seta. The epigyne has spermathecal orifices that are circular in shape on both sides.

Males are darker and smaller than females, with a total length of 2.36 mm. The male carapace is 1.3 times wider posteriorly than anteriorly and is dark brown with a white rim around the edge. The opisthosoma is flattened and shield-like in appearance, yellow with irregular black patches and grey sides mottled with white.

Juveniles are paler in colour and strongly mottled, with white tubercles bearing very prominent setae.

== Conservation ==
Thomisops granulatus is classified as Least Concern due to its wide geographical range. It is recorded from two protected areas: Dukuduku Forest Station and Hluhluwe Nature Reserve. No known threats have been identified, and no specific conservation actions are recommended.
