= Holopelus piger =

Scientific classification
- Kingdom: Animalia
- Phylum: Arthropoda
- Subphylum: Chelicerata
- Class: Arachnida
- Order: Araneae
- Infraorder: Araneomorphae
- Family: Thomisidae
- Genus: Holopelus
- Species: H. piger

Binomial name
- Holopelus piger O. Pickard-Cambridge, 1899

Species of spider

Holopelus piger is a species of spiders of the genus Holopelus. It is endemic to Sri Lanka.

== See also ==
- List of Thomisidae species
