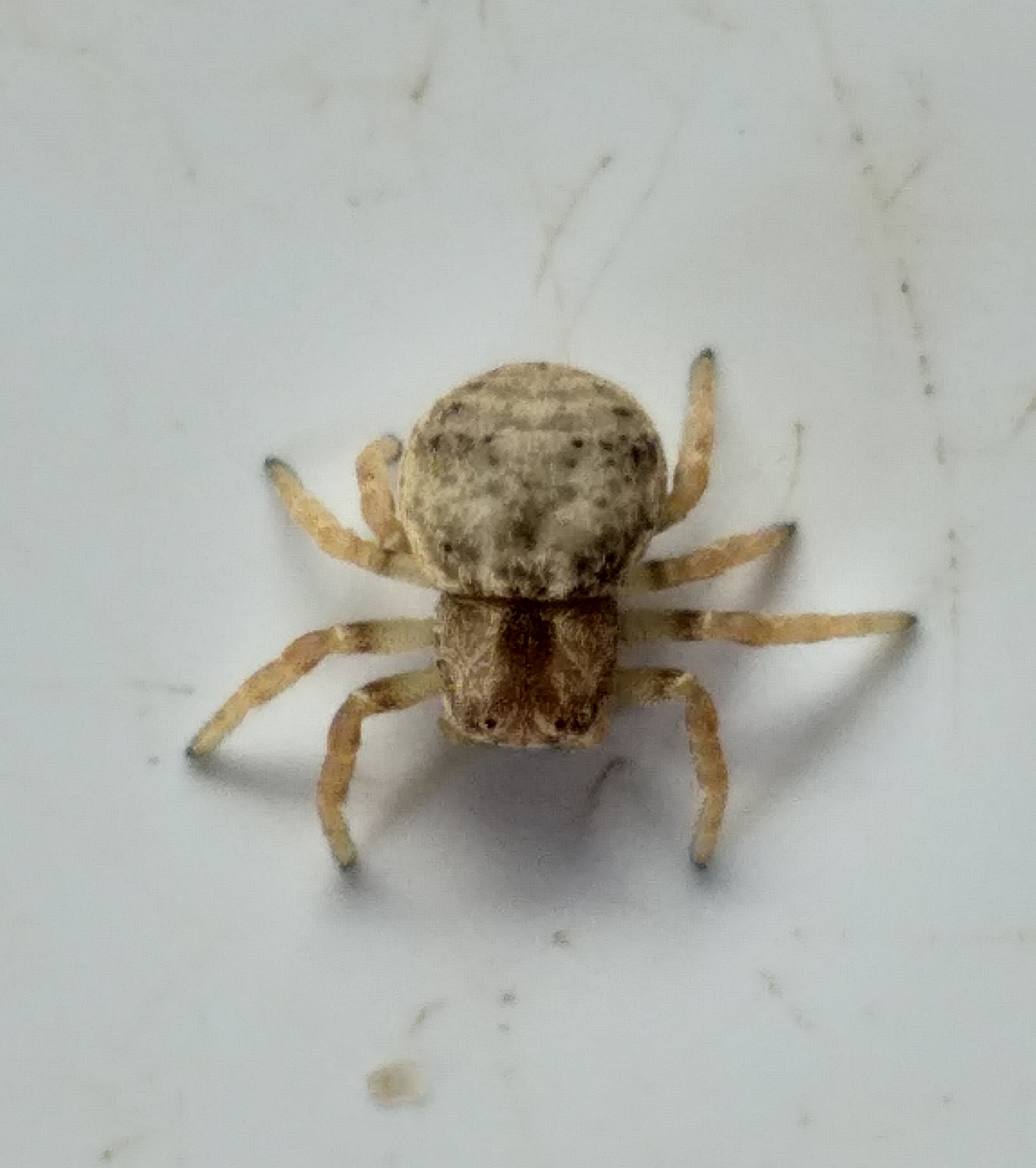
- H. albibarbis
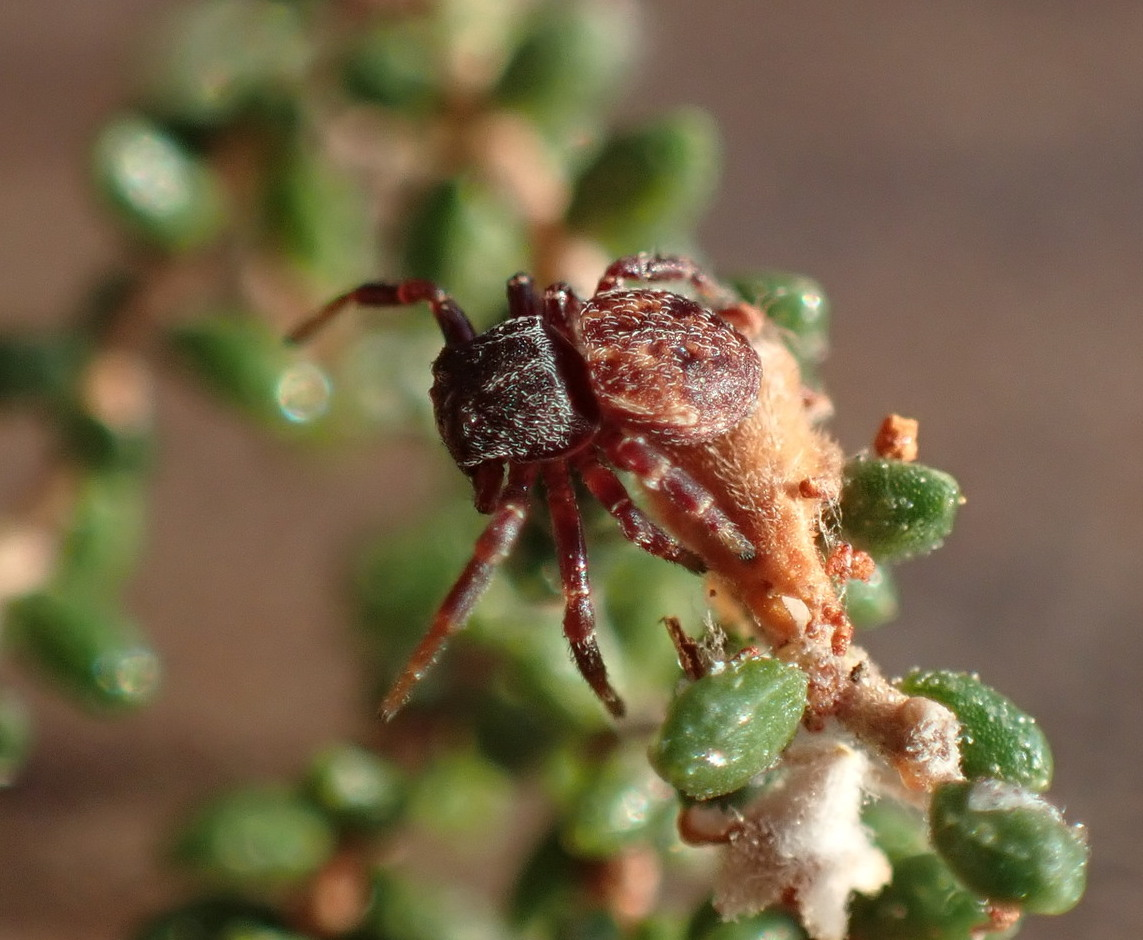
- H. almiae

Scientific classification
- Kingdom: Animalia
- Phylum: Arthropoda
- Subphylum: Chelicerata
- Class: Arachnida
- Order: Araneae
- Infraorder: Araneomorphae
- Family: Thomisidae
- Genus: Holopelus; Simon, 1886

Type species
- H. bufoninus Simon, 1886

Species
- 7, see text

= Holopelus =

Genus of spiders

Holopelus is a genus of crab spiders that was first described by Eugène Louis Simon in 1886.

== Distribution ==
Spiders in this genus are found in Africa and Asia.

== Life style ==
Holopelus live mainly on grass and low shrubs. Their small and straw-coloured bodies camouflage them extremely well.

They are collected by beating and sweep netting grasses and shrubs. Although widely distributed, they are not very common.

== Description ==
Holopelus spiders measure 3 to 4 mm in total length.

Their colour is yellowish brown to reddish brown, sometimes with dark or paler patches. The carapace is as wide as it is long, cubic in shape with sides rounded and anteriorly truncated, broad and obtuse. The dorsal area is elevated and flattened with a keeled posterior declivity, clothed with numerous polyp-like tubercles each bearing a short club-shaped seta.

The abdomen is round and brown with polyp-like tubercles. Legs are uniformly yellowish brown with the distal part of each segment white.

== Taxonomy ==
The genus was revised by Dippenaar-Schoeman in 1986.

== Species ==
As of October 2025, this genus includes seven species:

- Holopelus albibarbis Simon, 1895 – Equatorial Guinea (Bioko), South Africa
- Holopelus almiae Dippenaar-Schoeman, 1986 – South Africa
- Holopelus bufoninus Simon, 1886 – Indonesia (Sumatra) (type species)
- Holopelus crassiceps (Strand, 1913) – Central Africa
- Holopelus irroratus (Thorell, 1899) – Cameroon
- Holopelus malati Simon, 1895 – India
- Holopelus piger O. Pickard-Cambridge, 1899 – Sri Lanka

== See also ==
- List of Thomisidae species
