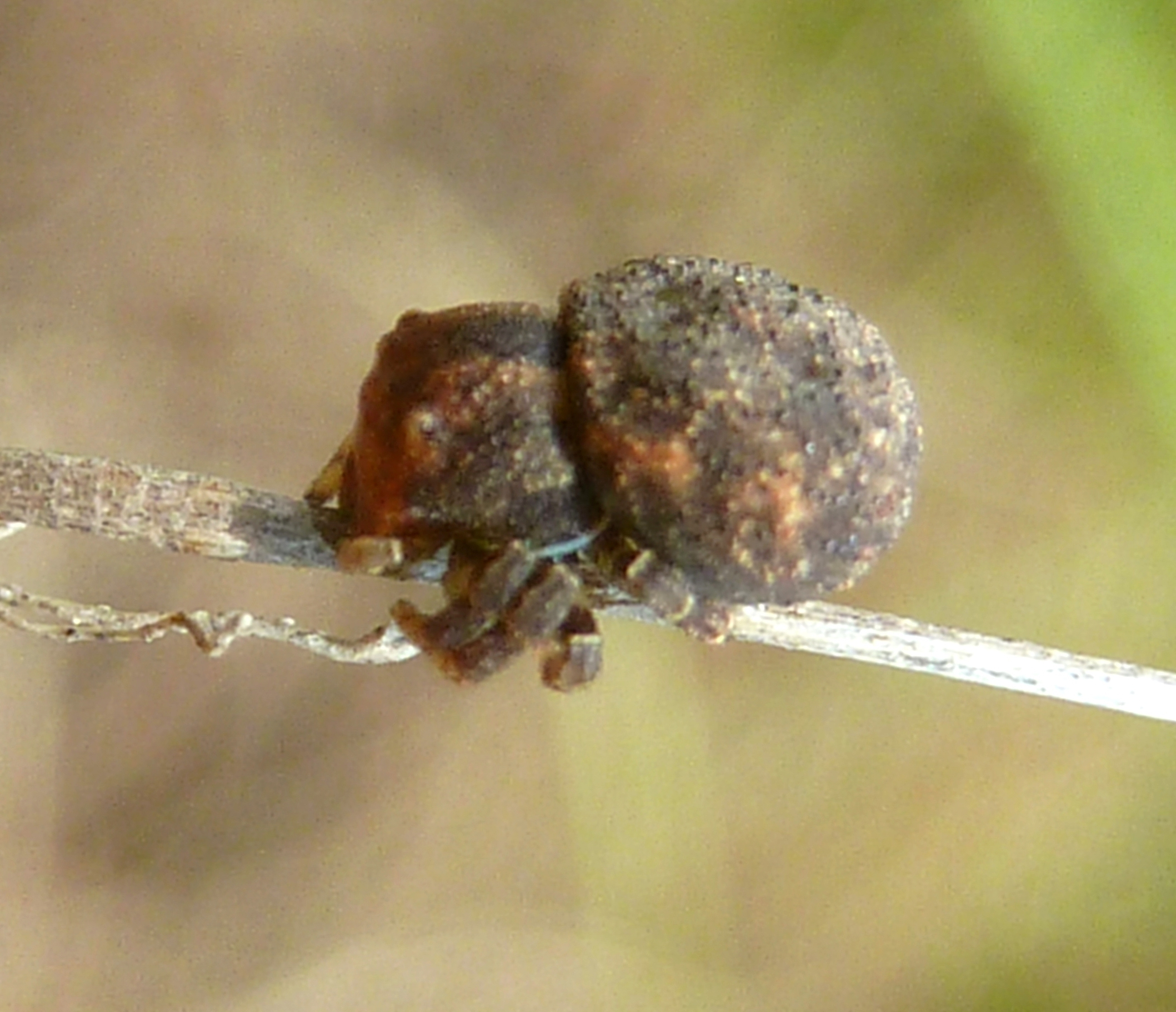
- T. sulcatus in South Africa
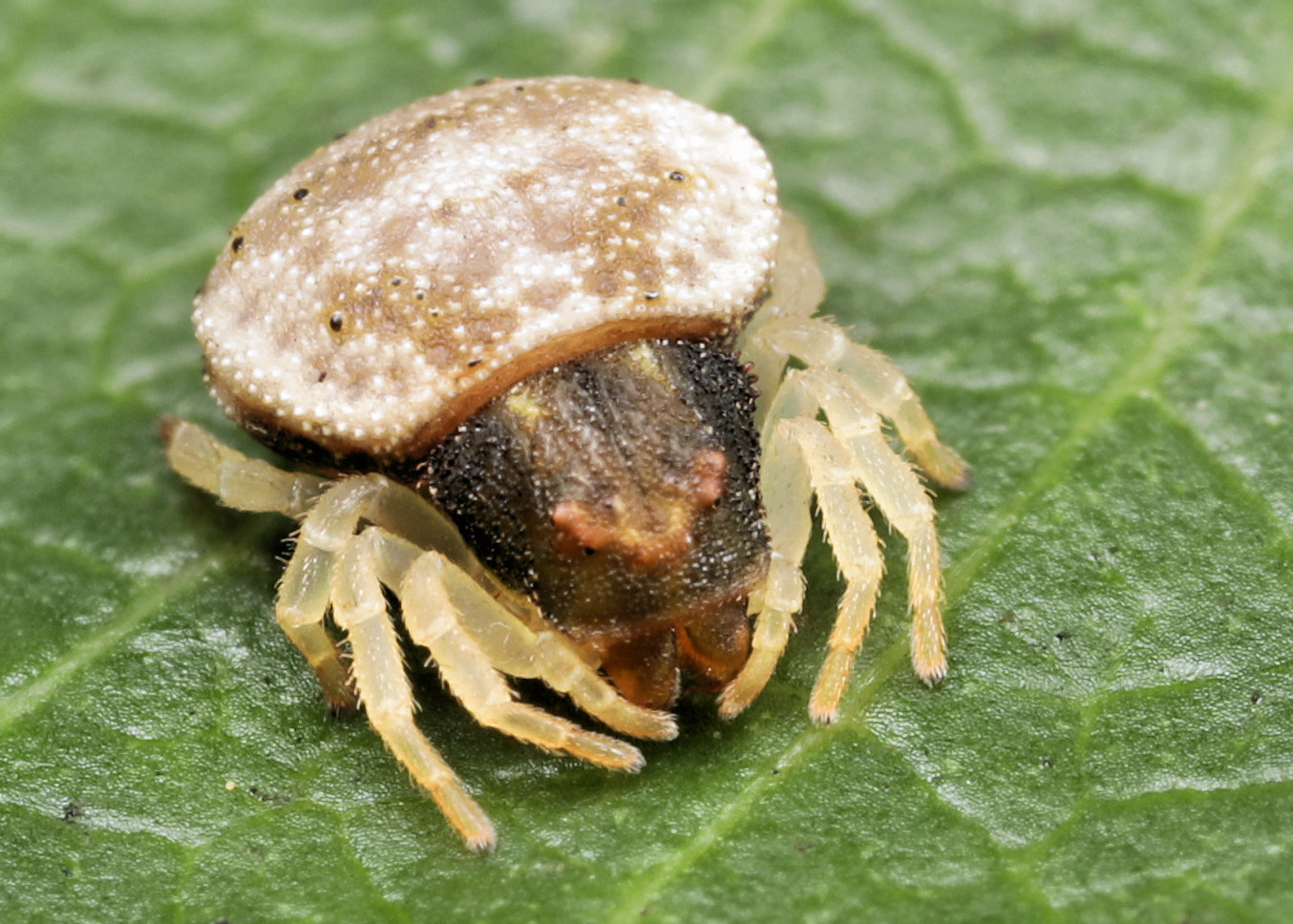
- T. bullatus in South Africa

Scientific classification
- Kingdom: Animalia
- Phylum: Arthropoda
- Subphylum: Chelicerata
- Class: Arachnida
- Order: Araneae
- Infraorder: Araneomorphae
- Family: Thomisidae
- Genus: Thomisops; Karsch

Type species
- Thomisops pupa

Species
- 10, see text

= Thomisops =

Genus of spiders

Thomisops is a genus of spiders in the family Thomisidae. It was first described in 1879 by Ferdinand Karsch. As of 2025, it contains eight species from Africa, and two from China.

== Name ==
The genus name is a combination of the crab spider genus Thomisus and Ancient Greek ὤψ (ops) "eye".

== Species ==
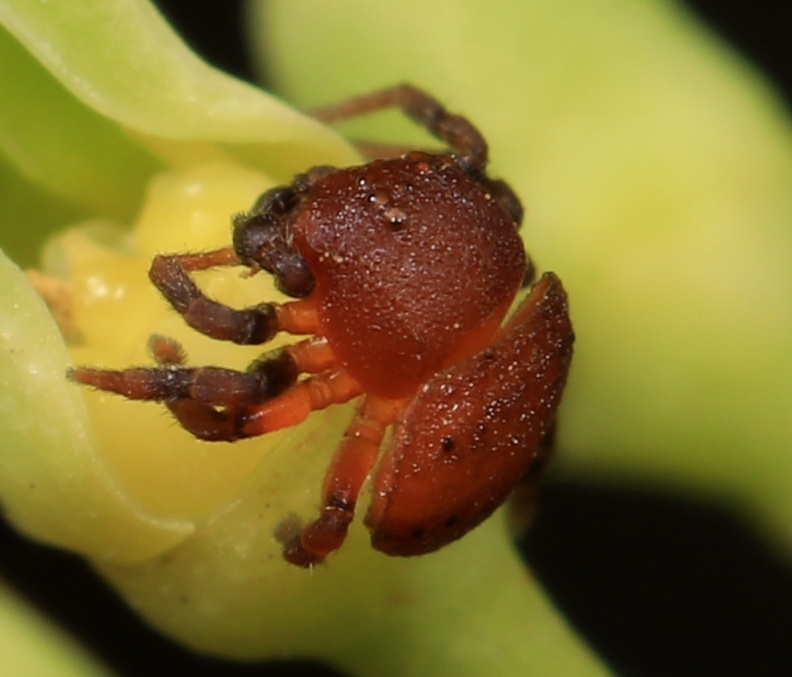
T. senegalensis from South Africa

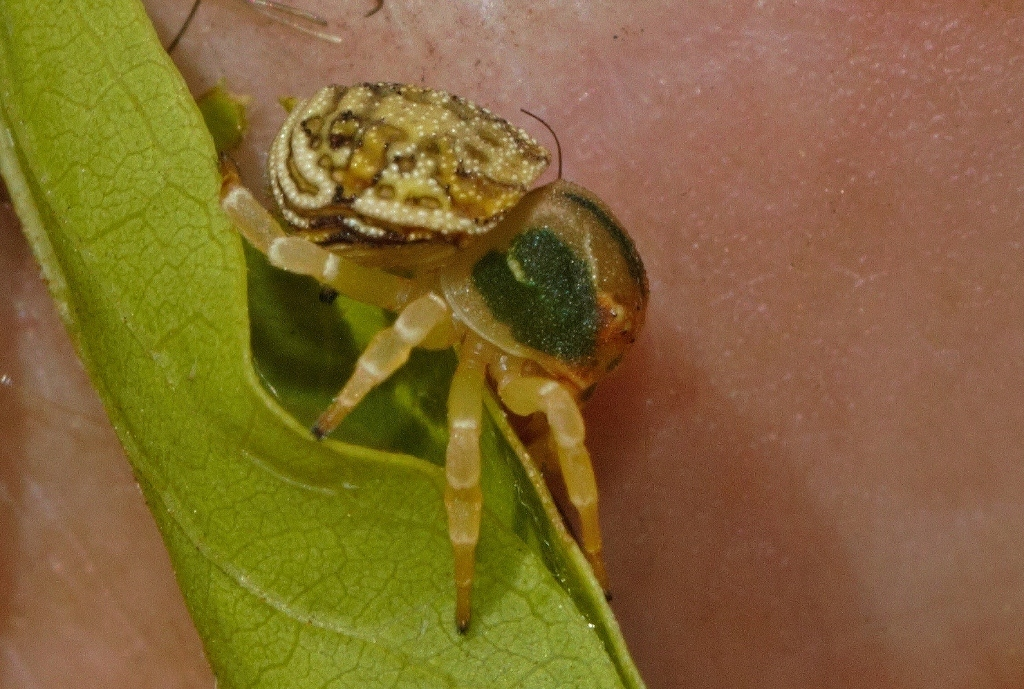
T. pupa from Zimbabwe

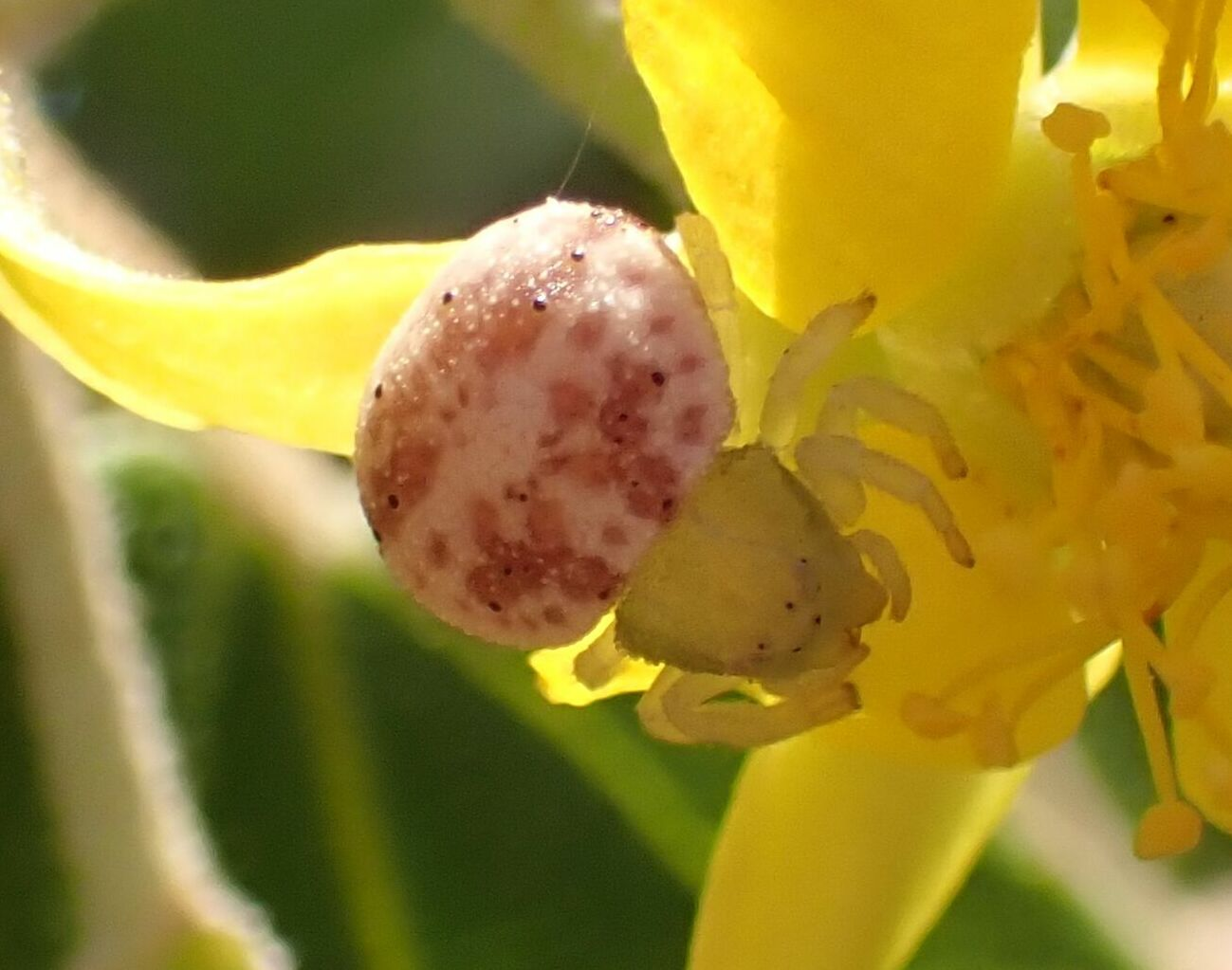
T. granulatus from South Africa

As of September 2025, Thomisops comprises the following species:

- Thomisops altus Tang & Li, 2010 – China
- Thomisops bullatus Simon, 1895 – Southern Africa
- Thomisops cretaceus Jézéquel, 1964 – Ivory Coast, Cameroon
- Thomisops granulatus Dippenaar-Schoeman, 1989 – South Africa
- Thomisops lesserti Millot, 1942 – West, Central, Southern Africa
- Thomisops melanopes Dippenaar-Schoeman, 1989 – South Africa
- Thomisops pupa Karsch, 1879 – Africa
- Thomisops sanmen Song, Zhang & Zheng, 1992 – China
- Thomisops senegalensis Millot, 1942 – West, Central, Southern Africa
- Thomisops sulcatus Simon, 1895 – Africa
