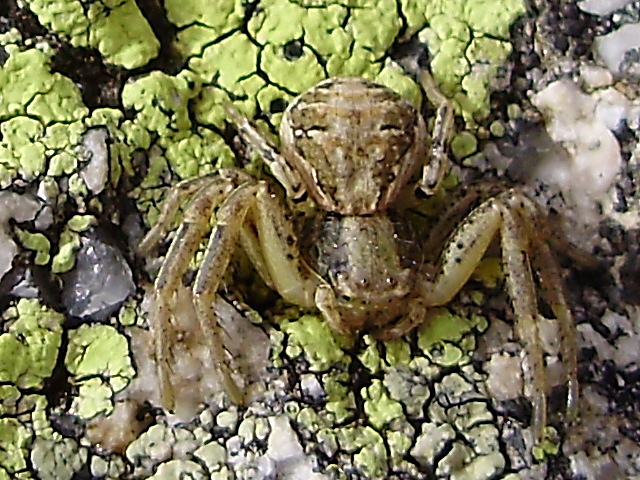
- S. striatipes
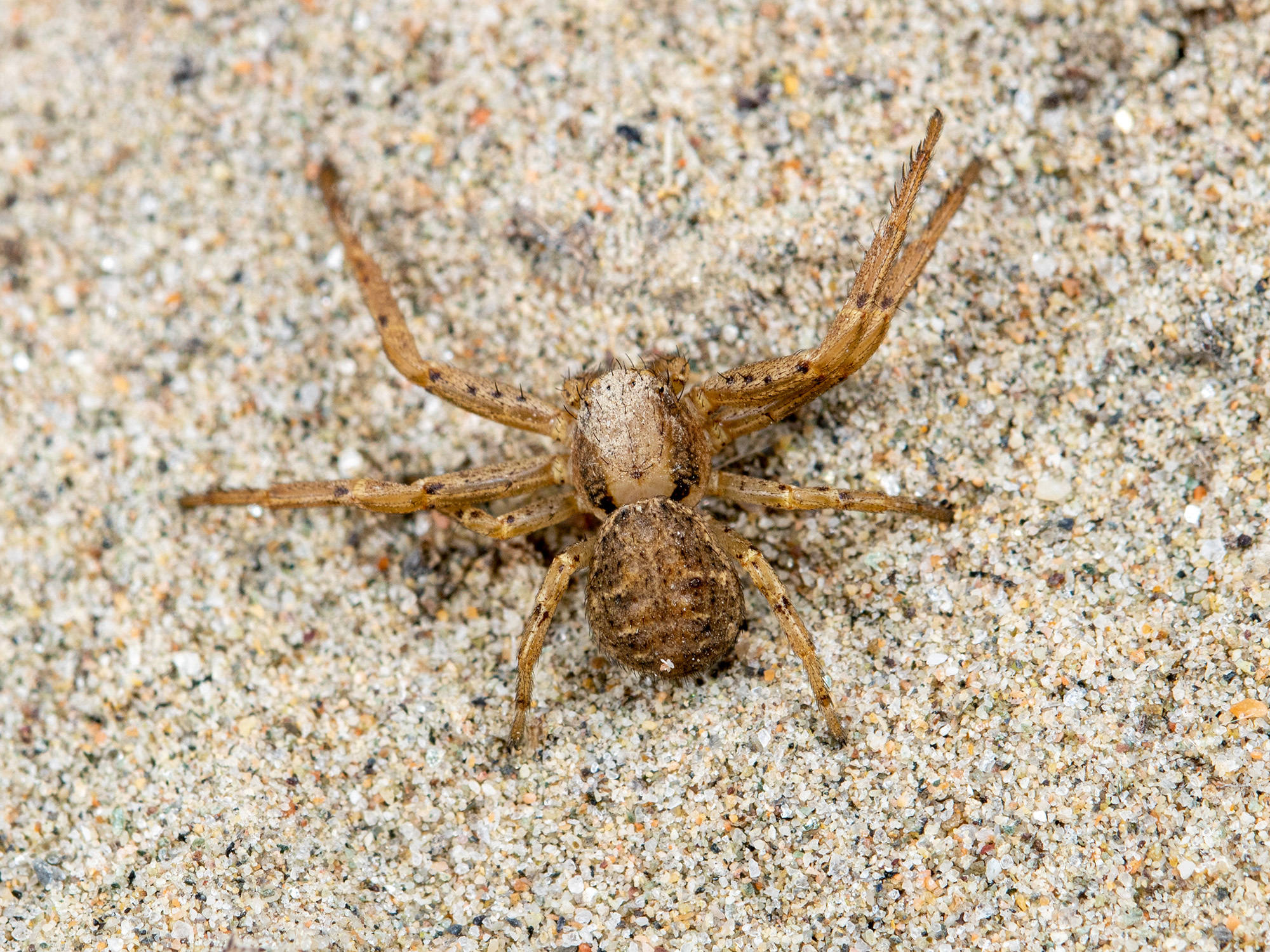
- S. mongolica

Scientific classification
- Kingdom: Animalia
- Phylum: Arthropoda
- Subphylum: Chelicerata
- Class: Arachnida
- Order: Araneae
- Infraorder: Araneomorphae
- Family: Thomisidae
- Genus: Spiracme; Menge, 1876

Type species
- Spiracme striata (L. Koch, 1870)

Species
- 10, see text

= Spiracme =

Genus of crab spiders

Spiracme is a genus of crab spiders erected by Anton Menge in 1876 to contain S. striata, transferred from Xysticus.

== Taxonomy ==
The exact relationship of these spiders and their closest relatives has been long debated, and many included species have been transferred to and from similar genera, namely Xysticus and Ozyptila. In 2019, Rainer Breitling conducted a DNA barcoding study and grouped similar genera based on the results:

- - Ozyptila
  - - Xysticus
    - - Psammitis
      - - Coriarachne
        - Bassaniana
        - Spiracme

== Species ==
As of January 2026, this genus includes ten species:

- Spiracme baltistana (Caporiacco, 1935) – Kazakhstan, Russia (Central Asia to Far East), Central Asia, Mongolia, China
- Spiracme dura (Sørensen, 1898) – Canada, United States, Greenland
- Spiracme keyserlingi (Bryant, 1930) – Canada, United States
- Spiracme lehtineni (Fomichev, Marusik & Koponen, 2014) – Russia (South Siberia)
- Spiracme lendli (Kulczyński, 1897) – Slovakia, Hungary, Serbia, Ukraine, Russia (Europe, Caucasus), Azerbaijan
- Spiracme nigromaculata (Keyserling, 1884) – Canada, United States
- Spiracme quadrata (Tang & Song, 1988) – China
- Spiracme striatipes (L. Koch, 1870) – Europe, Turkey, Caucasus, Russia, (Europe), Iran, China
- Spiracme triangulosa (Emerton, 1894) – Alaska, Canada, United States
- Spiracme vachoni (Schenkel, 1963) – Russia (Middle Siberia to Far East), Kazakhstan, Mongolia, Japan

== See also ==
- Xysticus
- List of Thomisidae genera
