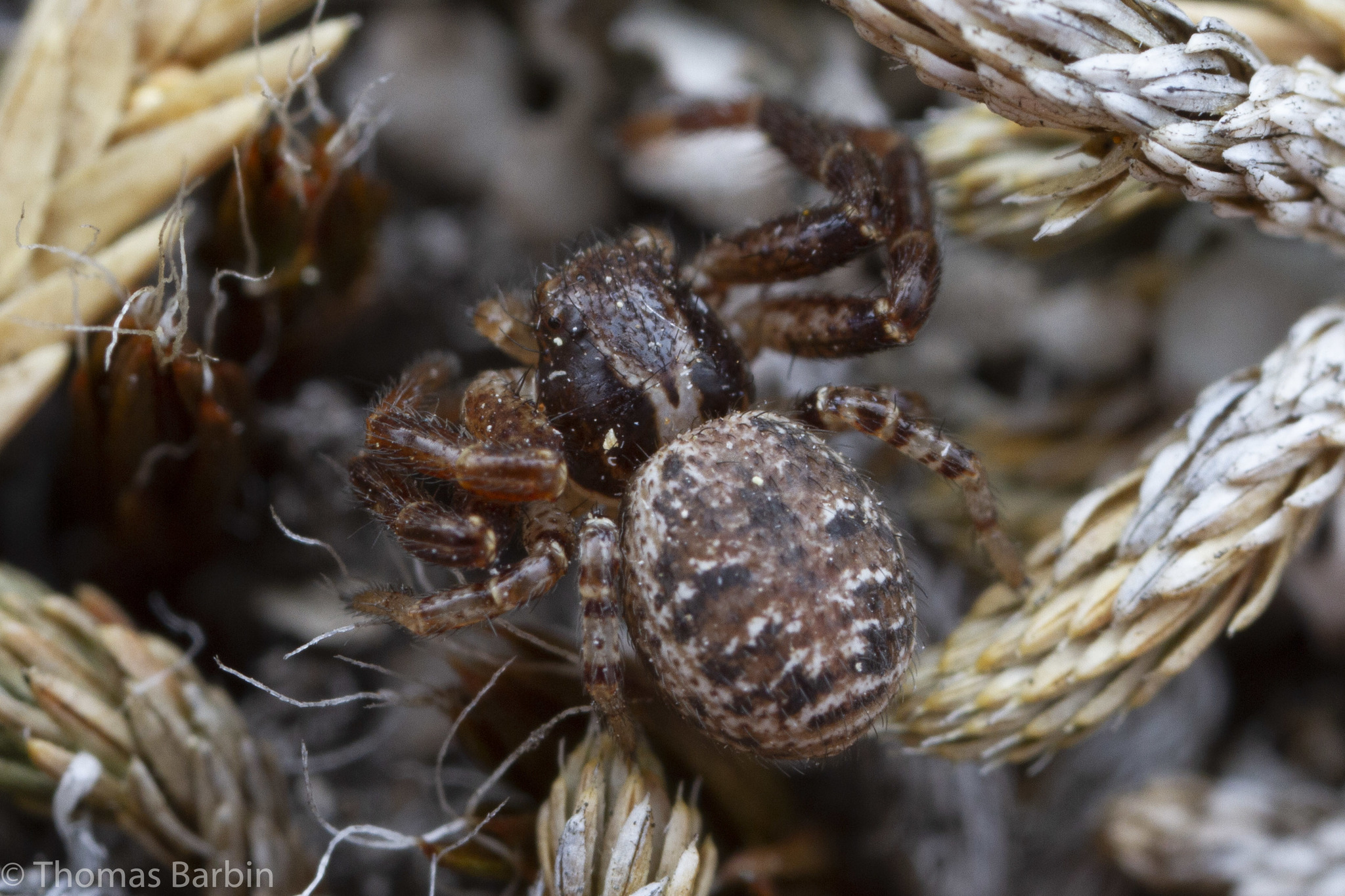

Scientific classification
- Domain: Eukaryota
- Kingdom: Animalia
- Phylum: Arthropoda
- Subphylum: Chelicerata
- Class: Arachnida
- Order: Araneae
- Infraorder: Araneomorphae
- Family: Thomisidae
- Genus: Spiracme
- Species: S. nigromaculatus

Binomial name
- Spiracme nigromaculatus Keyserling, 1884

= Spiracme nigromaculatus =

Species of spider

Spiracme nigromaculatus is a species of crab spider in the family Thomisidae. It is found in North America.
