= Ozyptila maculosa =

Scientific classification
- Domain: Eukaryota
- Kingdom: Animalia
- Phylum: Arthropoda
- Subphylum: Chelicerata
- Class: Arachnida
- Order: Araneae
- Infraorder: Araneomorphae
- Family: Thomisidae
- Genus: Ozyptila
- Species: O. maculosa

Binomial name
- Ozyptila maculosa Hull, 1948

Species of spider

Ozyptila maculosa is a crab spider species found in England.
