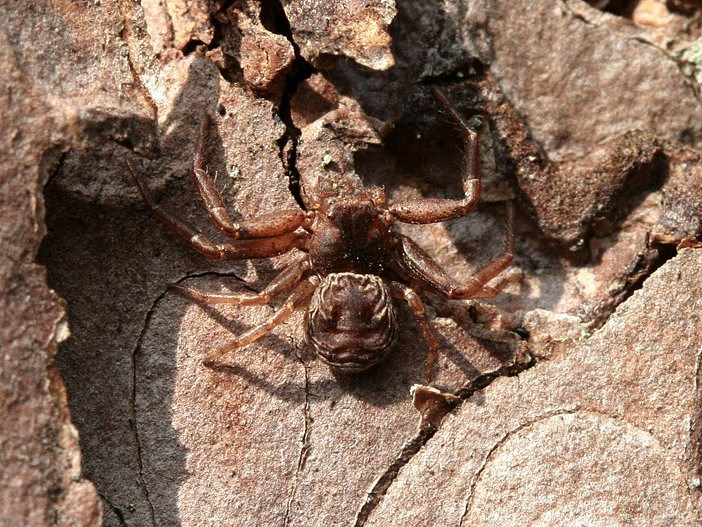
- C. depressa

Scientific classification
- Kingdom: Animalia
- Phylum: Arthropoda
- Subphylum: Chelicerata
- Class: Arachnida
- Order: Araneae
- Infraorder: Araneomorphae
- Family: Thomisidae
- Genus: Coriarachne; Thorell, 1870

Type species
- C. depressa (C. L. Koch, 1837)

Species
- 4, see text

= Coriarachne =

Genus of spiders

Coriarachne is a genus of crab spiders that was first described by Tamerlan Thorell in 1870. Over half of described species have been synonymized or moved to similar genera, including Bassaniana, Bassaniodes, and Pycnaxis.

They are found in boreal and temperate regions almost exclusively on tree bark, wooden fence posts and similar areas where they can take advantage of their natural camouflage. They are rather slow-moving and robust, with the crab-like appearance characteristic of the subfamily Thomisinae. Similar to others in its subfamily, they will wait to ambush their prey rather than actively pursuing it. Often these spiders will congregate under loose bark, leaf litter, or similar situations to spend the winter either in the adult or penultimate stage.

== Species ==
As of July 2020 it contains four species, found in Europe, Asia, Canada, and the United States:

- Coriarachne brunneipes Banks, 1893 – USA, Canada
- Coriarachne depressa (C. L. Koch, 1837) (type) – Europe, Turkey, Caucasus, Russia (Europe to Far East), Central Asia
- Coriarachne fulvipes (Karsch, 1879) – Korea, Japan
- Coriarachne melancholica Simon, 1880 – China

Formerly included:

- C. fienae Jocqué, 1993 (Transferred to Bassaniodes)
- C. floridana Banks, 1896 (Transferred to Bassaniana)
- C. nigrostriata Simon, 1886 (Transferred to Pycnaxis)
- C. utahensis (Gertsch, 1932) (Transferred to Bassaniana)
- C. versicolor Keyserling, 1880 (Transferred to Bassaniana)

In synonymy:

- C. nakina Gertsch, 1953 = Coriarachne brunneipes Banks, 1893
- C. potanini Schenkel, 1963 = Coriarachne melancholica Simon, 1880

Nomen dubium

- C. lenta (Walckenaer, 1837

== See also ==
- List of Thomisidae species
