= Bassaniana ora =

Scientific classification
- Domain: Eukaryota
- Kingdom: Animalia
- Phylum: Arthropoda
- Subphylum: Chelicerata
- Class: Arachnida
- Order: Araneae
- Infraorder: Araneomorphae
- Family: Thomisidae
- Genus: Bassaniana
- Species: B. ora

Binomial name
- Bassaniana ora Seo, 1992

Species of spider

Bassaniana ora is a species of spider in the genus Bassaniana, native to Korea, and was first described by Seo Bo Keun in 1992.
