= Ozyptila monroensis =

Scientific classification
- Domain: Eukaryota
- Kingdom: Animalia
- Phylum: Arthropoda
- Subphylum: Chelicerata
- Class: Arachnida
- Order: Araneae
- Infraorder: Araneomorphae
- Family: Thomisidae
- Genus: Ozyptila
- Species: O. monroensis

Binomial name
- Ozyptila monroensis Keyserling, 1884

Species of spider

Ozyptila monroensis is a species of crab spider in the family Thomisidae. It is found in the United States and Canada.
