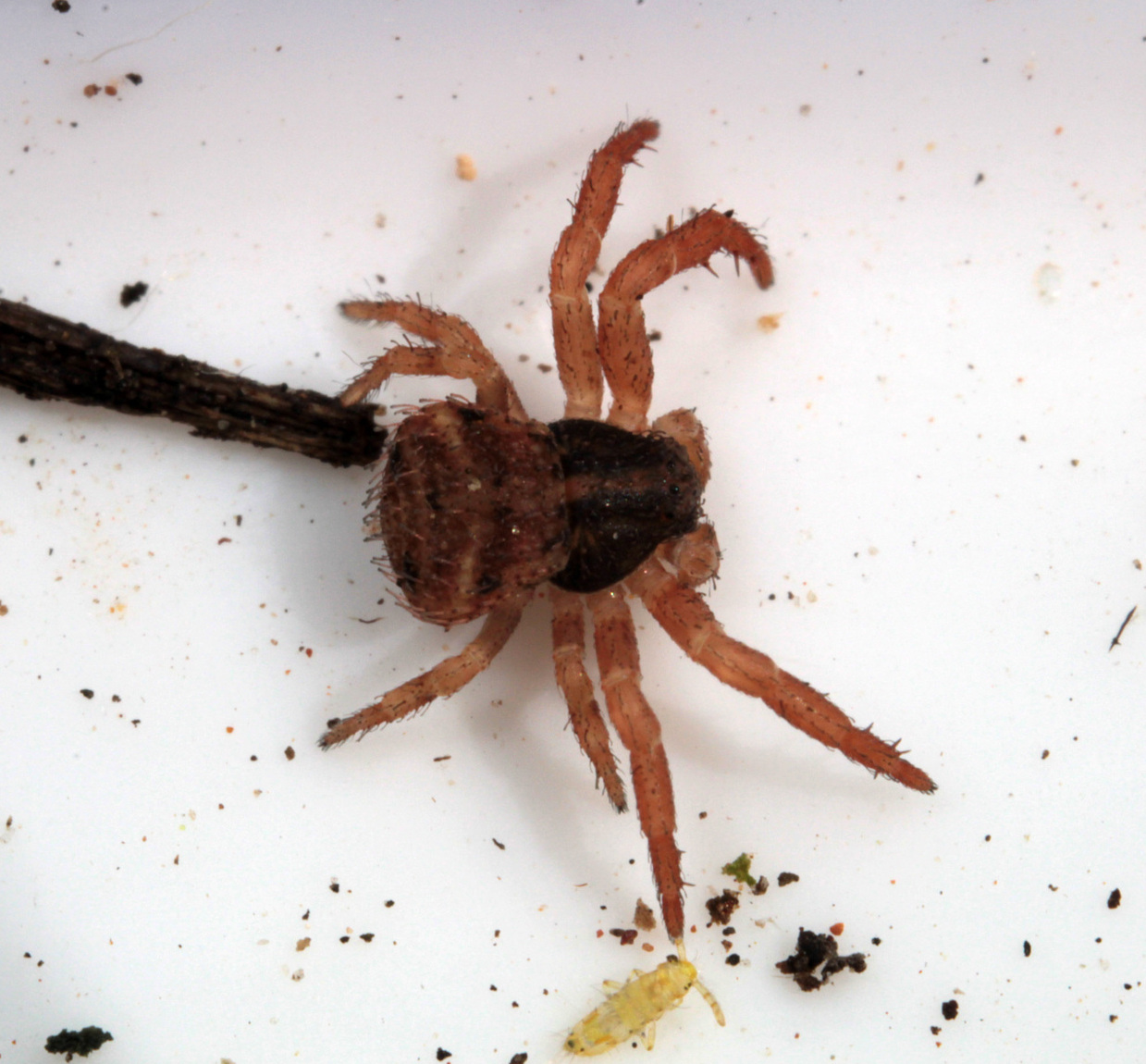

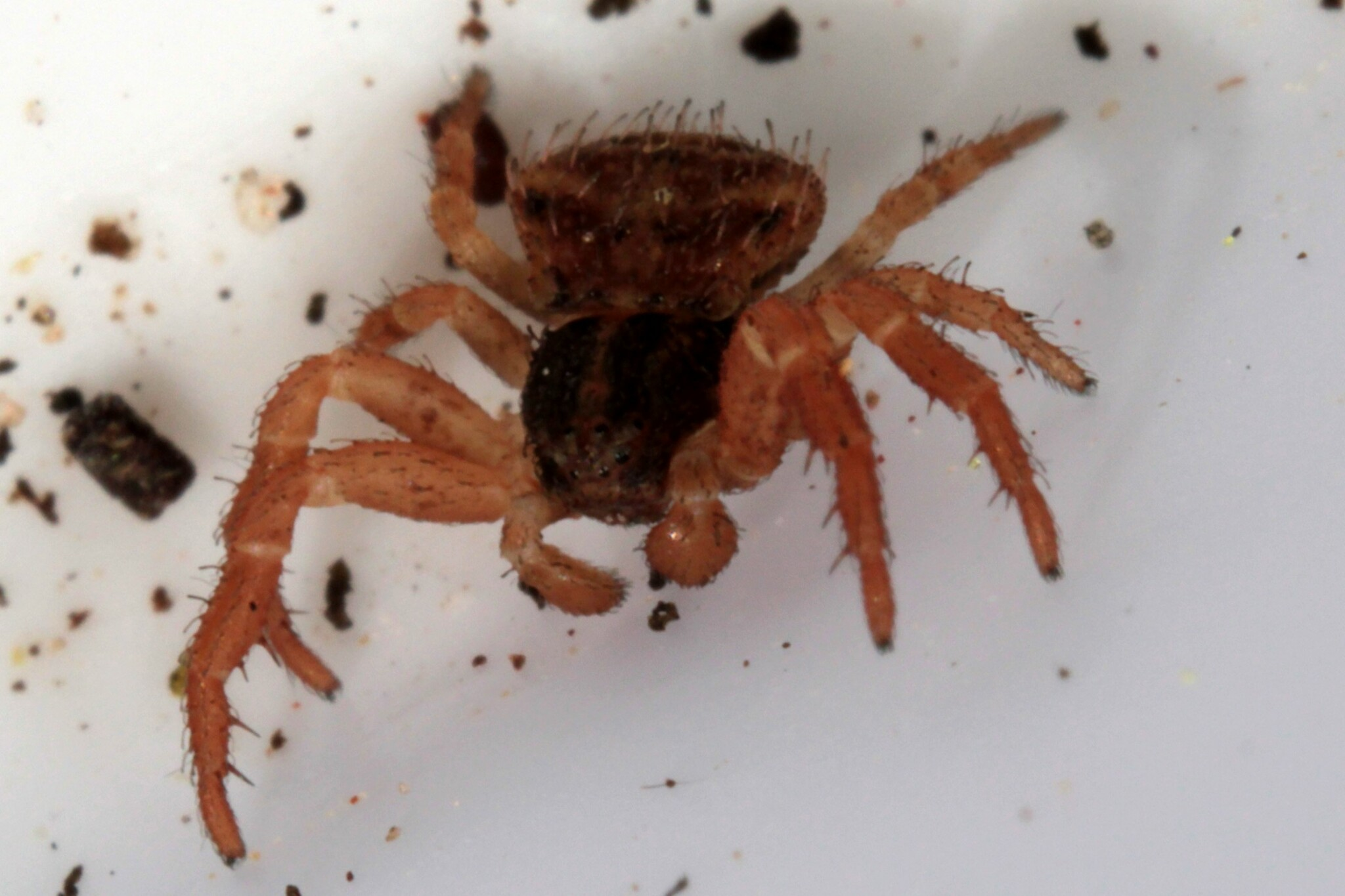

Scientific classification
- Kingdom: Animalia
- Phylum: Arthropoda
- Subphylum: Chelicerata
- Class: Arachnida
- Order: Araneae
- Infraorder: Araneomorphae
- Family: Thomisidae
- Genus: Ozyptila
- Species: O. caenosa

Binomial name
- Ozyptila caenosa Jézéquel, 1966

Synonyms
- Ozyptila lutulenta Jézéquel, 1964 (preoccupied)

= Ozyptila caenosa =

Species of spider

Ozyptila caenosa is a spider in the family Thomisidae. It is found in several African countries and Yemen.

== Distribution ==
Ozyptila caenosa is found in Ivory Coast, Kenya, South Africa, and Yemen.

In South Africa, it has been recorded from Eastern Cape, KwaZulu-Natal, Limpopo, North West, Northern Cape, and Western Cape provinces.

== Habitat and ecology ==
Ozyptila caenosa are free-living ground dwelling spiders usually sampled with pitfall traps.

They have been sampled from Fynbos, Forest, Savanna, and Thicket biomes at altitudes ranging from 15 to 1556 m. The species has also been sampled from maize fields.

== Conservation ==
Ozyptila caenosa is listed as Least Concern by the South African National Biodiversity Institute due to its wide geographical range. The species is protected in six reserves and faces no significant threats.

== Taxonomy ==
Ozyptila caenosa was described by Jézéquel in 1966 from the Ivory Coast. It is a replacement name for Ozyptila lutulenta Jézéquel, 1964, which was preoccupied.

The species has not been revised and is known from both sexes.
