= Ozyptila flava =

Scientific classification
- Kingdom: Animalia
- Phylum: Arthropoda
- Subphylum: Chelicerata
- Class: Arachnida
- Order: Araneae
- Infraorder: Araneomorphae
- Family: Thomisidae
- Genus: Ozyptila
- Species: O. flava

Binomial name
- Ozyptila flava Simon, 1875

Species of spider

Ozyptila flava is a crab spider species found in Spain. It is one of a number of species first described by Eugène Simon that do not appear to have been studied since.

== Description ==
Simon described only the female of Ozyptila flava. It has a light fawn coloured cephalothorax, with two marginal bands and two dorsal bands, all brown-red in colour, and with club-shaped black hairs. The abdomen is also light fawn, with several irregular brownish lines in the second half, and with short black hairs of two kinds. The legs are light fawn. The femur of the first leg has two short sub-acute spines, the femurs of the second and third legs have only one spine. The metatarsus of the first leg has a lateral spine.
