= Ozyptila secreta =

Scientific classification
- Kingdom: Animalia
- Phylum: Arthropoda
- Subphylum: Chelicerata
- Class: Arachnida
- Order: Araneae
- Infraorder: Araneomorphae
- Family: Thomisidae
- Genus: Ozyptila
- Species: O. secreta

Binomial name
- Ozyptila secreta Thaler, 1987

Species of spider

Ozyptila secreta is a crab spider species found in Switzerland and Italy.
