= Ozyptila perplexa =

Scientific classification
- Kingdom: Animalia
- Phylum: Arthropoda
- Subphylum: Chelicerata
- Class: Arachnida
- Order: Araneae
- Infraorder: Araneomorphae
- Family: Thomisidae
- Genus: Ozyptila
- Species: O. perplexa

Binomial name
- Ozyptila perplexa Simon, 1875

Species of spider

Ozyptila perplexa is a crab spider species found in Spain, France, and Algeria.
