= Ozyptila elegans =

Scientific classification
- Kingdom: Animalia
- Phylum: Arthropoda
- Subphylum: Chelicerata
- Class: Arachnida
- Order: Araneae
- Infraorder: Araneomorphae
- Family: Thomisidae
- Genus: Ozyptila
- Species: O. elegans

Binomial name
- Ozyptila elegans (Blackwall, 1870)

Species of spider

Ozyptila elegans is a species of crab spider in the genus Ozyptila. It can be found in Italy.
