= Ozyptila danubiana =

Scientific classification
- Kingdom: Animalia
- Phylum: Arthropoda
- Subphylum: Chelicerata
- Class: Arachnida
- Order: Araneae
- Infraorder: Araneomorphae
- Family: Thomisidae
- Genus: Ozyptila
- Species: O. danubiana

Binomial name
- Ozyptila danubiana Weiss, 1998

Species of spider

Ozyptila danubiana is a species of crab spiders found in Romania and Greece.
