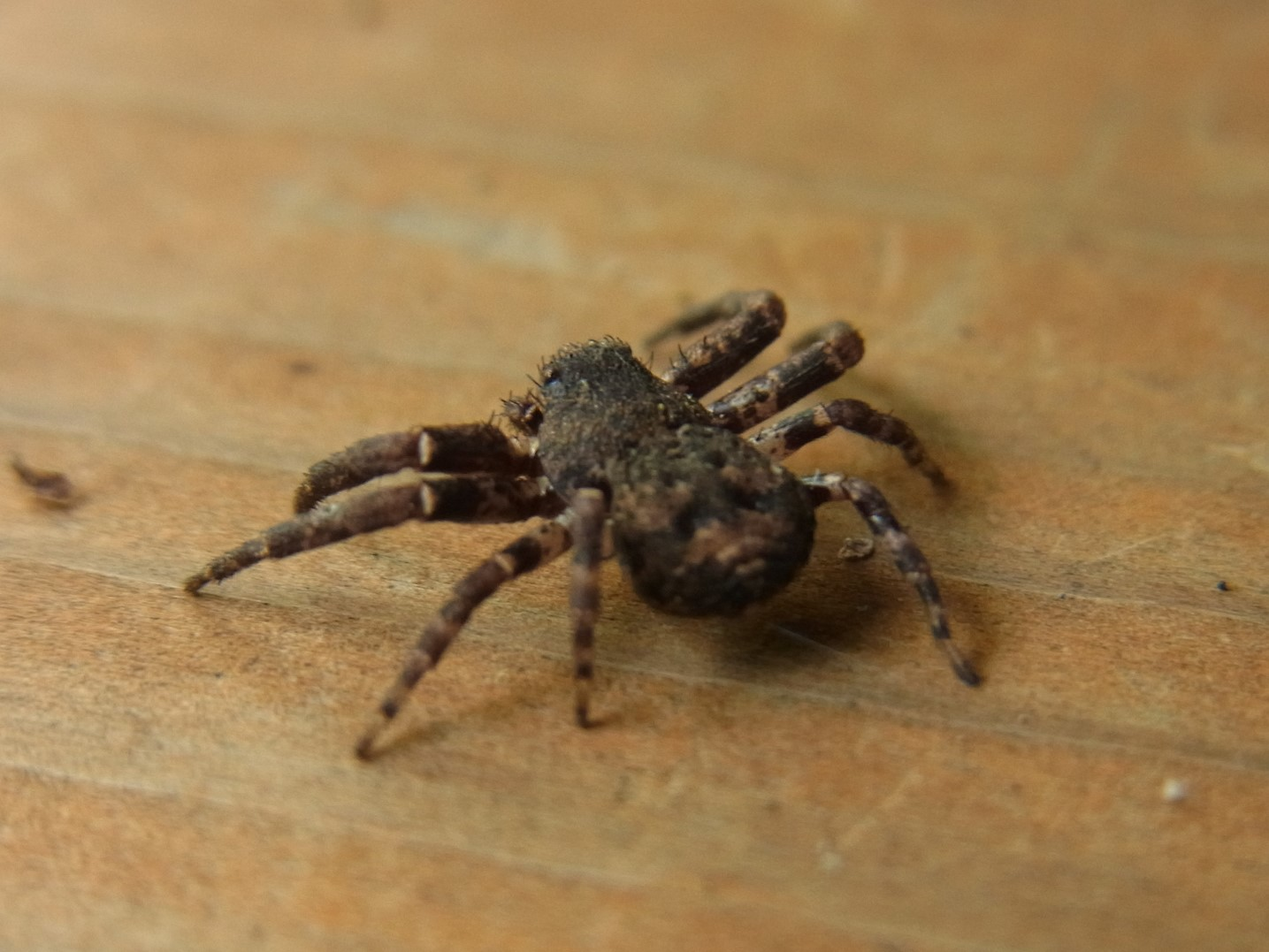

Scientific classification
- Domain: Eukaryota
- Kingdom: Animalia
- Phylum: Arthropoda
- Subphylum: Chelicerata
- Class: Arachnida
- Order: Araneae
- Infraorder: Araneomorphae
- Family: Thomisidae
- Genus: Bassaniana
- Species: B. decorata

Binomial name
- Bassaniana decorata (Karsch, 1879)

= Bassaniana decorata =

Species of spider

Bassaniana decorata is a species of spider in the family Thomisidae, found in Russia, China, Korea and Japan.
