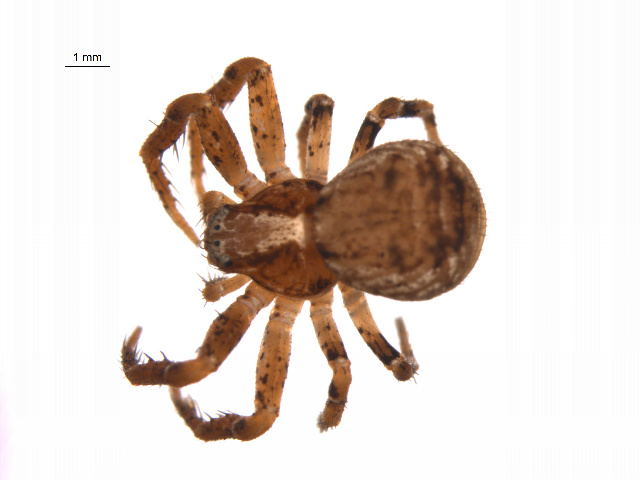
- O. pacifica, adult female
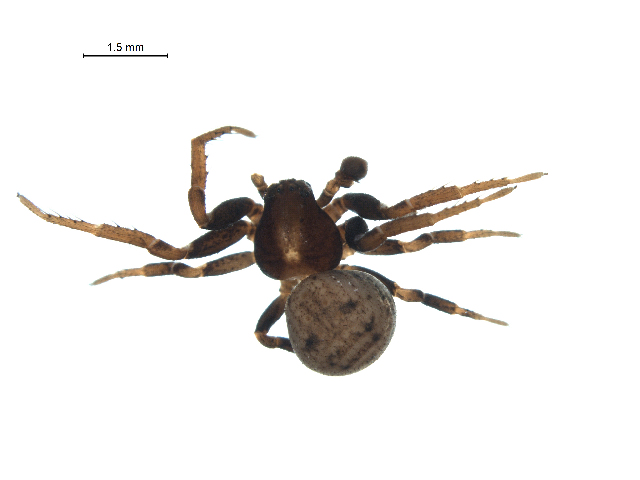
- O. pacifica, adult male

Scientific classification
- Kingdom: Animalia
- Phylum: Arthropoda
- Subphylum: Chelicerata
- Class: Arachnida
- Order: Araneae
- Infraorder: Araneomorphae
- Family: Thomisidae
- Genus: Ozyptila
- Species: O. pacifica

Binomial name
- Ozyptila pacifica Banks, 1895

= Ozyptila pacifica =

Species of spider

Ozyptila pacifica is a species of crab spider in the family Thomisidae. It is found in the United States and Canada.
