= Ozyptila umbraculorum =

Scientific classification
- Kingdom: Animalia
- Phylum: Arthropoda
- Subphylum: Chelicerata
- Class: Arachnida
- Order: Araneae
- Infraorder: Araneomorphae
- Family: Thomisidae
- Genus: Ozyptila
- Species: O. umbraculorum

Binomial name
- Ozyptila umbraculorum Simon, 1932

Species of spider

Ozyptila umbraculorum is a crab spider species found in Portugal, Spain and France.
