= Ozyptila bejarana =

Scientific classification
- Domain: Eukaryota
- Kingdom: Animalia
- Phylum: Arthropoda
- Subphylum: Chelicerata
- Class: Arachnida
- Order: Araneae
- Infraorder: Araneomorphae
- Family: Thomisidae
- Genus: Ozyptila
- Species: O. bejarana

Binomial name
- Ozyptila bejarana Urones, 1998

Species of spider

Ozyptila bejarana is a species of crab spiders found in Spain and France.
