= Ozyptila furcula =

Scientific classification
- Kingdom: Animalia
- Phylum: Arthropoda
- Subphylum: Chelicerata
- Class: Arachnida
- Order: Araneae
- Infraorder: Araneomorphae
- Family: Thomisidae
- Genus: Ozyptila
- Species: O. furcula

Binomial name
- Ozyptila furcula L. Koch, 1882

Species of spider

Ozyptila furcula is a crab spider species found in Spain, France and the Balearic Islands.
