= Pycnaxis guttata =

Scientific classification
- Kingdom: Animalia
- Phylum: Arthropoda
- Subphylum: Chelicerata
- Class: Arachnida
- Order: Araneae
- Infraorder: Araneomorphae
- Family: Thomisidae
- Genus: Pycnaxis
- Species: P. guttata

Binomial name
- Pycnaxis guttata Simon, 1895

Species of spider

Pycnaxis guttata is a species of crab spider in the family Thomisidae. It is widely found in Philippines.
