= Ozyptila westringi =

Scientific classification
- Kingdom: Animalia
- Phylum: Arthropoda
- Subphylum: Chelicerata
- Class: Arachnida
- Order: Araneae
- Infraorder: Araneomorphae
- Family: Thomisidae
- Genus: Ozyptila
- Species: O. westringi

Binomial name
- Ozyptila westringi (Thorell, 1873)

Species of spider

Ozyptila westringi is a crab spider species found in Sweden, Netherlands and Germany.
