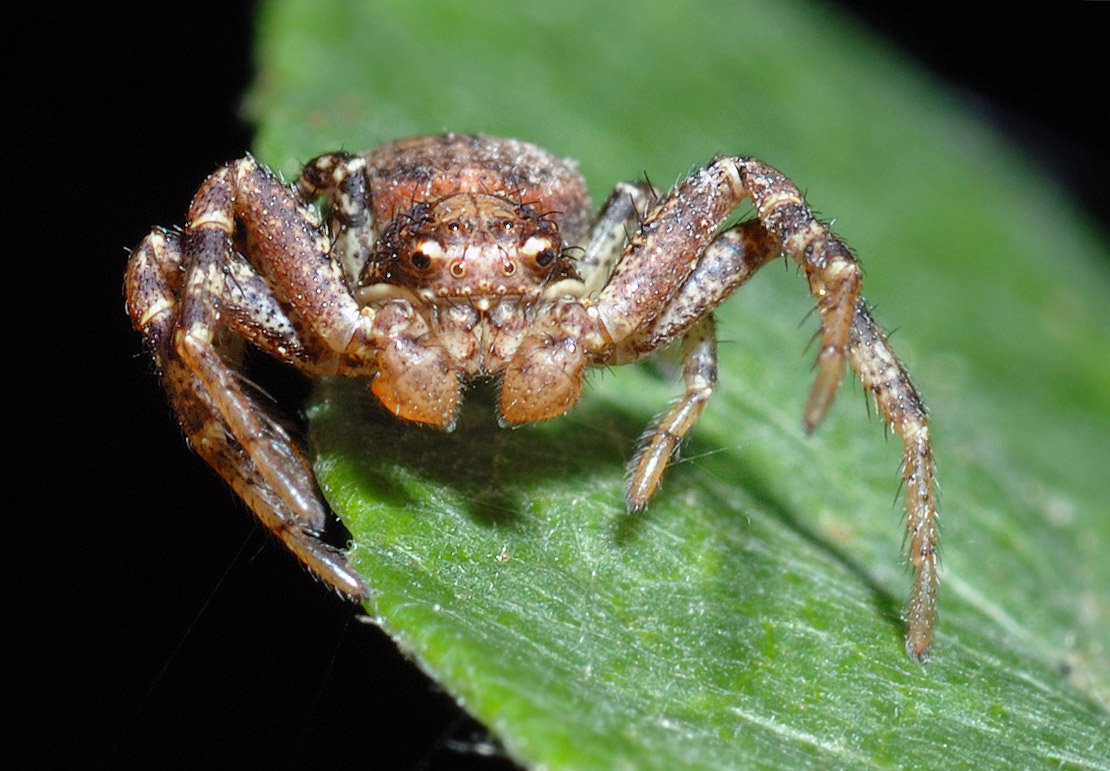

Scientific classification
- Domain: Eukaryota
- Kingdom: Animalia
- Phylum: Arthropoda
- Subphylum: Chelicerata
- Class: Arachnida
- Order: Araneae
- Infraorder: Araneomorphae
- Family: Thomisidae
- Genus: Ozyptila
- Species: O. praticola

Binomial name
- Ozyptila praticola (C. L. Koch, 1837)
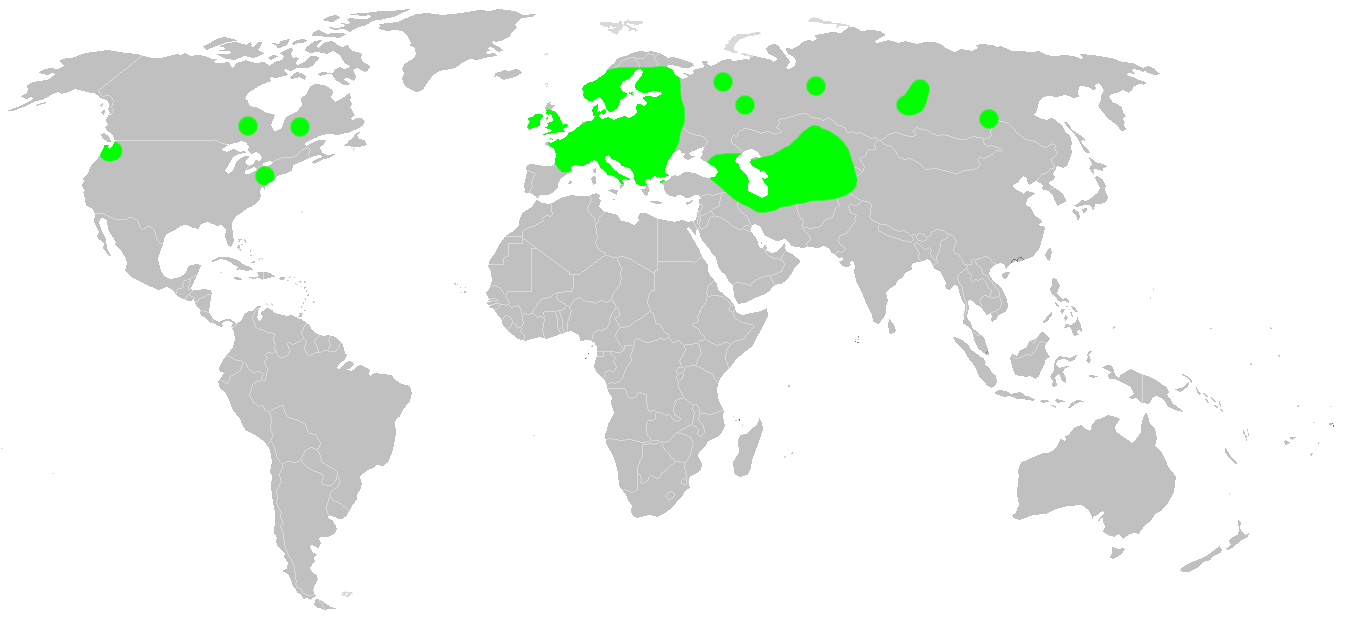

= Ozyptila praticola =

Species of spider

Ozyptila praticola is a species of crab spider found throughout Europe and the Middle East. Females reach up to 4 mm, males grow up to 3 mm. Both sexes are of a dark reddish brown. It hunts primarily in the undergrowth, but can also be found under the bark or on the lower branches of trees. This is also where the female deposits and guards its egg sac. Adults can be found most of the year.
