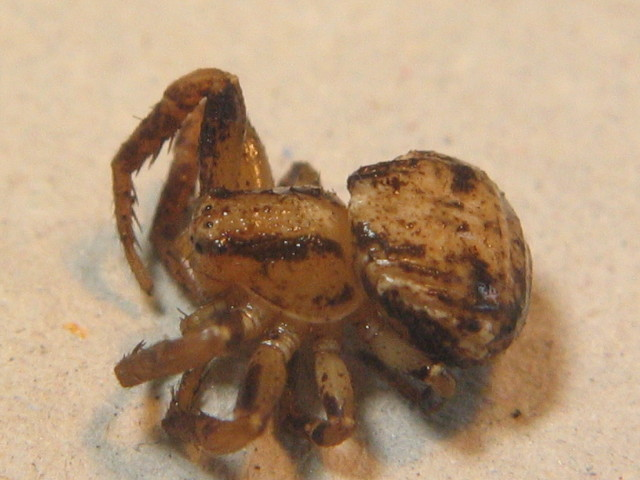

Scientific classification
- Kingdom: Animalia
- Phylum: Arthropoda
- Subphylum: Chelicerata
- Class: Arachnida
- Order: Araneae
- Infraorder: Araneomorphae
- Family: Thomisidae
- Genus: Ozyptila
- Species: O. trux

Binomial name
- Ozyptila trux (Blackwall, 1846)

Subspecies
- Ozyptila trux devittata Strand, 1901 — Norway

Synonyms
- Thomisus trux Blackwall, 1846; Ozyptila belma Gertsch, 1953

= Ozyptila trux =

Species of spider

Ozyptila trux, the yellow leaflitter crab spider, is a crab spider species with Palearctic distribution (introduced in Canada).

== Description ==
Body length female 4-5.5 mm; male 3.3–4 mm. The apophysis on the lateral tibia is approximately half the length of the cymbium, the median apophysis has 2 processes, pointing against towards other at right angles. The epigyne has a process in anterior epigynal region, wider than long. The prosoma is light brown, with 2-4 dark stripes along its length, the legs are uniformly light brown, as is the opisthosoma.

== Distribution ==
Ozyptil trux has a Palearctic distribution but has been introduced to Canada. In Great Britain it is widespread but is commoner in the north and west. It was known in Canada from a single female collected near Montreal which was designated as the holotype of a new species Oxyptila belma by Gertsch, subsequent comparisons with specimens of O. trux collected in England showed that the Canadian specimen was the same species. It may have been accidentally introduced to the site it was collected from and since it was not subsequently recorded may not have become established.

== Habitat and ecology ==
Ozyptil trux has a catholic habitat niche, being found in all types of wet and dry grassland, heath and woodland, from sea level to 350 m in southern Scotland. Adults may occur throughout the year although the spider may spend much of the season inactive or within the upper zone of the vegetation thus not being liable to capture. Data from the British Arachnological Society shows that adults have been recorded throughout the year, with males recorded from February to November, but peaking in the late spring and early summer.
