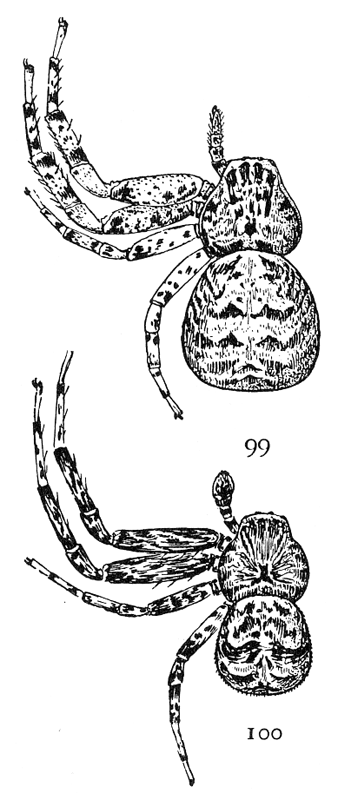

Scientific classification
- Domain: Eukaryota
- Kingdom: Animalia
- Phylum: Arthropoda
- Subphylum: Chelicerata
- Class: Arachnida
- Order: Araneae
- Infraorder: Araneomorphae
- Family: Thomisidae
- Genus: Bassaniana
- Species: B. versicolor

Binomial name
- Bassaniana versicolor (Keyserling, 1880)

= Bassaniana versicolor =

Species of spider

Bassaniana versicolor is a species of spiders in the genus Bassaniana, native to North America.

== Description ==
The species is brown, with white spots. Females are 6.75 millimetres (0.266 in) long, males 3.8–4.5 millimetres (0.15–0.18 in).
