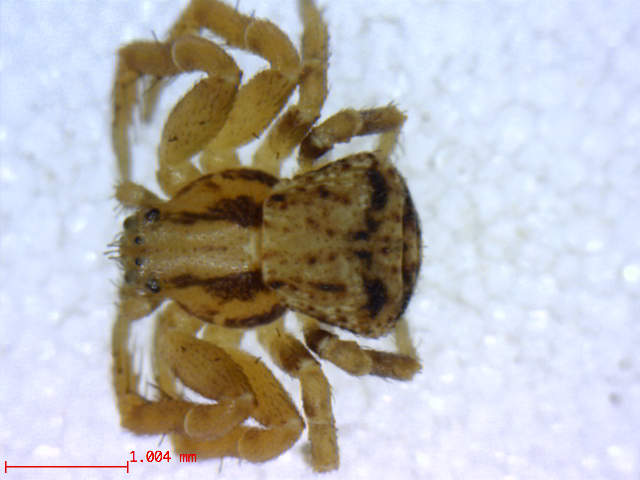
- O. distans from Canada

Scientific classification
- Domain: Eukaryota
- Kingdom: Animalia
- Phylum: Arthropoda
- Subphylum: Chelicerata
- Class: Arachnida
- Order: Araneae
- Infraorder: Araneomorphae
- Family: Thomisidae
- Genus: Ozyptila
- Species: O. distans

Binomial name
- Ozyptila distans Dondale & Redner, 1975

= Ozyptila distans =

Species of spider

Ozyptila distans is a species of crab spider in the family Thomisidae. It is found in the United States and Canada. It can commonly be found on coniferous logs.
