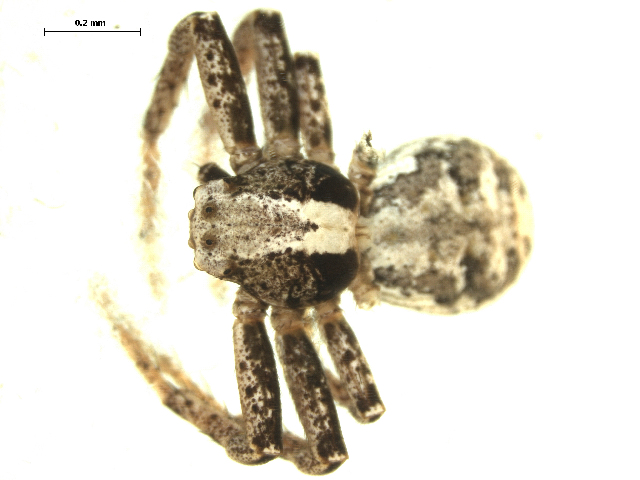

Scientific classification
- Domain: Eukaryota
- Kingdom: Animalia
- Phylum: Arthropoda
- Subphylum: Chelicerata
- Class: Arachnida
- Order: Araneae
- Infraorder: Araneomorphae
- Family: Thomisidae
- Genus: Psammitis
- Species: P. labradorensis

Binomial name
- Psammitis labradorensis (Keyserling, 1887)

= Psammitis labradorensis =

Species of spider

Psammitis labradorensis is a species of crab spider in the family Thomisidae. It is found in North America and Greenland.
