= Ozyptila confluens =

Scientific classification
- Domain: Eukaryota
- Kingdom: Animalia
- Phylum: Arthropoda
- Subphylum: Chelicerata
- Class: Arachnida
- Order: Araneae
- Infraorder: Araneomorphae
- Family: Thomisidae
- Genus: Ozyptila
- Species: O. confluens

Binomial name
- Ozyptila confluens (C. L. Koch, 1845)

Species of spider

Ozyptila confluens is a crab spider species found in Southern Europe and Syria.
