= Ozyptila ladina =

Scientific classification
- Kingdom: Animalia
- Phylum: Arthropoda
- Subphylum: Chelicerata
- Class: Arachnida
- Order: Araneae
- Infraorder: Araneomorphae
- Family: Thomisidae
- Genus: Ozyptila
- Species: O. ladina

Binomial name
- Ozyptila ladina Thaler & Zingerle, 1998

Species of spider

Ozyptila ladina is a species of crab spiders found in Italy.
