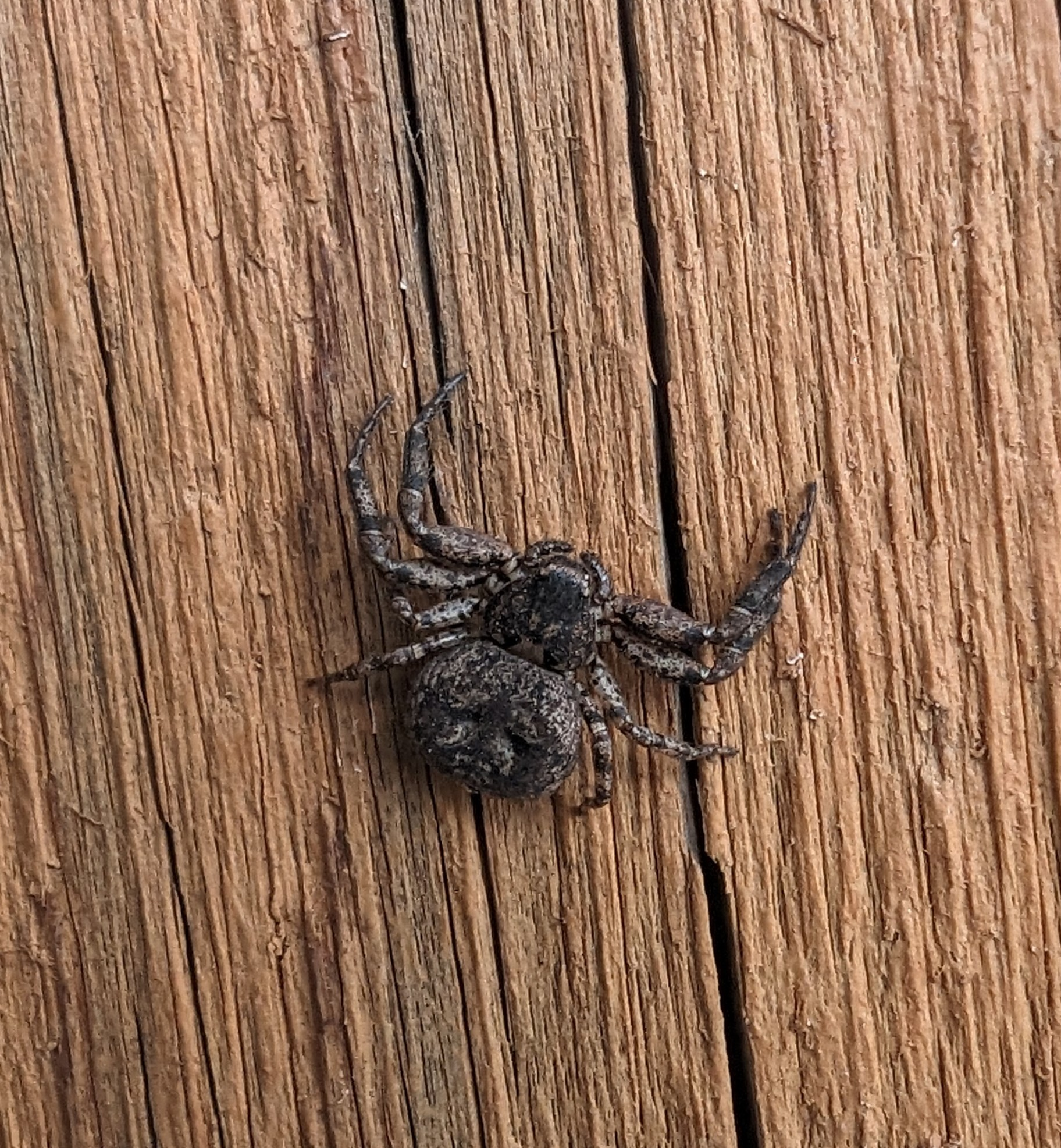

Scientific classification
- Domain: Eukaryota
- Kingdom: Animalia
- Phylum: Arthropoda
- Subphylum: Chelicerata
- Class: Arachnida
- Order: Araneae
- Infraorder: Araneomorphae
- Family: Thomisidae
- Genus: Bassaniana
- Species: B. floridana

Binomial name
- Bassaniana floridana (Banks, 1896)

= Bassaniana floridana =

Species of spider

Bassaniana floridana is a species of spider in the genus Bassaniana found in the U.S.

== Description ==
Anterior eye row slightly recurved. Anterior legs of the male are slightly mottled.
