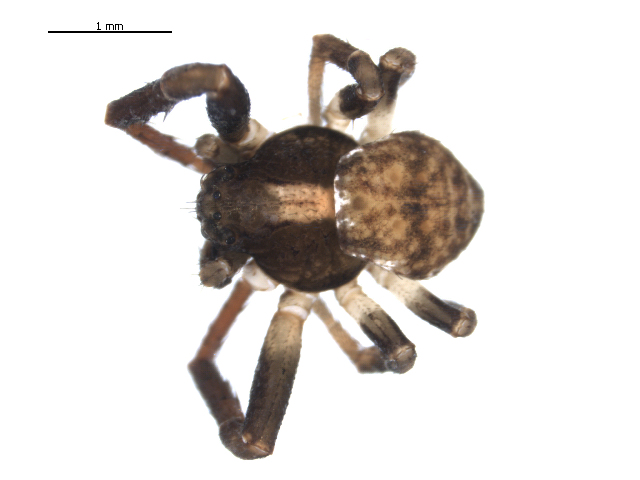
- O. s. canadensis from Alberta

Scientific classification
- Domain: Eukaryota
- Kingdom: Animalia
- Phylum: Arthropoda
- Subphylum: Chelicerata
- Class: Arachnida
- Order: Araneae
- Infraorder: Araneomorphae
- Family: Thomisidae
- Genus: Ozyptila
- Species: O. sincera

Binomial name
- Ozyptila sincera Kulczynski, 1926

= Ozyptila sincera =

Species of spider

Ozyptila sincera is a species of crab spider in the family Thomisidae. It is found in Russia (European, Far East), Korea, and Japan.

== Subspecies ==
These three subspecies belong to the species Ozyptila sincera:

- (Ozyptila sincera sincera) Kulczynski, 1926
- Ozyptila sincera canadensis Dondale & Redner, 1975
- Ozyptila sincera oraria Dondale & Redner, 1975
