= Bassaniana utahensis =

- Beneath a picnic table in British Columbia, Canada

Conservation status
- Secure (NatureServe)

Scientific classification
- Kingdom: Animalia
- Phylum: Arthropoda
- Subphylum: Chelicerata
- Class: Arachnida
- Order: Araneae
- Infraorder: Araneomorphae
- Family: Thomisidae
- Genus: Bassaniana
- Species: B. utahensis

Binomial name
- Bassaniana utahensis (Gertsch, 1932)

Species of spider

Bassaniana utahensis is a species of spider of the genus Bassaniana, the bark crab spiders. It is native to Canada and the United States.
