= Coriarachne brunneipes =

Scientific classification
- Domain: Eukaryota
- Kingdom: Animalia
- Phylum: Arthropoda
- Subphylum: Chelicerata
- Class: Arachnida
- Order: Araneae
- Infraorder: Araneomorphae
- Family: Thomisidae
- Genus: Coriarachne
- Species: C. brunneipes

Binomial name
- Coriarachne brunneipes Banks, 1893

Species of spider

Coriarachne brunneipes is a species of crab spider in the family Thomisidae. It is found in the United States and Canada. It is commonly found living beneath tree bark. Females are known to guard their egg sac(s) until the spiderlings hatch.
