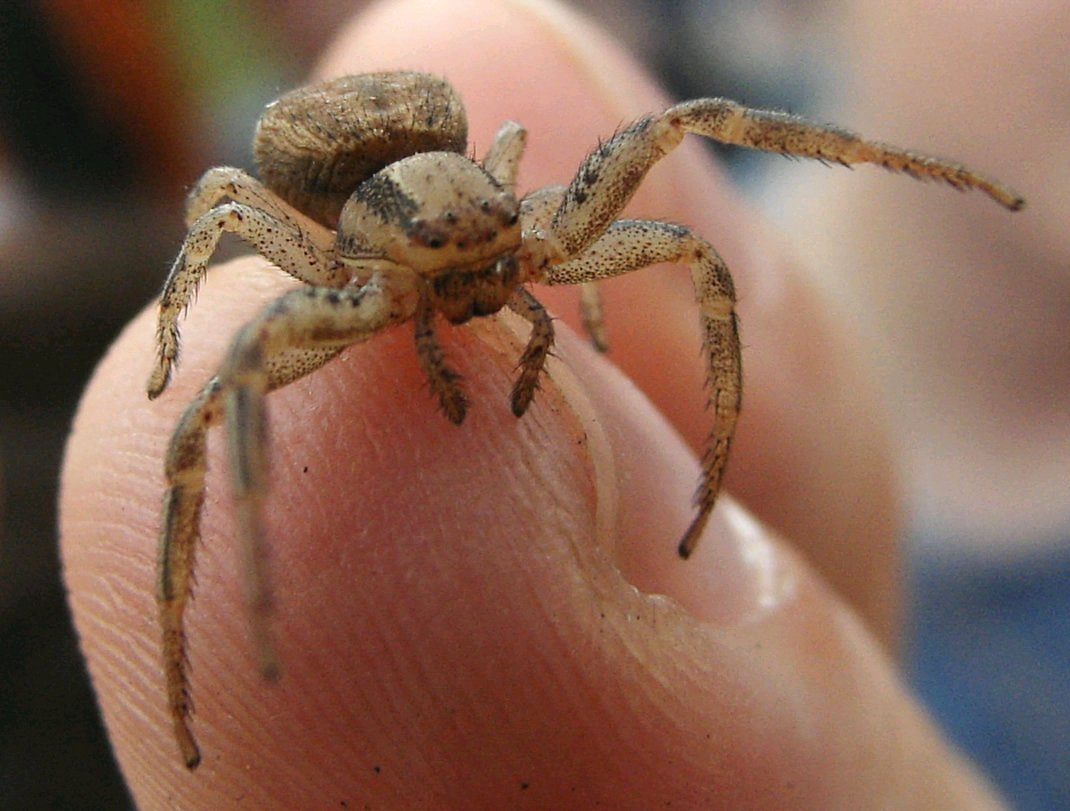

Scientific classification
- Kingdom: Animalia
- Phylum: Arthropoda
- Subphylum: Chelicerata
- Class: Arachnida
- Order: Araneae
- Infraorder: Araneomorphae
- Family: Thomisidae
- Genus: Ozyptila
- Species: O. atomaria

Binomial name
- Ozyptila atomaria (Panzer, 1801)

= Ozyptila atomaria =

Species of spider

Ozyptila atomaria is a species of crab spider with palearctic distribution. It is very common on moist meadows of central Europe.

Females reach up to 6 mm, males grow up to 4 mm, making it the biggest Ozyptila species. Both sexes are similar, generally yellowish brown, with two black lines running along the sides of the cephalothorax. Adults can be found at all times.
