= Ozyptila salustri =

Scientific classification
- Kingdom: Animalia
- Phylum: Arthropoda
- Subphylum: Chelicerata
- Class: Arachnida
- Order: Araneae
- Infraorder: Araneomorphae
- Family: Thomisidae
- Genus: Ozyptila
- Species: O. salustri

Binomial name
- Ozyptila salustri Wunderlich, 2011

Species of spider

Ozyptila salustri is a crab spider species found in Tuscany, Italy.
