= Ozyptila gertschi =

Scientific classification
- Domain: Eukaryota
- Kingdom: Animalia
- Phylum: Arthropoda
- Subphylum: Chelicerata
- Class: Arachnida
- Order: Araneae
- Infraorder: Araneomorphae
- Family: Thomisidae
- Genus: Ozyptila
- Species: O. gertschi

Binomial name
- Ozyptila gertschi Kurata, 1944

Species of spider

Ozyptila gertschi is a crab spider species with Holarctic distribution. It is considered new to the fauna of Latvia since 2009.
