= Psammitis =

Scientific classification
- Kingdom: Animalia
- Phylum: Arthropoda
- Subphylum: Chelicerata
- Class: Arachnida
- Order: Araneae
- Infraorder: Araneomorphae
- Family: Thomisidae
- Genus: Psammitis; Menge, 1876

Type species
- P. sabulosus (Hahn, 1832)

Species
- 32, see text

Genus of spiders

Psammitis is a genus of crab spiders first described by Anton Menge in 1876.

== Species ==
As of April 2019 it contains thirty-two species:

- Psammitis abramovi (Marusik & Logunov, 1995) — Turkey, Iran, Tajikistan
- Psammitis albidus (Grese, 1909) — Northern Europe, Russia (Europe, Siberia, Far East)
- Psammitis bonneti (Denis, 1938) — France, Italy, Austria, Bulgaria, Russia (Urals to South Siberia), Kazakhstan
- Psammitis courti (Marusik & Omelko, 2014) — China
- Psammitis daisetsuzanus (Ono, 1988) — Japan
- Psammitis deichmanni (Sørensen, 1898) — Canada, USA (Alaska), Greenland
- Psammitis demirsoyi (Demir, Topçu & Türkes, 2006) — Turkey
- Psammitis gobiensis (Marusik & Logunov, 2002) — Russia (South Siberia), Mongolia, China
- Psammitis labradorensis (Keyserling, 1887) — North America, Greenland
- Psammitis laticeps (Bryant, 1933) — USA, Cuba
- Psammitis lindbergi (Roewer, 1962) — Afghanistan
- Psammitis minor (Charitonov, 1946) — Central Asia
- Psammitis nenilini (Marusik, 1989) — Russia (Middle and South Siberia), Mongolia, China
- Psammitis nepalhimalaicus (Ono, 1978) — Nepal
- Psammitis nevadensis (Keyserling, 1880) — USA
- Psammitis ninnii (Thorell, 1872) — Europe, Turkey, Caucasus, Russia (Europe to South Siberia), Central Asia
  - Psammitis n. fusciventris (Crome, 1965) — Eastern Europe to Mongolia
- Psammitis novokhatskyii (Fomichev, 2015) — Russia (Altai)
- Psammitis potamon (Ono, 1978) — Nepal
- Psammitis rugosus (Buckle & Redner, 1964) — Russia (Middle Siberia to Far East), Canada, USA
- Psammitis sabulosus (Hahn, 1832) — Europe, North Africa, Turkey, Caucasus, Russia (Europe to Middle Siberia), Afghanistan
  - Psammitis s. occidentalis (Kulczyński, 1916) — France
- Psammitis secedens (L. Koch, 1876) — Alps (Austria, Italy), Macedonia
- Psammitis seserlig (Logunov & Marusik, 1994) — Russia (South Siberia, Far East), Mongolia
- Psammitis setiger (O. Pickard-Cambridge, 1885) — Pakistan, India
- Psammitis sibiricus (Kulczyński, 1908) — Russia (Middle Siberia to Far East), China
- Psammitis simplicipalpatus (Ono, 1978) — Nepal, Bhutan
- Psammitis torsivus (Tang & Song, 1988) — China
- Psammitis tyshchenkoi (Marusik & Logunov, 1995) — Central Asia
- Psammitis wuae (Song & Zhu, 1995) — China
- Psammitis xysticiformis (Caporiacco, 1935) — Central Asia, China
- Psammitis zonshteini (Marusik, 1989) — Kyrgyzstan, Tajikistan
