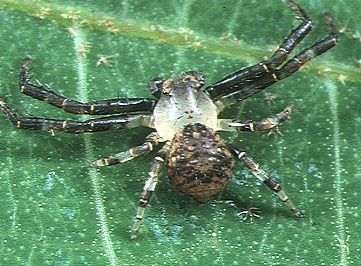
- T. truciformis, male
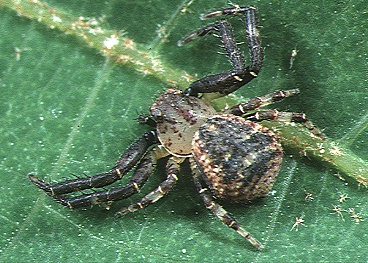
- T. truciformis, female

Scientific classification
- Kingdom: Animalia
- Phylum: Arthropoda
- Subphylum: Chelicerata
- Class: Arachnida
- Order: Araneae
- Infraorder: Araneomorphae
- Family: Thomisidae
- Genus: Pycnaxis; Simon, 1895

Type species
- Pycnaxis guttata

Species
- 7, see text.

= Pycnaxis =

Genus of spiders

Pycnaxis is a genus of Asian crab spiders first described by Eugène Simon in 1895. They are endemic to eastern Asia from China to the Philippines.

== Species ==
As of 2017 it contains seven species:

- Pycnaxis guttata Simon, 1895 - Philippines
- Pycnaxis krakatauensis (Bristowe, 1931) - Krakatau
- Pycnaxis lamellaris (Tang & Li, 2010) - China
- Pycnaxis nigrostriata (Simon, 1886) - Vietnam
- Pycnaxis onoi (Zhang, Zhu & Tso, 2006) - Taiwan
- Pycnaxis truciformis (Bösenberg & Strand, 1906) - China, Korea, Taiwan, Japan
- Pycnaxis tumida (Tang & Li, 2010) - China
