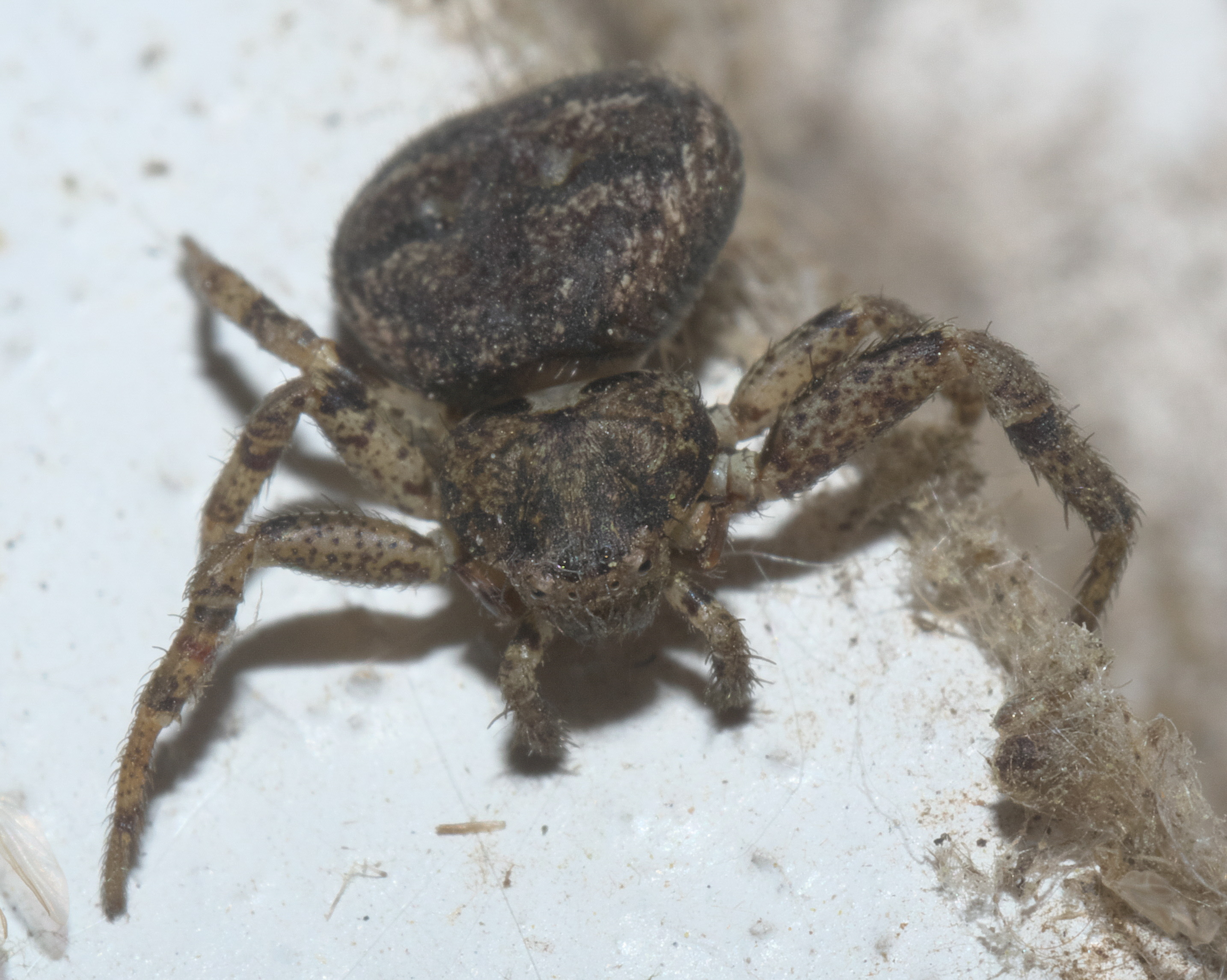
- B. versicolor

Scientific classification
- Kingdom: Animalia
- Phylum: Arthropoda
- Subphylum: Chelicerata
- Class: Arachnida
- Order: Araneae
- Infraorder: Araneomorphae
- Family: Thomisidae
- Genus: Bassaniana; Strand, 1928

Type species
- B. versicolor (Keyserling, 1880)

Species
- 7, see text

= Bassaniana =

Genus of spiders

Bassaniana, commonly called bark crab spiders, is a widespread genus of crab spiders that was first described by Embrik Strand in 1928.

== Species ==
As of November 2021 it contains seven species, found in Europe, Asia, and North America:

- Bassaniana baudueri (Simon, 1877) – Portugal, France, Germany, Austria, Slovakia, Hungary, Romania
- Bassaniana birudis Im, Kim & Lee, 2021 – Korea
- Bassaniana decorata (Karsch, 1879) – Russia (Far East), China, Korea, Japan
- Bassaniana floridana (Banks, 1896) – USA
- Bassaniana ora Seo, 1992 – Korea
- Bassaniana utahensis (Gertsch, 1932) – USA, Canada
- Bassaniana versicolor (Keyserling, 1880) (type) – North America

In synonymy:

- B. aemula ) = Bassaniana versicolor (Keyserling, 1880)
- B. albomaculatus (Kulczyński, 1891) = Bassaniana baudueri (Simon, 1877)
- B. japonicus (Simon, 1886) = Bassaniana decorata (Karsch, 1879)
- B. pichoni (Schenkel, 1963) = Bassaniana decorata (Karsch, 1879)
- B. typica (Kishida, 1913) = Bassaniana decorata (Karsch, 1879)

== See also ==
- List of Thomisidae species
