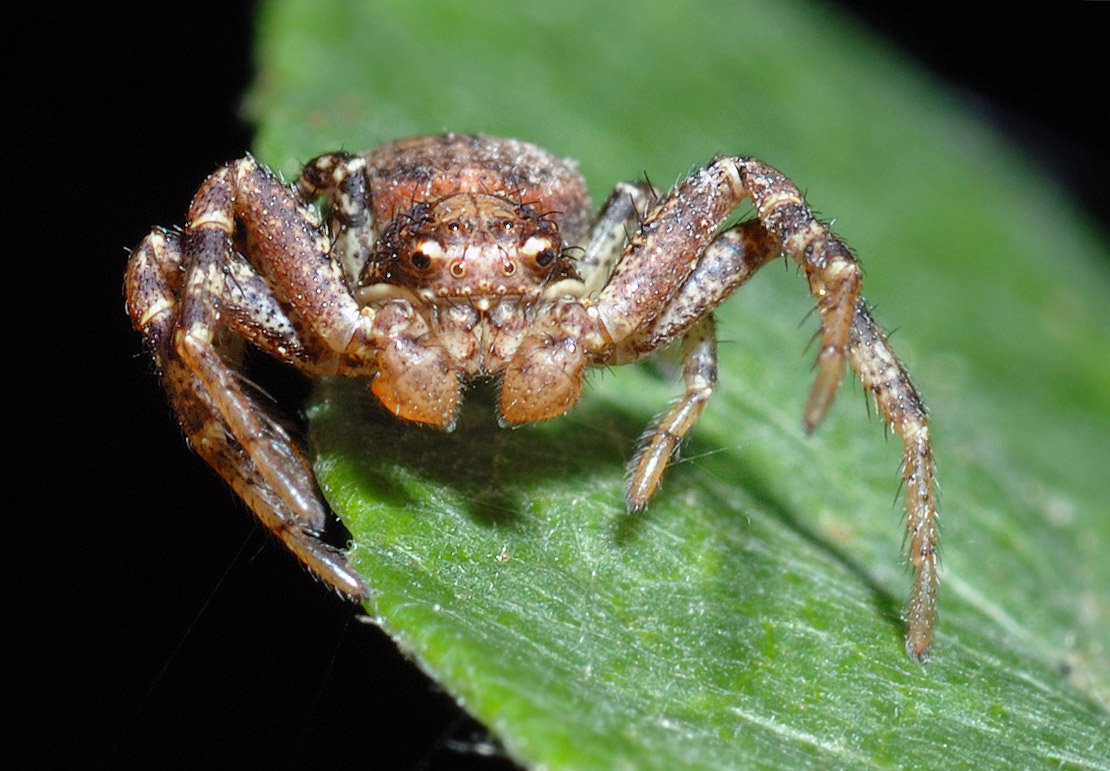
- Ozyptila praticola

Scientific classification
- Kingdom: Animalia
- Phylum: Arthropoda
- Subphylum: Chelicerata
- Class: Arachnida
- Order: Araneae
- Infraorder: Araneomorphae
- Family: Thomisidae
- Genus: Ozyptila; Simon, 1864

Type species
- O. claveata (Walckenaer, 1837)

Species
- 103, see text

= Ozyptila =

Genus of spiders

Ozyptila is a genus of crab spiders that was first described by Eugène Louis Simon in 1864. It has been misspelled as "Oxyptila" in multiple accounts.

== Distribution ==
Members of this genus are found in Africa, Europe, North America, and Asia.

== Description ==
Ozyptila spiders have a pear-shaped carapace that is rather high and slightly convex. The carapace is anteriorly obtuse with a vertical clypeus.

The eyes are arranged in two rows with the posterior eye row more recurved than the anterior eye row. The anterior lateral eyes are larger than the rest. The lateral eyes sit on low distinctly placed tubercles. The anterior median eyes are wider spaced than the anterior lateral eyes. The median ocular quadrangle is longer than wide and parallel or wider anteriorly.

The abdomen is round with thick coriaceous integument bearing spiniform, clavate or spatuliform setae. Legs I and II are short and thick with strong spines. These spiders resemble Xysticus but are smaller in size.

== Life style ==
Members of Ozyptila are free-living ground dwellers.

== Species ==
As of October 2025, this genus includes 103 species and two subspecies.

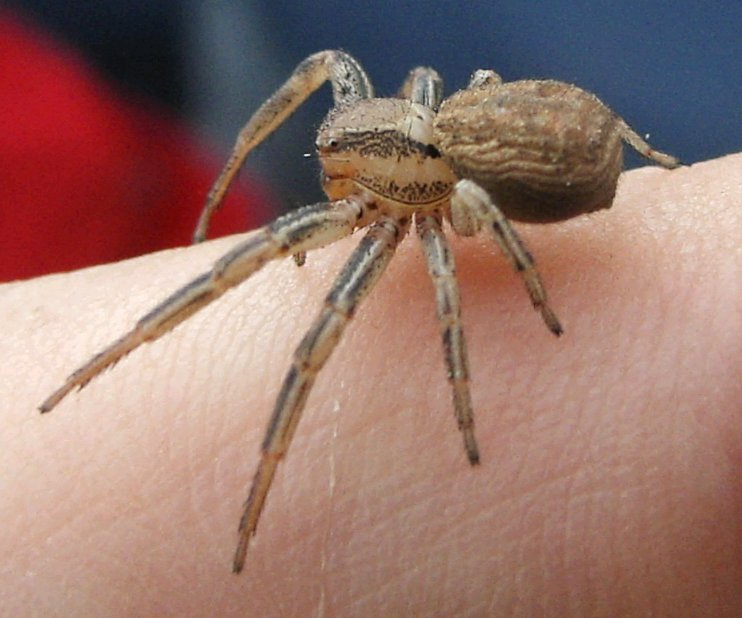
O. atomaria

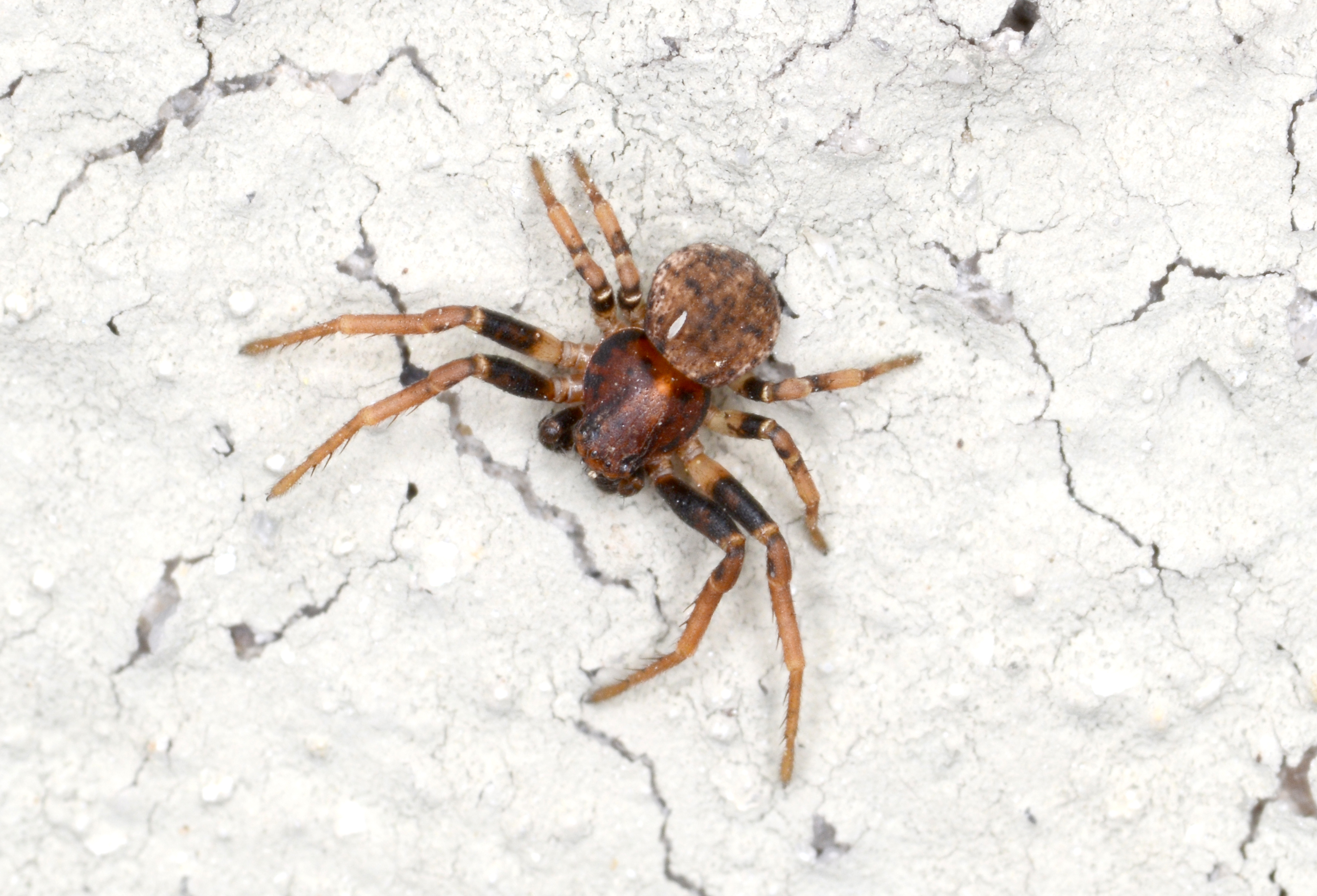
O. praticola

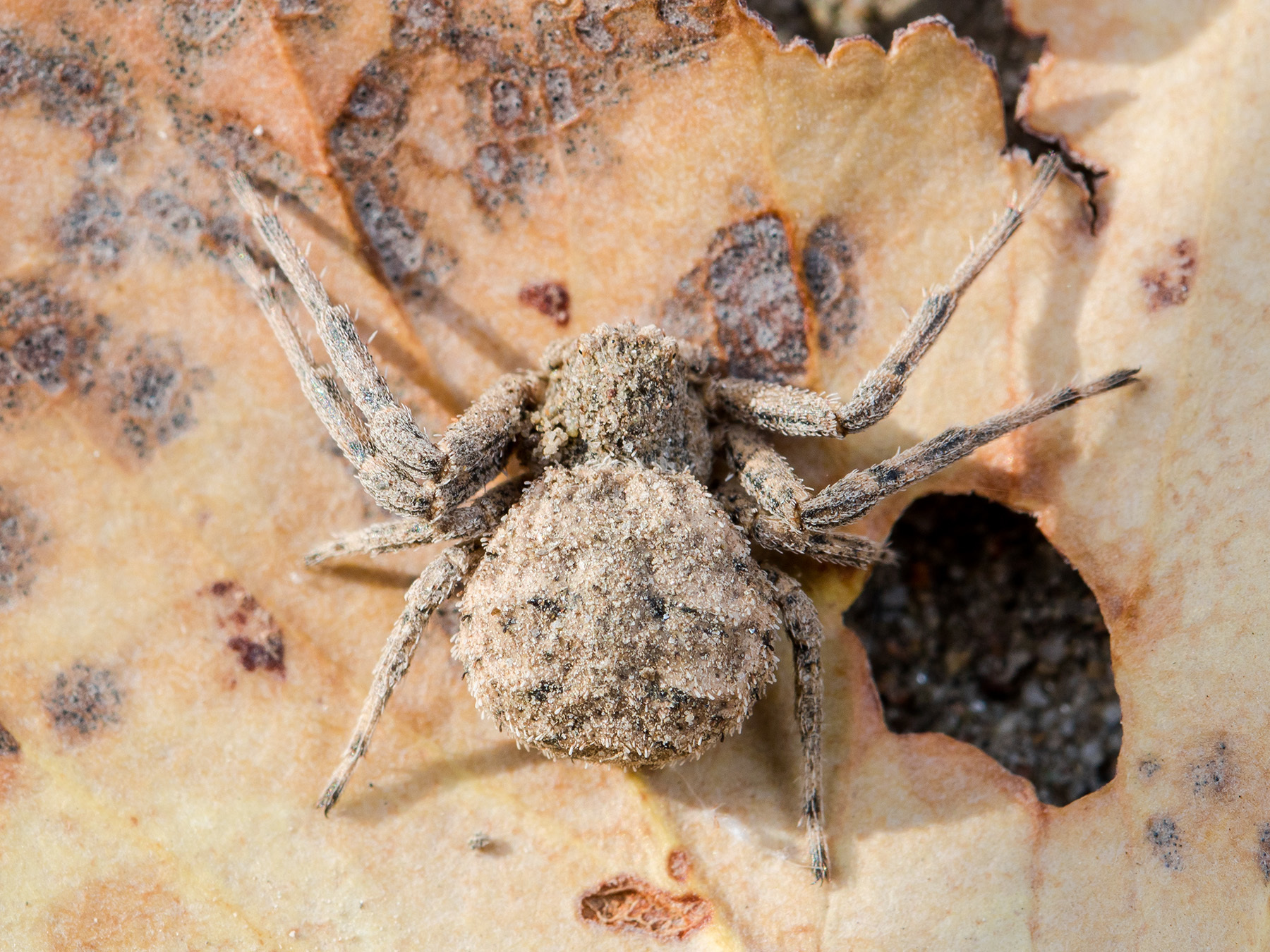
O. tuberosa

These species have articles on Wikipedia:

- Ozyptila atomaria (Panzer, 1801) – Europe, Turkey, Caucasus, Russia (Europe to Far East), Kazakhstan, Iran, Central Asia, China, Korea, Japan
- Ozyptila bejarana Urones, 1998 – Spain, France
- Ozyptila caenosa Jézéquel, 1966 – Ivory Coast, Kenya, South Africa, Yemen
- Ozyptila confluens (C. L. Koch, 1845) – Southern Europe, Syria
- Ozyptila danubiana Weiss, 1998 – Romania, Greece
- Ozyptila distans Dondale & Redner, 1975 – Canada, United States
- Ozyptila elegans (Blackwall, 1870) – Italy
- Ozyptila flava Simon, 1875 – Spain
- Ozyptila furcula L. Koch, 1882 – Spain (mainland, Balearic Is.), France
- Ozyptila gertschi Kurata, 1944 – North America, Europe, Russia (Far East)
- Ozyptila ladina Thaler & Zingerle, 1998 – Italy
- Ozyptila monroensis Keyserling, 1884 – Canada, United States
- Ozyptila pacifica Banks, 1895 – Alaska, Canada, United States
- Ozyptila perplexa Simon, 1875 – Portugal, Spain, France, Algeria
- Ozyptila praticola (C. L. Koch, 1837) – Europe, Turkey, Caucasus, Russia (Europe to South Siberia), Kazakhstan, Iran, Central Asia. Introduced to Canada, United States, Argentina
- Ozyptila salustri Wunderlich, 2011 – Italy
- Ozyptila secreta Thaler, 1987 – Switzerland, Italy
- Ozyptila sincera Kulczyński, 1926 – Russia (Europe to Far East), China, Korea, Japan
- Ozyptila trux (Blackwall, 1846) – Europe, Caucasus, Russia (Europe to Far East), Japan. Introduced to Canada
- Ozyptila umbraculorum Simon, 1932 – Portugal, Spain, France
- Ozyptila westringi (Thorell, 1873) – Sweden, Netherlands, Germany

Complete list of species as of October 2025
- Ozyptila aculipalpus Wunderlich, 1995 – Turkey, Iran
- Ozyptila americana Banks, 1895 – Canada, United States
- Ozyptila amkhasensis Tikader, 1980 – India
- Ozyptila ankarensis Karol, 1966 – Turkey
- Ozyptila annulipes (Lucas, 1846) – Algeria
- Ozyptila arctica Kulczyński, 1908 – North America, Northern Europe, Russia (Europe to Far East)
- Ozyptila aspex Pavesi, 1895 – Ethiopia
- Ozyptila atlantica Denis, 1963 – Canary Islands, Salvages
- Ozyptila atomaria (Panzer, 1801) – Europe, Turkey, Caucasus, Russia (Europe to Far East), Kazakhstan, Iran, Central Asia, China, Korea, Japan
- Ozyptila balcanica Deltshev, Blagoev, Komnenov & Lazarov, 2016 – Albania, North Macedonia, Bulgaria, Greece
- Ozyptila barbara Denis, 1945 – Algeria
- Ozyptila beaufortensis Strand, 1916 – Canada, United States
- Ozyptila bejarana Urones, 1998 – Spain, France
- Ozyptila biprominula Tang & Li, 2010 – China
- Ozyptila brevipes (Hahn, 1826) – Europe, Russia (Europe to Middle Siberia), Turkey, Armenia
- Ozyptila caenosa Jézéquel, 1966 – Ivory Coast, Kenya, South Africa, Yemen
- Ozyptila callitys (Thorell, 1875) – Tunisia
- Ozyptila canadensis Dondale & Redner, 1975 – Alaska, Canada, United States
- Ozyptila chandosiensis Tikader, 1980 – India
- Ozyptila claveata (Walckenaer, 1837) – Europe, Turkey, Georgia, Azerbaijan, Iran (type species)
- Ozyptila clavidorsum Roewer, 1959 – Turkey
- Ozyptila clavigera (O. Pickard-Cambridge, 1872) – Israel
- Ozyptila confluens (C. L. Koch, 1845) – Southern Europe, Syria
- Ozyptila conostyla Hippa, Koponen & Oksala, 1986 – Turkey to Turkmenistan
- Ozyptila conspurcata Thorell, 1877 – Canada, United States
- Ozyptila creola Gertsch, 1953 – United States
- Ozyptila curvata Dondale & Redner, 1975 – Canada, United States
- Ozyptila dagestana Ponomarev & Dvadnenko, 2011 – Russia (Caucasus)
- Ozyptila danubiana Weiss, 1998 – Romania, Greece
- Ozyptila distans Dondale & Redner, 1975 – Canada, United States
- Ozyptila elegans (Blackwall, 1870) – Italy
- Ozyptila flava Simon, 1875 – Spain
- Ozyptila formosa Bryant, 1930 – United States
- Ozyptila fukushimai Ono, 2002 – Japan
- Ozyptila furcula L. Koch, 1882 – Spain (mainland, Balearic Is.), France
- Ozyptila fusca (Grube, 1861) – Russia (eastern Siberia)
- Ozyptila gasanensis Paik, 1985 – Korea
- Ozyptila georgiana Keyserling, 1880 – Canada, United States
- Ozyptila gertschi Kurata, 1944 – North America, Europe, Russia (Far East)
- Ozyptila geumoensis Seo & Sohn, 1997 – Korea
- Ozyptila grisea Roewer, 1955 – Iran, Afghanistan
- Ozyptila hardyi Gertsch, 1953 – United States
- Ozyptila imbrex Tang & Li, 2010 – China
- Ozyptila inaequalis (Kulczyński, 1901) – Kazakhstan, China
- Ozyptila inglesi Schick, 1965 – United States
- Ozyptila izmirica Danışman, Yağmur, Coşar, Kunt & Karakuş, 2025 – Turkey
- Ozyptila jabalpurensis Bhandari & Gajbe, 2001 – India
- Ozyptila jeholensis Saito, 1936 – China
- Ozyptila judaea Levy, 1975 – Morocco, Egypt, Israel
- Ozyptila kahramanmarasensis Coşar & Danışman, 2021 – Turkey
- Ozyptila kaszabi Marusik & Logunov, 2002 – Mongolia, China
- Ozyptila khasi Tikader, 1961 – India
- Ozyptila ladina Thaler & Zingerle, 1998 – Italy
- Ozyptila laevis Denis, 1954 – Morocco
- Ozyptila leprieuri Simon, 1875 – Morocco, Algeria, Malta?
- Ozyptila lugubris (Kroneberg, 1875) – Kazakhstan, Iran, Turkmenistan, Uzbekistan, China
- Ozyptila lutosa Ono & Martens, 2005 – Iran
- Ozyptila makidica Ono & Martens, 2005 – Iran
- Ozyptila manii Tikader, 1961 – India
- Ozyptila maratha Tikader, 1971 – India
- Ozyptila matsumotoi Ono, 1988 – Japan
- Ozyptila metschensis Strand, 1906 – Ethiopia, East Africa
- Ozyptila mikhailovi Ponomarev, 2021 – Russia (Europe)
- Ozyptila mingrelica Mcheidze, 1971 – Georgia
- Ozyptila monroensis Keyserling, 1884 – Canada, United States
- Ozyptila nipponica Ono, 1985 – China, Korea, Japan
- Ozyptila nongae Paik, 1974 – Russia (Far East), China, Korea, Japan
- Ozyptila numida (Lucas, 1846) – Algeria
- Ozyptila omega Levy, 1975 – Israel
- Ozyptila oraria Dondale & Redner, 1975 – United States
- Ozyptila orientalis Kulczyński, 1926 – Russia (South Siberia to Far East), Mongolia, China
  - O. o. balkarica Ovtsharenko, 1979 – Caucasus (Russia, Georgia)
  - O. o. basegica Esyunin, 1992 – Russia (Urals)
- Ozyptila pacifica Banks, 1895 – Alaska, Canada, United States
- Ozyptila panganica Caporiacco, 1947 – East Africa
- Ozyptila parvimana Simon, 1886 – Senegal
- Ozyptila patellibidens Levy, 1999 – Italy (Sicily), Turkey, Israel, Iran
- Ozyptila pauxilla (Simon, 1870) – Western Mediterranean
- Ozyptila perplexa Simon, 1875 – Portugal, Spain, France, Algeria
- Ozyptila praticola (C. L. Koch, 1837) – Europe, Turkey, Caucasus, Russia (Europe to South Siberia), Kazakhstan, Iran, Central Asia. Introduced to Canada, United States, Argentina
- Ozyptila pullata (Thorell, 1875) – Europe
- Ozyptila rauda Simon, 1875 – Europe, Turkey, Caucasus, Russia (Europe to South Siberia, Kamchatka), Kazakhstan
- Ozyptila rigida (O. Pickard-Cambridge, 1872) – Russia (Caucasus), Azerbaijan, Cyprus, Turkey, Israel, Saudi Arabia
- Ozyptila sakhalinensis Ono, Marusik & Logunov, 1990 – Russia (Far East), Japan
- Ozyptila salustri Wunderlich, 2011 – Italy
- Ozyptila sanctuaria (O. Pickard-Cambridge, 1871) – Europe
- Ozyptila scabricula (Westring, 1851) – Europe, Caucasus, Russia (Europe to Far East), Central Asia, China, Korea
- Ozyptila secreta Thaler, 1987 – Switzerland, Italy
- Ozyptila sedotmikha Levy, 2007 – Israel
- Ozyptila shuangqiaoensis Yin, Peng, Gong & Kim, 1999 – China
- Ozyptila simplex (O. Pickard-Cambridge, 1862) – Europe, Turkey, Russia (Europe to Middle Siberia), Iran
- Ozyptila sincera Kulczyński, 1926 – Russia (Europe to Far East), China, Korea, Japan
- Ozyptila spinosissima Caporiacco, 1935 – India (Karakorum)
- Ozyptila spirembola Wunderlich, 1995 – Turkey
- Ozyptila tenerifensis Wunderlich, 1992 – Canary Islands
- Ozyptila theobaldi Simon, 1886 – India
- Ozyptila tricoloripes Strand, 1913 – Turkey, Caucasus, Israel, Iran, Kazakhstan, Turkmenistan
- Ozyptila trux (Blackwall, 1846) – Europe, Caucasus, Russia (Europe to Far East), Japan. Introduced to Canada
- Ozyptila tuberosa (Thorell, 1875) – Ukraine, Russia (Europe), Caucasus, Turkey, Kazakhstan, Bulgaria?
- Ozyptila umbraculorum Simon, 1932 – Portugal, Spain, France
- Ozyptila utotchkini Marusik, 1990 – Russia (Far East), Korea
- Ozyptila varica Simon, 1875 – Algeria
- Ozyptila westringi (Thorell, 1873) – Sweden, Netherlands, Germany
- Ozyptila wuchangensis Tang & Song, 1988 – China
- Ozyptila yosemitica Schick, 1965 – United States

== See also ==
- List of Thomisidae species
