= Stiphropella =

Fat Leg Crab Spider

Scientific classification
- Kingdom: Animalia
- Phylum: Arthropoda
- Subphylum: Chelicerata
- Class: Arachnida
- Order: Araneae
- Infraorder: Araneomorphae
- Family: Thomisidae
- Genus: Stiphropella
- Species: S. gracilis

Binomial name
- Stiphropella gracilis Lawrence, 1952

Synonyms
- Stiphropella gracile Lawrence, 1952

Species of spider

Stiphropella gracilis is a species of spider of the genus Stiphropella. It is endemic to South Africa. The species is the sole member of its genus, making Stiphropella monotypic.

== Etymology ==
The specific name gracilis is Latin meaning "slender" or "graceful".The genus name is a variation of the genus Stiphropus, which it resembles in general appearance.

== Distribution ==
Stiphropella gracilis has been recorded from three provinces in South Africa: KwaZulu-Natal, North West, and Mpumalanga. Specific localities include Weenen Nature Reserve (the type locality), Hluhluwe Nature Reserve, Pilanesberg Nature Reserve, Marble Hall, and Ermelo. The species has been found at elevations ranging from 187 to 1198 metres above sea level.

== Habitat ==
The spider is free-living and inhabits low vegetation close to ground level. Remarkably, the species has been observed in association with ants, particularly Anoplolepis custodiens. In Ermelo, observations documented a mutualistic relationship where the ants appeared to protect the spiders by dragging them into holes and crevices, with no predation occurring despite the spiders being among the ant colony.

== Description ==
Stiphropella gracilis resembles Stiphropus in general appearance and eye arrangement, but differs significantly in its much larger size. Only females are currently known to science.

The female has a total length of 6 mm with a carapace length of 2.6 mm. The cephalothorax and chelicerae are rich blackish-brown without markings or light areas around the eyes. The pedipalps, legs, and sternum are brown, with the leg femora being darker. The opisthosoma is brown above with an olive green tinge and features some indistinct lighter transverse bars posterior to distinct large sigilla, which are reddish-brown. The ventral surface is yellow-brown.

The carapace is longer than wide, smooth and shiny, covered with numerous small pits and fine golden setose hairs. The eyes are arranged in two rows, with the anterior row less recurved than the posterior row and much less wide. The anterior lateral eyes are larger than the anterior median eyes.

The legs are notably modified, with the anterior tibiae much thickened apically, being almost twice as wide as the metatarsi basally. The tarsi are stout and parallel-sided, approximately 1.5 times as long as the metatarsi. All legs lack spines but have well-scopulated tarsi below. The claws are large and conspicuous, especially on the posterior legs, where they are smooth except for 5–6 small teeth at the extreme base.

== Conservation status ==
The species has been assessed as Least Concern on a national level in South Africa. While known from only a few localities, it has a relatively wide geographical range. The species is protected within several nature reserves including Hluhluwe Nature Reserve, Weenen Nature Reserve, and Pilanesberg Nature Reserve.

== Taxonomy ==
The genus has not been revised since its original description, and only the female is known. The species was originally described as Stiphropella gracile but the name was subsequently corrected to gracilis.
