= Stiphropus sigillatus =

Scientific classification
- Kingdom: Animalia
- Phylum: Arthropoda
- Subphylum: Chelicerata
- Class: Arachnida
- Order: Araneae
- Infraorder: Araneomorphae
- Family: Thomisidae
- Genus: Stiphropus
- Species: S. sigillatus

Binomial name
- Stiphropus sigillatus (O. Pickard-Cambridge, 1883)

Species of spider

Stiphropus sigillatus is a species of spiders of the genus Stiphropus. It is endemic to Sri Lanka.

== See also ==
- List of Thomisidae species
