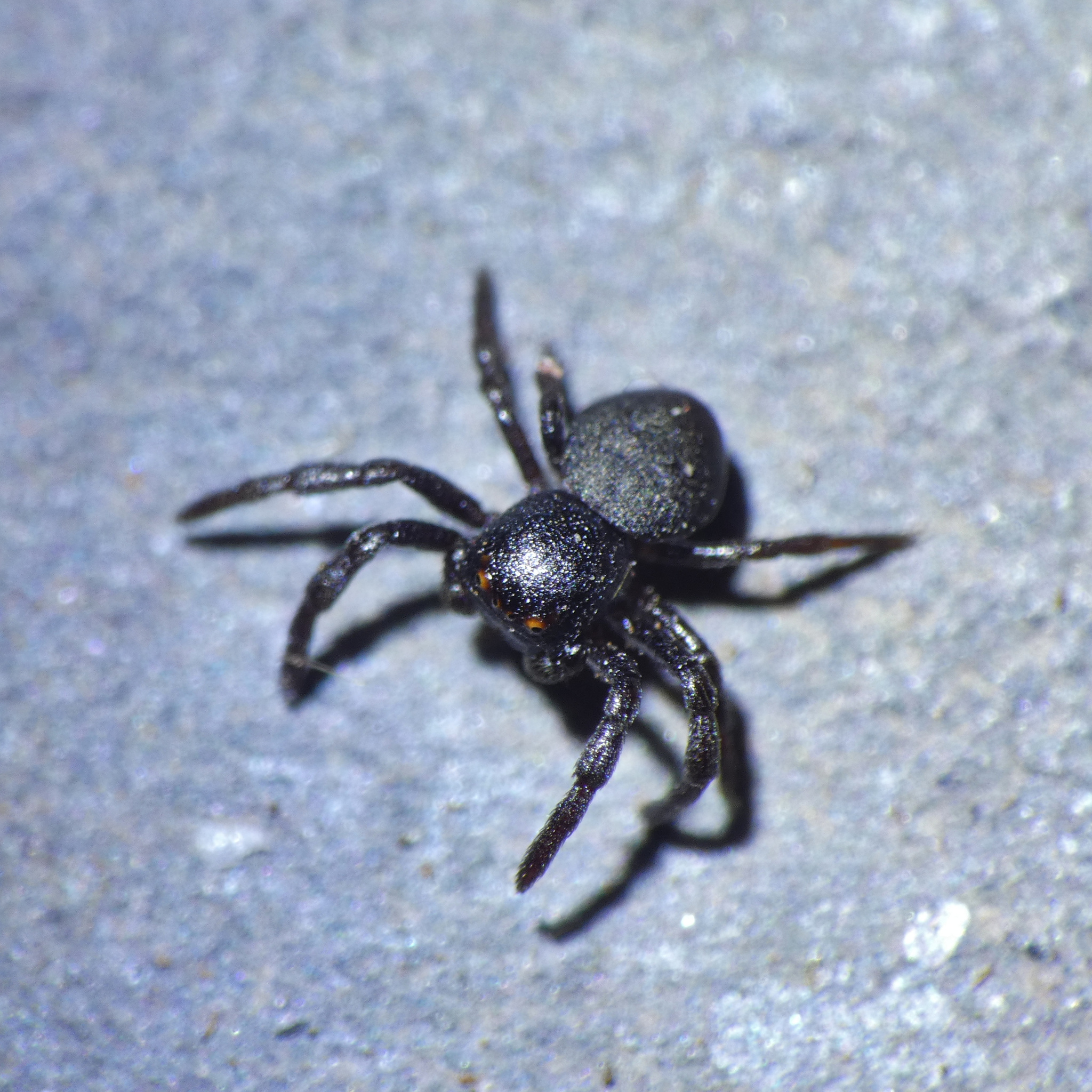
- S. affinis from Zimbabwe
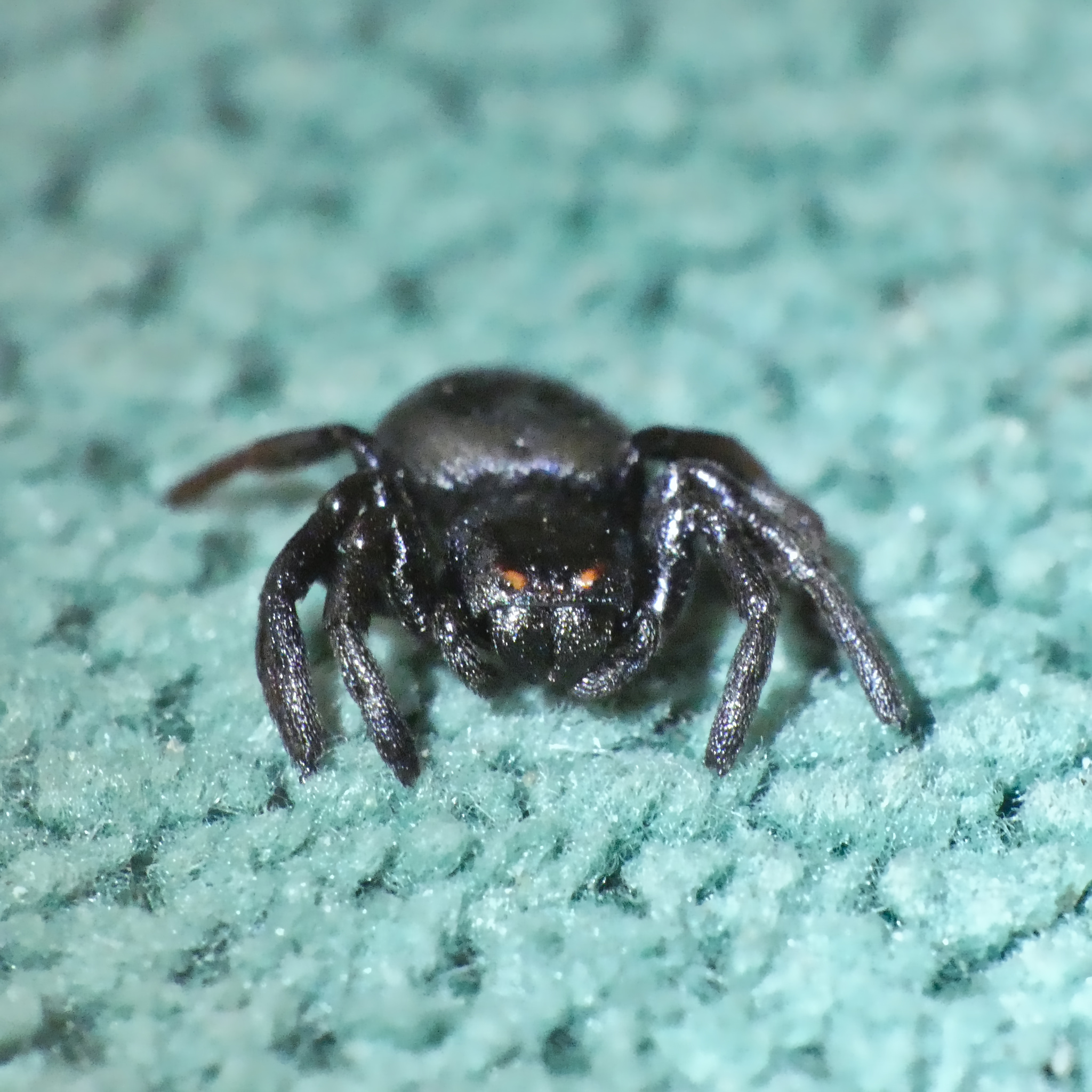

Scientific classification
- Kingdom: Animalia
- Phylum: Arthropoda
- Subphylum: Chelicerata
- Class: Arachnida
- Order: Araneae
- Infraorder: Araneomorphae
- Family: Thomisidae
- Genus: Stiphropus
- Species: S. affinis

Binomial name
- Stiphropus affinis Lessert, 1923

= Stiphropus affinis =

Species of spider

Stiphropus affinis is a species of spider of the genus Stiphropus. It is endemic to southern Africa, where it occurs in Botswana and South Africa.

== Distribution ==
Stiphropus affinis has been recorded from Botswana and eight provinces of South Africa. In South Africa, it has been found in the Eastern Cape, Free State, Gauteng, KwaZulu-Natal, Limpopo, Mpumalanga, Northern Cape, and Western Cape provinces. The species occurs at elevations ranging from 22 to 1,416 meters above sea level.

== Habitat ==
Stiphropus affinis is free-living in low vegetation close to ground level. It has been sampled from multiple biomes including the Grassland, Indian Ocean Coastal Belt, Nama Karoo, Savanna and Thicket biomes.

== Description ==
Females have a body length of 5.2 mm, with males only 3.5 mm.

=== Females ===
In females, the cephalothorax is black with orange-colored projections around the anterior lateral and posterior lateral eyes. The chelicerae, mouthparts, sternum, and legs are dark brown to black. The opisthosoma is dark grayish-black. The cephalothorax is brilliant, punctured and covered with granulations, approximately as long as wide, slightly rounded on the sides and slightly narrowed toward the front.

The anterior eyes are arranged in an almost straight line at their bases, with the median eyes about one-third smaller than the lateral eyes. The posterior eyes are unequal in size, arranged in a strongly recurved line. The median eyes of both rows, viewed from the front, are unequal and arranged in a strongly backward-sloping trapezoid that is wider at the back than in length.

The chelicerae are vertical, flat and covered with granulations at the front, with the lower margin smooth and the upper margin bearing a series of nine spiniform teeth. The legs are covered with granulations, with the first pair having robust tibiae that are slightly dilated at the front.

The opisthosoma is depressed and finely granulated, as wide as long, marked above with three impressions. The epigyne is not very distinct, marked with a poorly defined depression limited at the front by a semicircular chitinous border and at the back by two lobes joined along the median line.

=== Males ===
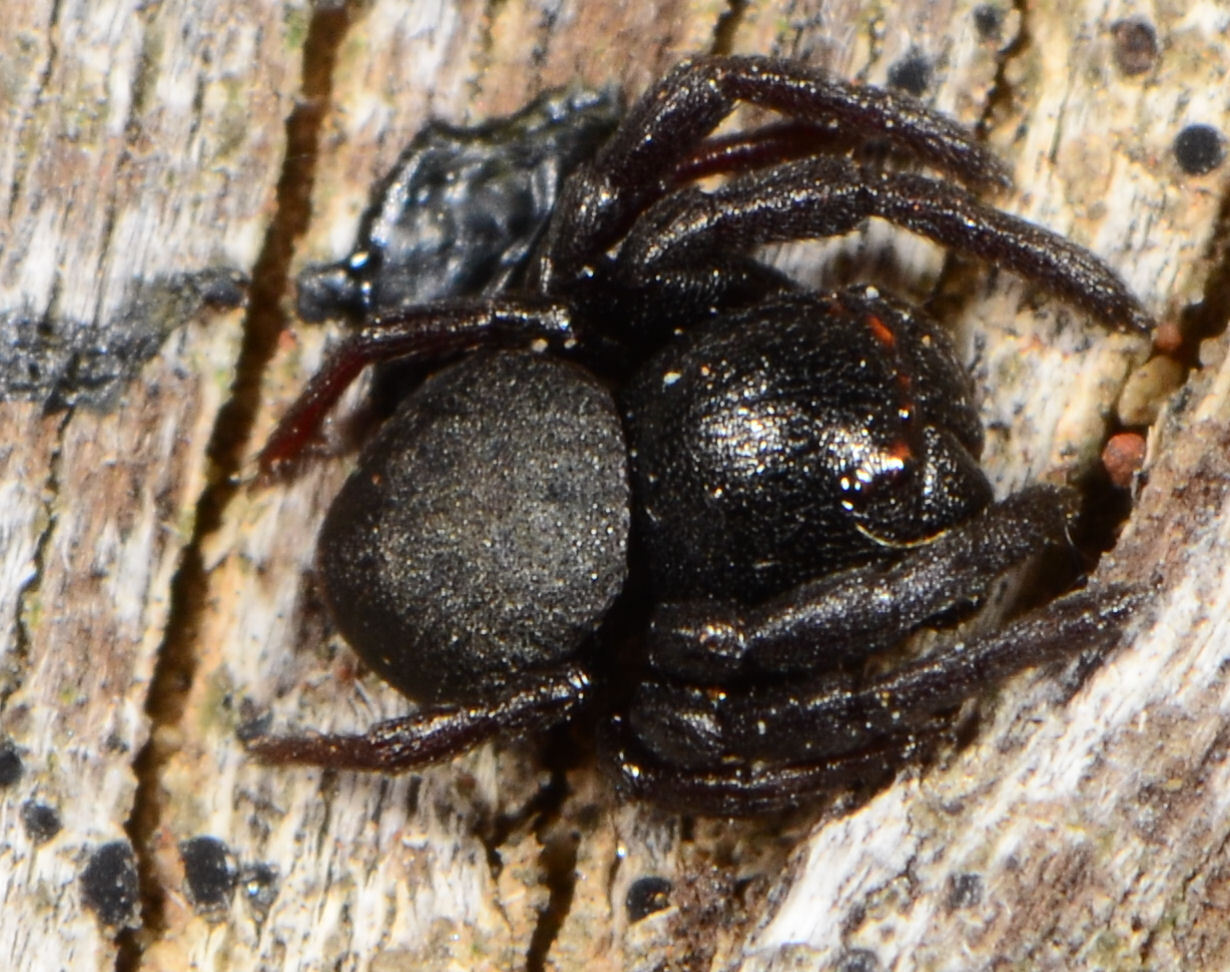
male

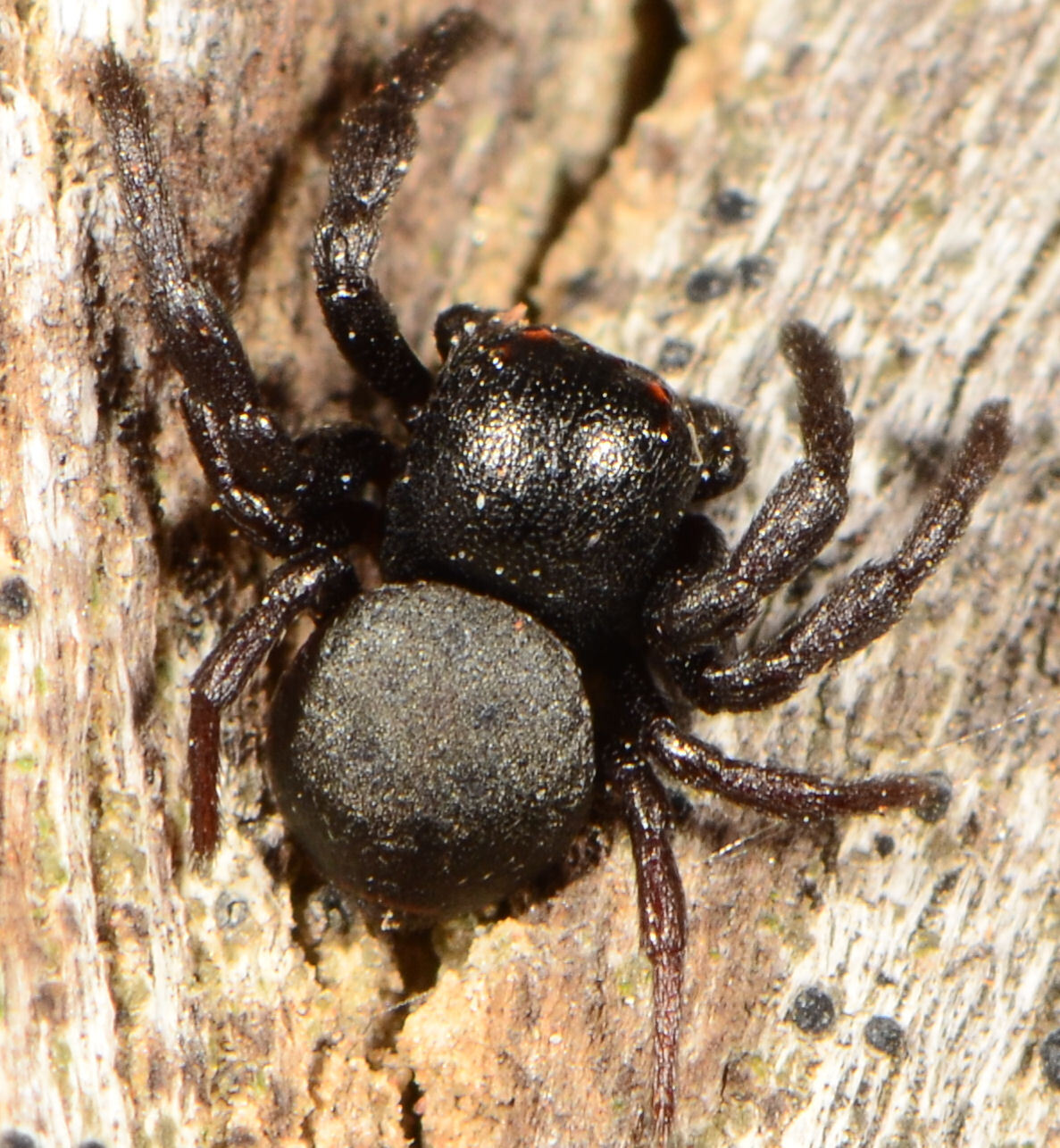
male

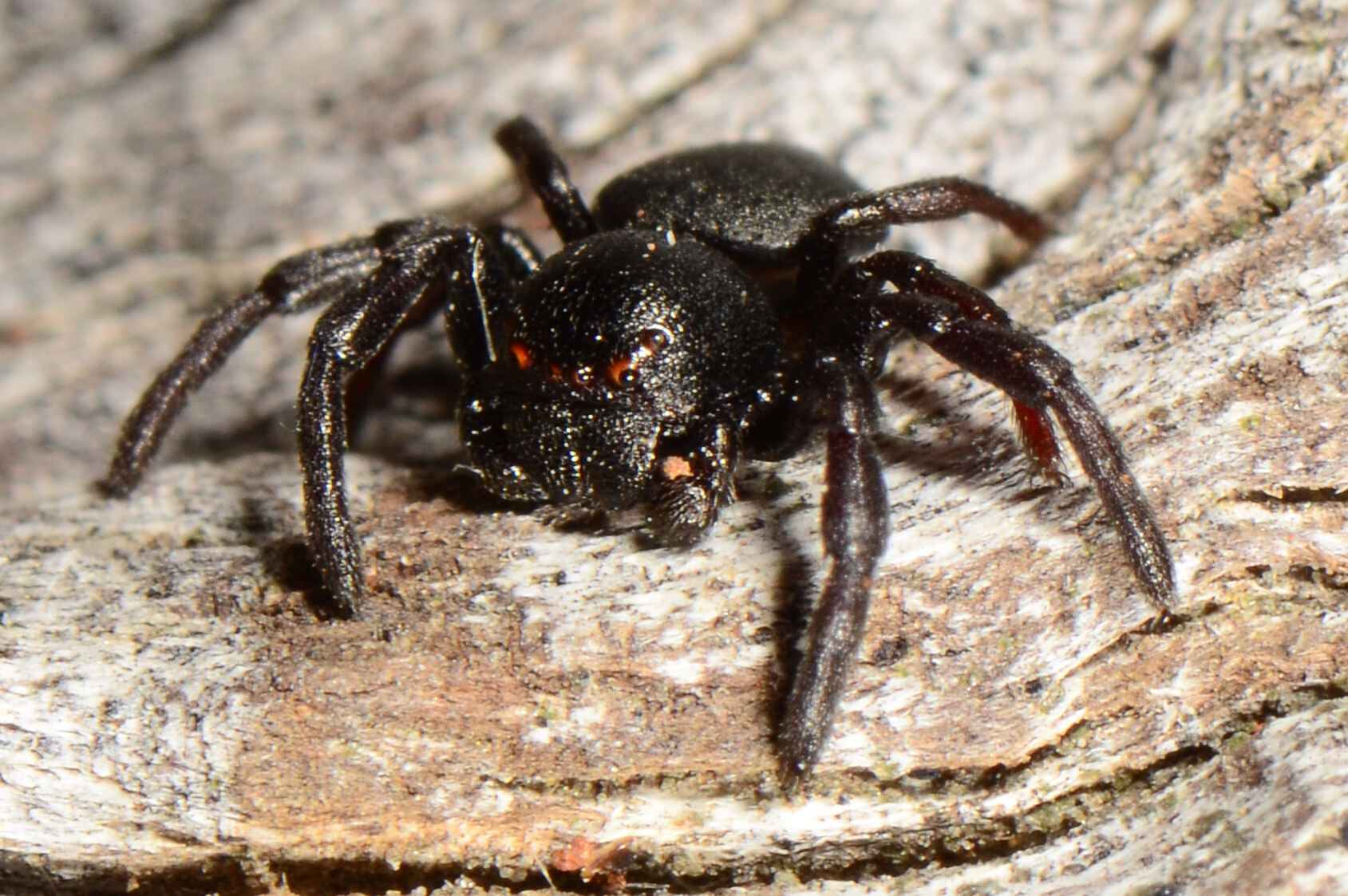
male

Males have similar coloration and characteristics to the female, but with a non-attenuated cephalothorax at the front, with nearly parallel and straight borders. The pedipalps are dark brown.

== Conservation status ==
Stiphropus affinis is listed as Least Concern due to its wide geographical range in southern Africa. The species has an estimated extent of occurrence of 666,224 km² and an area of occupancy of 60 km². It is protected in several protected areas including Addo Elephant National Park, Kruger National Park, and Karoo National Park.
