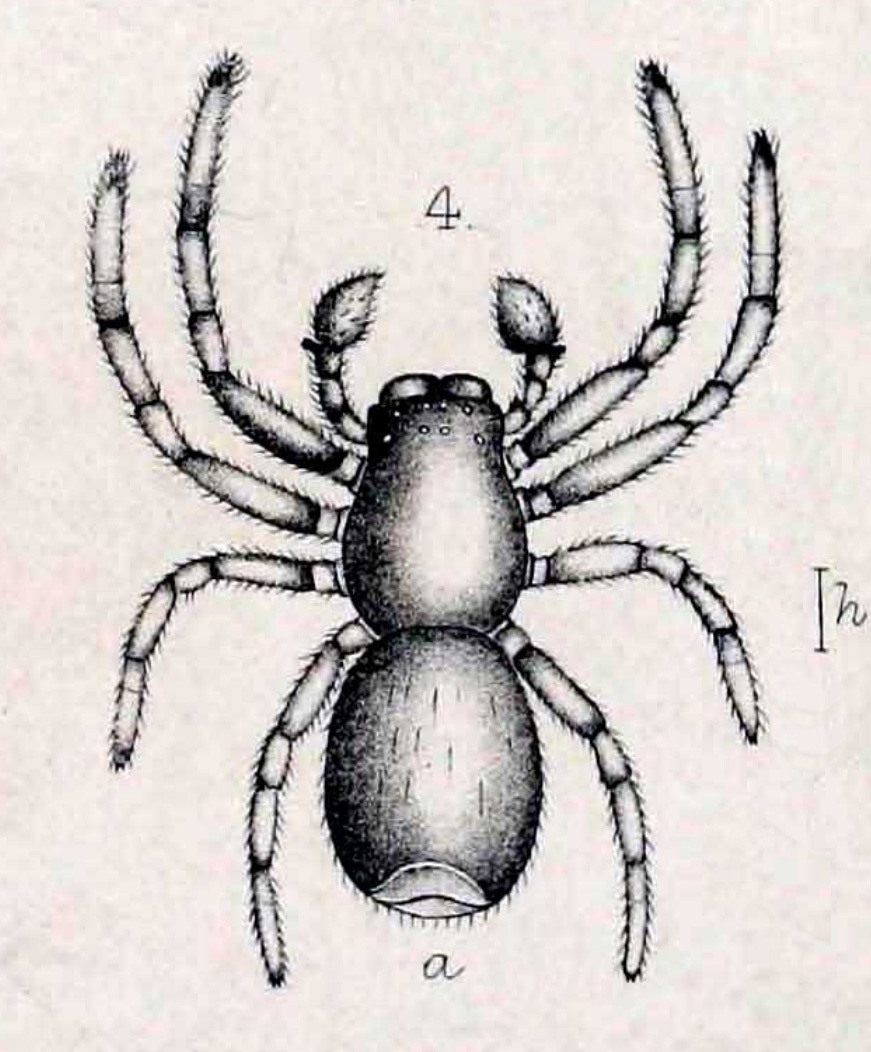
- male from original description

Conservation status
- Data Deficient (IUCN 3.1)

Scientific classification
- Kingdom: Animalia
- Phylum: Arthropoda
- Subphylum: Chelicerata
- Class: Arachnida
- Order: Araneae
- Infraorder: Araneomorphae
- Family: Thomisidae
- Genus: Stiphropus
- Species: S. drassiformis

Binomial name
- Stiphropus drassiformis (O. Pickard-Cambridge, 1883)

Synonyms
- Cyrsillus drassiformis O. Pickard-Cambridge, 1883

= Stiphropus drassiformis =

Species of spider

Stiphropus drassiformis is a species of crab spider in the family Thomisidae. It is endemic to South Africa.

== Etymology ==
The specific name drassiformis likely refers to the spider's resemblance to members of the family Gnaphosidae (ground spiders), formerly known as Drassidae.

== Taxonomy ==
The species was originally described as Cyrsillus drassiformis by Octavius Pickard-Cambridge in 1883. It was later transferred to the genus Stiphropus by Lessert in 1919.

== Distribution ==
Stiphropus drassiformis is known only from South Africa, where it was originally described from a location called "Caffraria" in what is now the Eastern Cape Province. The exact distribution remains poorly known due to limited collecting efforts.

== Habitat ==
The species inhabits low vegetation close to ground level.

== Description ==
Only the male of Stiphropus drassiformis has been described, with a body length of approximately 2 lines (about 4.2 mm).

The cephalothorax is black and thinly clothed with hairs and short bristles, giving the surface a roughened or pock-marked appearance. The clypeus height is less than half that of the facial space. The eye arrangement is distinctive, with the posterior median eyes considerably closer to each other than to the lateral eyes on either side; the anterior row of eyes is much shorter than the posterior row.

The legs are deep rich blackish mahogany in colour, with the femora and genua darker than the remaining segments. The chelicerae are moderately long, strong, conical and vertical, with a flattish anterior surface that has an exterior angular margin. The colour of the chelicerae is similar to that of the cephalothorax, while the maxillae and labium match the leg coloration, and the sternum resembles the cephalothorax.

The pedipalps are short and strong, with the radial joint slightly shorter than the cubital joint. The outer side has two strong obtuse apophyses, with the anterior being the longest and most prominent. The digital joint is large and oviform, and the palpal organs are simple with a strong corneous process around the inner margin.

The opisthosoma has a flattened upper surface covered with a coriaceous (leathery) shield of deep blackish hue, with short dull golden hairs around the margins. The sides are warm purplish brown and deeply longitudinally rugose, with the underside being similar in colour. The spinnerets are very short and positioned in a depression beyond the margin where they are barely visible.

O. Pickard-Cambridge remarked a general resemblance to both ground spiders (Gnaphosidae) and running spiders (Philodromidae) regarding its form.

== Conservation status ==
Stiphropus drassiformis is listed as Data Deficient due to the limited knowledge of its distribution and the fact that only males have been collected. Additional sampling is needed to locate females and better determine the species' range and conservation requirements.
