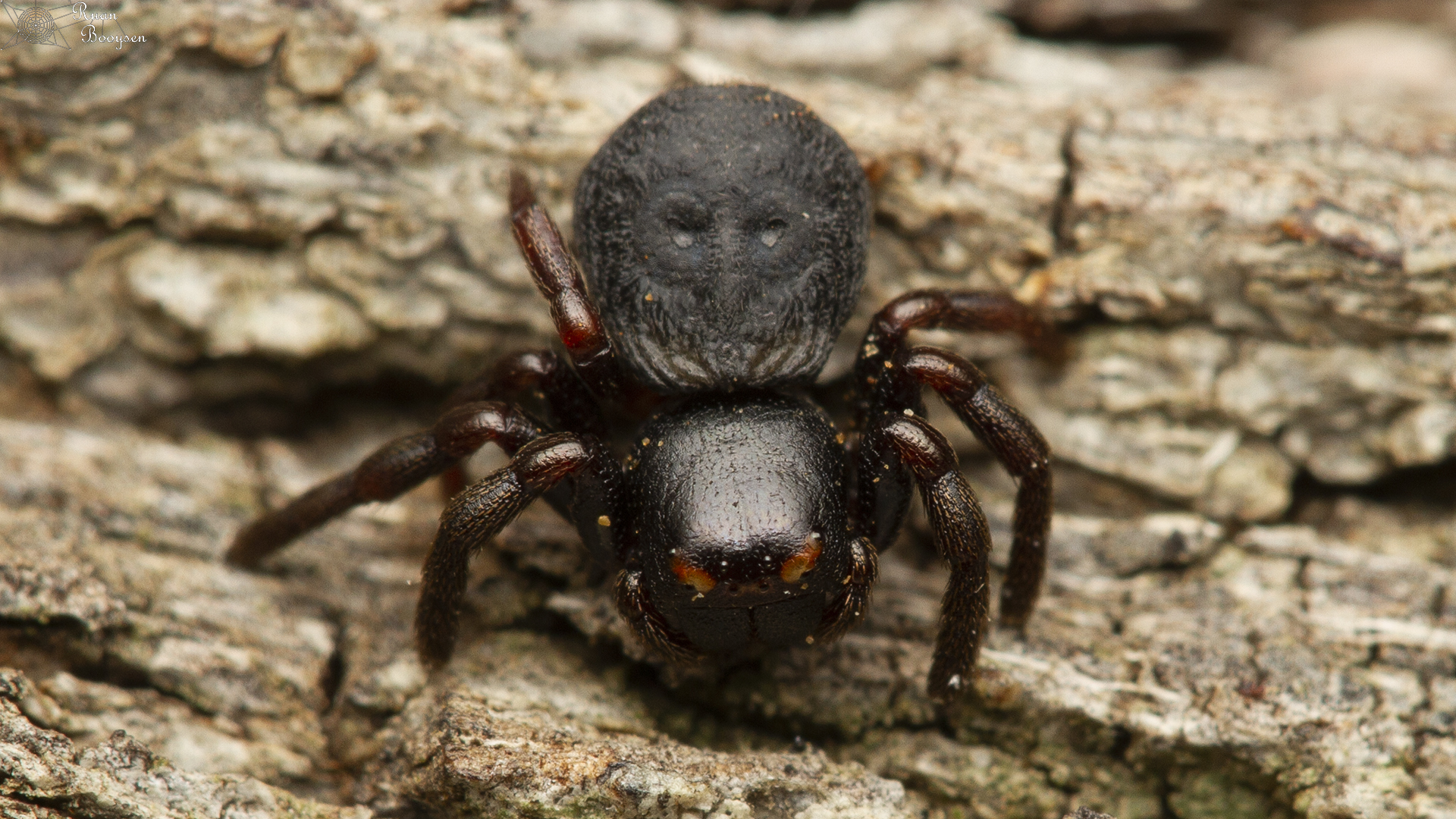
- female
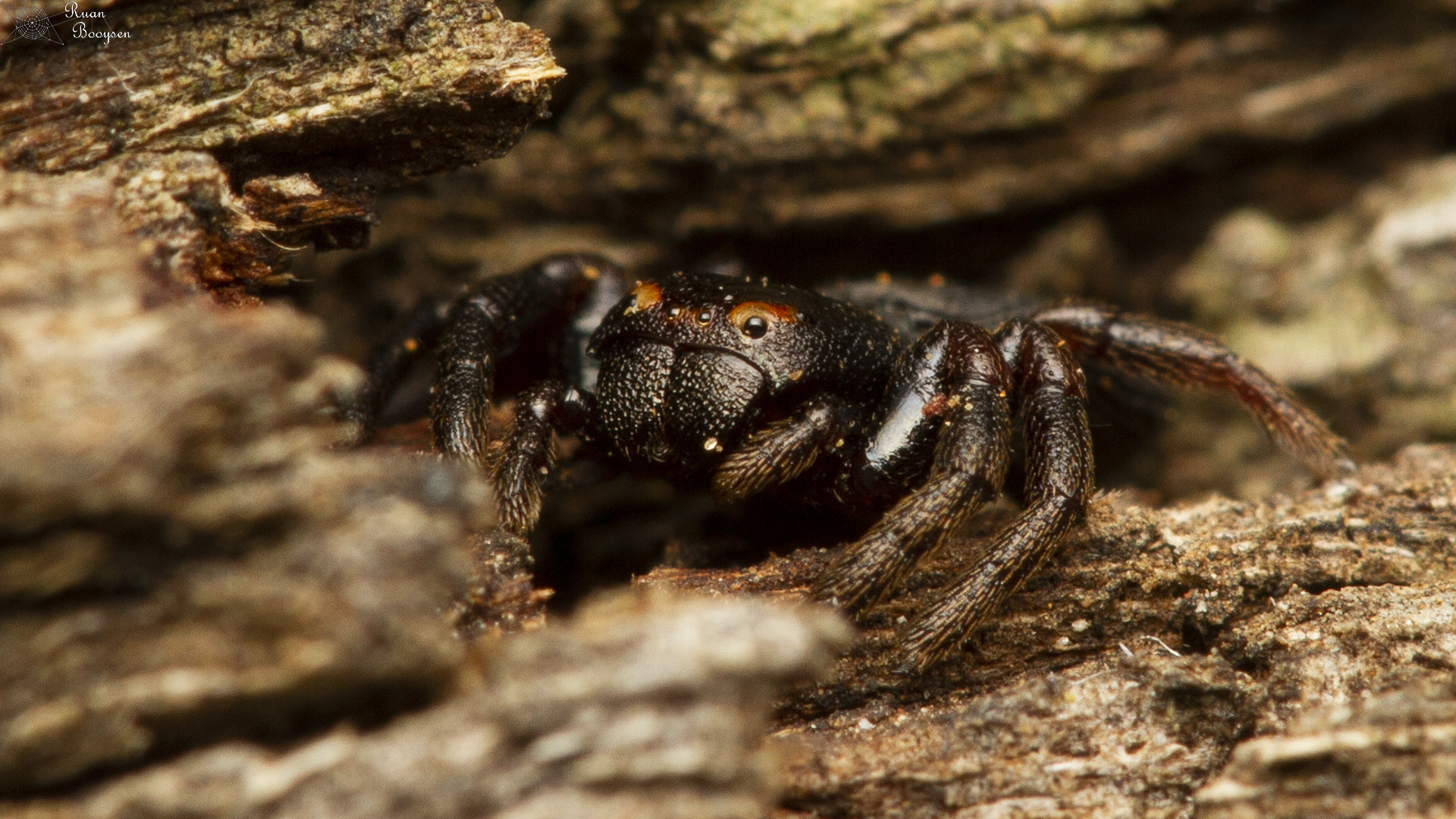
- female

Scientific classification
- Kingdom: Animalia
- Phylum: Arthropoda
- Subphylum: Chelicerata
- Class: Arachnida
- Order: Araneae
- Infraorder: Araneomorphae
- Family: Thomisidae
- Genus: Stiphropus
- Species: S. bisigillatus

Binomial name
- Stiphropus bisigillatus Lawrence, 1952

= Stiphropus bisigillatus =

Two-spotted Stiphropus crab spider

Species of spider

Stiphropus bisigillatus is a species of spider of the genus Stiphropus. It is endemic to southern Africa.

== Etymology ==
The specific name bisigillatus is derived from Latin, meaning "with two sigilla", referring to the characteristic pair of oval sigilla found on the female's opisthosoma.

== Distribution ==
Stiphropus bisigillatus has been recorded from Zimbabwe, Mozambique and South Africa. In South Africa, the species has been documented from six provinces: Eastern Cape, Free State, KwaZulu-Natal, Limpopo, Mpumalanga and North West. It has been found at elevations ranging from 9 to 1478 metres above sea level.

== Habitat ==
The species is typically found in low vegetation close to ground level, inhabiting Forest, Indian Ocean Coastal Belt and Savanna biomes.

== Description ==
Stiphropus bisigillatus is a small crab spider with a total length of 3.5 mm. Only the male has been formally described, though subadult females have been documented.

The male has a general coloration of darkened dish-brown with an opisthosoma showing an olive green tinge. The cephalothorax displays a distinctive narrow black V-shaped margination on the cephalic portion, while the areas surrounding the eyes (except the posterior medians) are cream or orange coloured. The sternum is darker than the legs, with the femora being somewhat darker than the more distal segments. The opisthosoma shows lighter areas on each side at its anterior apex, and the ventral surface is lighter than the dorsal surface.

The eye arrangement is characteristic, with the anterior row weakly recurved and the lateral eyes being 1.5 times as large as the median eyes. The median eyes are slightly more than their own diameter apart and twice as far from the lateral eyes. The posterior row is equidistant, with the median eyes smaller than the laterals. The median ocular quadrangle is wider behind than in front and wider in front than long.

The opisthosoma is almost entirely covered with a smooth rounded scute, with only small portions at the sides and posterior apex left exposed. Males possess a pair of oval sigilla anterior to the middle, similar to those found in females.

The pedipalps feature a conspicuous conical tuft of setae at the inner apex of the tibia. The palpal structure most closely resembles that of S. monardi from Angola, but differs in structural details.

Subadult females can be distinguished by having only two oval sigilla instead of the three arranged in a triangle as seen in S. affinis.

== Conservation status ==
The species has been assessed as Least Concern due to its wide geographical range across southern Africa. It is protected in several nature reserves including Cwebe Nature Reserve, Soetdoring Nature Reserve, Mkuzi Game Reserve, Ndumo Game Reserve and Blouberg Nature Reserve.
