= Stiphropus intermedius =

Scientific classification
- Kingdom: Animalia
- Phylum: Arthropoda
- Subphylum: Chelicerata
- Class: Arachnida
- Order: Araneae
- Infraorder: Araneomorphae
- Family: Thomisidae
- Genus: Stiphropus
- Species: S. intermedius

Binomial name
- Stiphropus intermedius Millot, 1942

Species of crab spider

Stiphropus intermedius is a species of crab spider in the family Thomisidae. It is found across several African countries including Ivory Coast, Cameroon, Tanzania, Mozambique, and South Africa.

== Distribution ==
Stiphropus intermedius has been recorded from Ivory Coast, Tanzania, Mozambique, Cameroon, and South Africa. In South Africa, the species is known from three provinces: Gauteng, KwaZulu-Natal, and North West, where it has been found at elevations ranging from 47 to 1,247 meters above sea level.

Specific South African localities include Roodeplaatdam Nature Reserve in Gauteng, Ndumo Game Reserve, Ophathe Game Reserve, and Hluhluwe Nature Reserve in KwaZulu-Natal, and Pilanesberg Nature Reserve in North West Province.

== Habitat ==
The species inhabits low vegetation close to ground level and has been sampled exclusively from the Savanna biome in South Africa.

== Description ==
Female S. intermedius have a dark brown to black cephalothorax with bronze reflections and a reddish border around the lateral and anterior median eyes. The opisthosoma (abdomen) is greyish-yellow, lighter than in other known Stiphropus species, and is marked with seven brown-reddish sigilla with a very finely textured surface. The legs are rusty brown with slightly lighter hip segments.

The cephalothorax is flattened with a rough, punctured surface forming a slightly narrowed trapezoid shape. In the female, it measures 2 mm wide at the summit and 2.3 mm at the base. The front edge is very wide and truncated, extending beyond the chelicerae on each side with a short, blunt tooth at each angle.

The chelicerae are wide and short, barely longer than their width at the base. Their internal margin is straight while the external margin is strongly curved, almost forming a circular arc. The margins are armed with approximately ten irregularly arranged teeth.

The flattened, disc-shaped abdomen is slightly wider than it is tall, measuring 3.7 mm wide by 3.4 mm tall in females. The characteristic seven sigilla consist of three small anterior ones, two large median ones, and two very small posterior ones.

The legs are short and robust with the leg formula 2143. The different leg segments lack true spines but have a dense covering of compound hairs.

== Taxonomy ==
The species was first described by French arachnologist Jacques Millot in 1942 from specimens collected in Ivory Coast. Millot distinguished S. intermedius from other Stiphropus species by its possession of seven abdominal sigilla (muscle attachment scars).

== Conservation status ==
In South Africa, S. intermedius is assessed as Least Concern due to its wide geographical range across the country. The species is protected within several nature reserves including Roodeplaatdam, Ndumo Game Reserve, Ophathe Game Reserve, Hluhluwe Nature Reserve, and Pilanesberg Nature Reserve.
