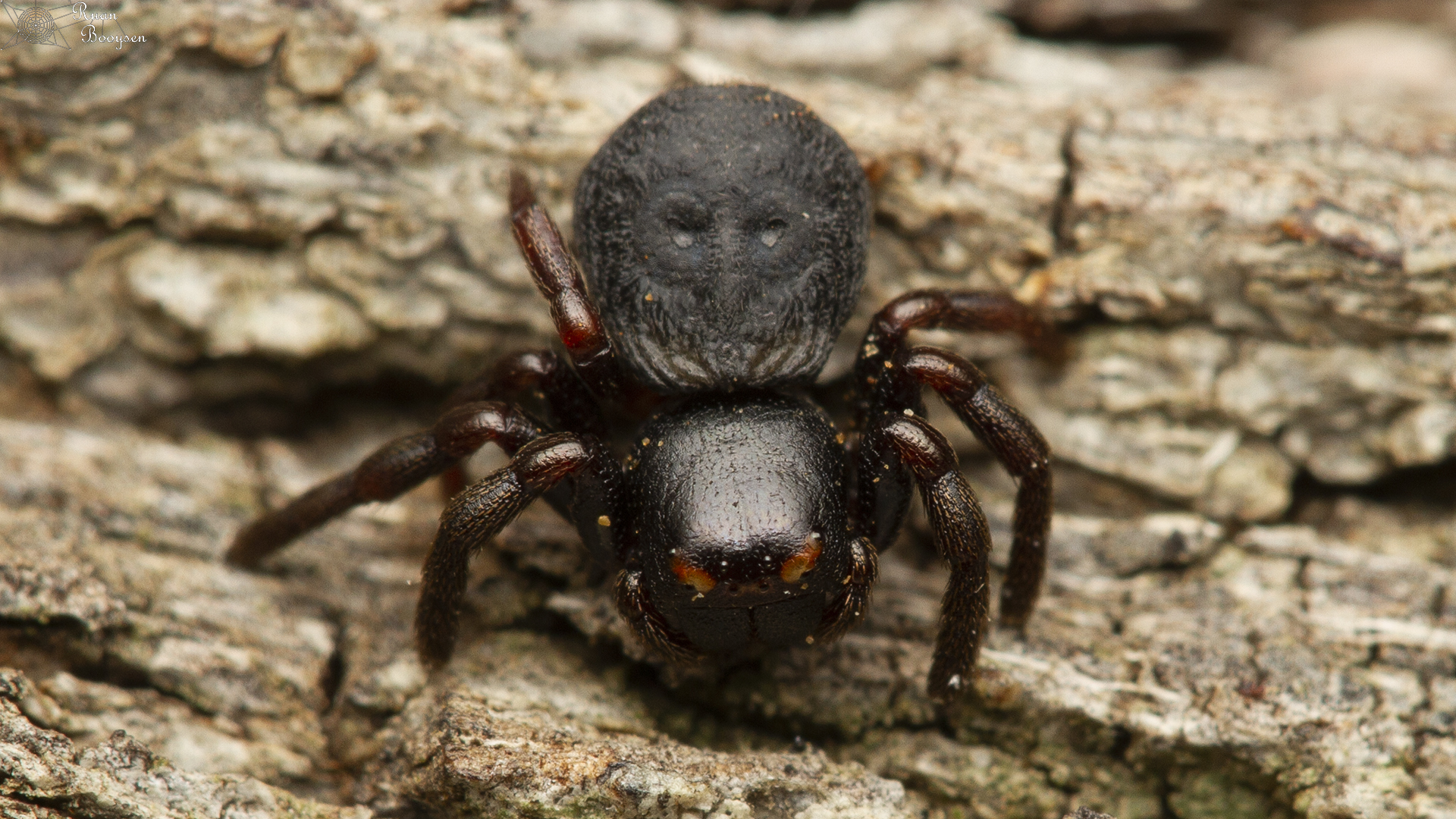
- S. bisigillatus
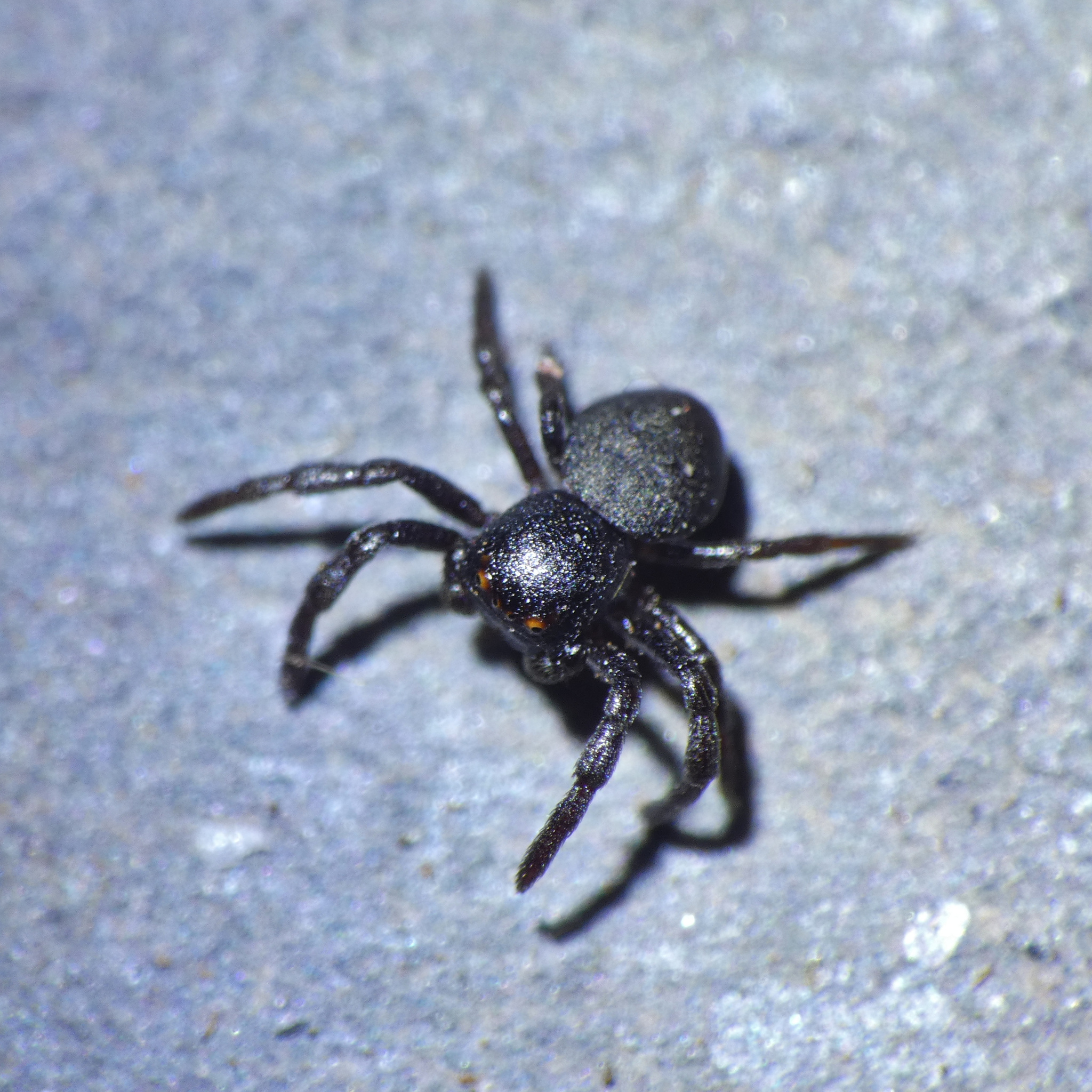
- S. affinis from Zimbabwe

Scientific classification
- Kingdom: Animalia
- Phylum: Arthropoda
- Subphylum: Chelicerata
- Class: Arachnida
- Order: Araneae
- Infraorder: Araneomorphae
- Family: Thomisidae
- Genus: Stiphropus; Gerstaecker, 1873

Type species
- Stiphropus lugubris Gerstäcker, 1873

Species
- See text

Diversity
- 22 species

= Stiphropus =

Genus of spiders

Stiphropus is a genus of crab spiders in the family Thomisidae, with about twenty species from Africa and Asia.

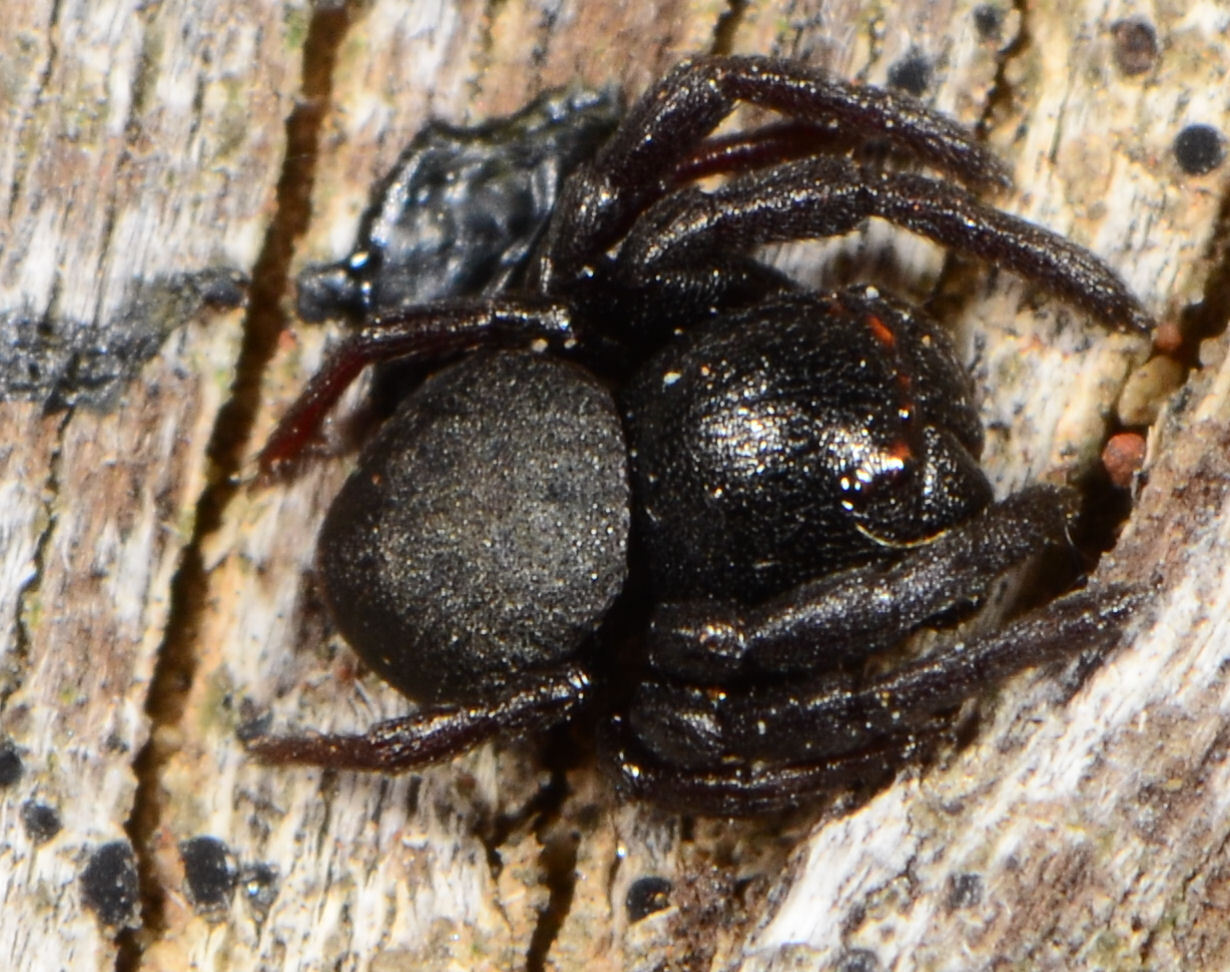
male S. affinis

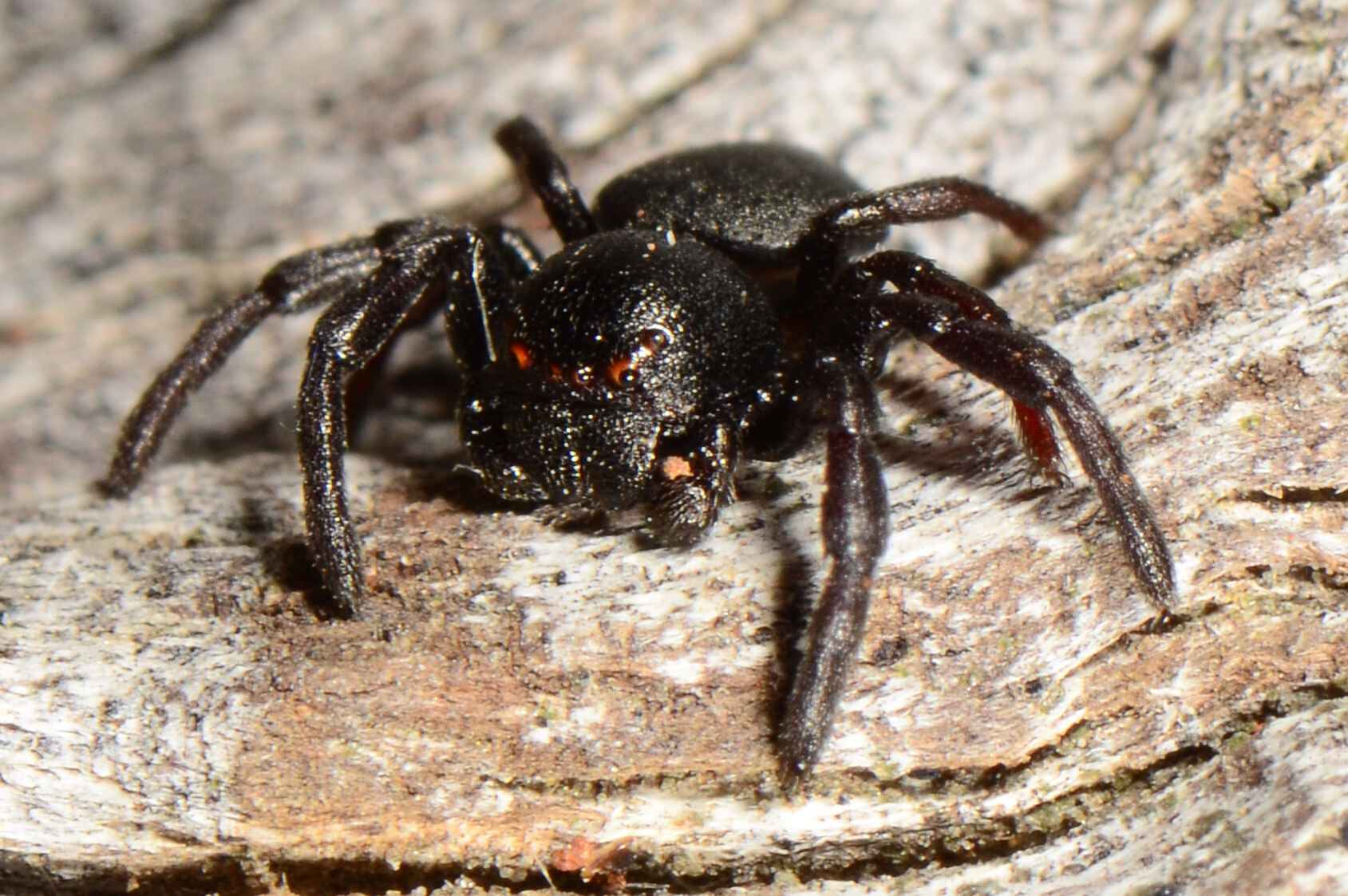
male S. affinis

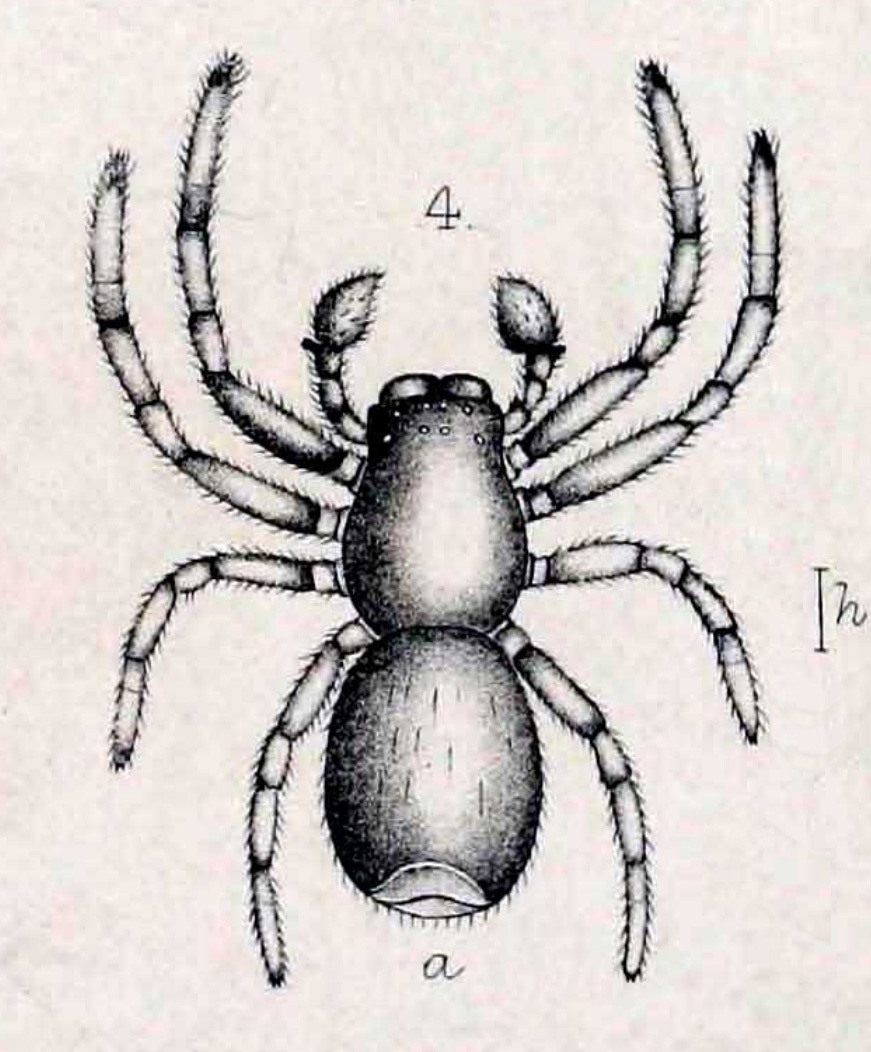
S. drassiformis (1883 drawing)

== Species ==
As of September 2025, this genus includes 22 species:

- Stiphropus affinis Lessert, 1923 – Botswana, South Africa
- Stiphropus bisigillatus Lawrence, 1952 – Zimbabwe, Mozambique, South Africa
- Stiphropus dentifrons Simon, 1895 – Gabon, DR Congo, Equatorial Guinea (Bioko)
- Stiphropus drassiformis (O. Pickard-Cambridge, 1883) – South Africa
- Stiphropus duriusculus (Simon, 1885) – India
- Stiphropus falciformus Yang, Zhu & Song, 2006 – China
- Stiphropus gruberi Ono, 1980 – Indonesia (Sumatra)
- Stiphropus intermedius Millot, 1942 – Ivory Coast, Cameroon, Tanzania, Mozambique, South Africa
- Stiphropus lippulus Simon, 1907 – Guinea-Bissau
- Stiphropus lugubris Gerstaecker, 1873 – East Africa (type species)
- Stiphropus melas Jézéquel, 1966 – Ivory Coast
- Stiphropus minutus Lessert, 1943 – Congo
- Stiphropus monardi Lessert, 1943 – Congo
- Stiphropus myrmecophilus Huang & Lin, 2020 – China
- Stiphropus niger Simon, 1886 – Senegal, Sierra Leone, Ivory Coast, Equatorial Guinea, Gabon
- Stiphropus ocellatus Thorell, 1887 – China, Myanmar, Vietnam
- Stiphropus qianlei Lin & S. Li, 2023 – China
- Stiphropus sangayus Barrion & Litsinger, 1995 – India, Philippines
- Stiphropus scutatus Lawrence, 1927 – Namibia
- Stiphropus sigillatus (O. Pickard-Cambridge, 1883) – Sri Lanka
- Stiphropus soureni Sen, 1964 – India, Nepal, Bhutan, China
- Stiphropus strandi Spassky, 1938 – Iran, Central Asia
