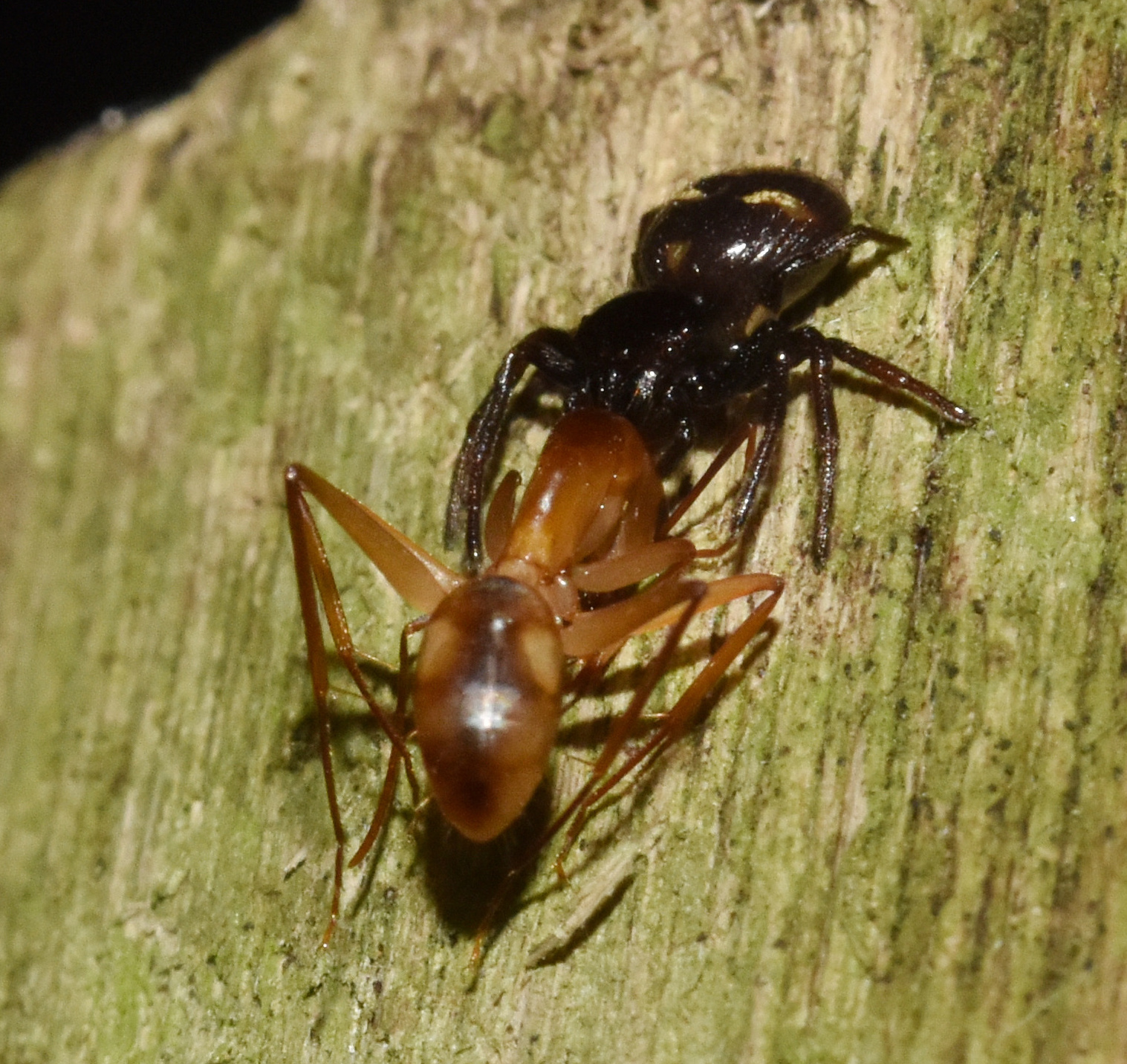
- with ant prey
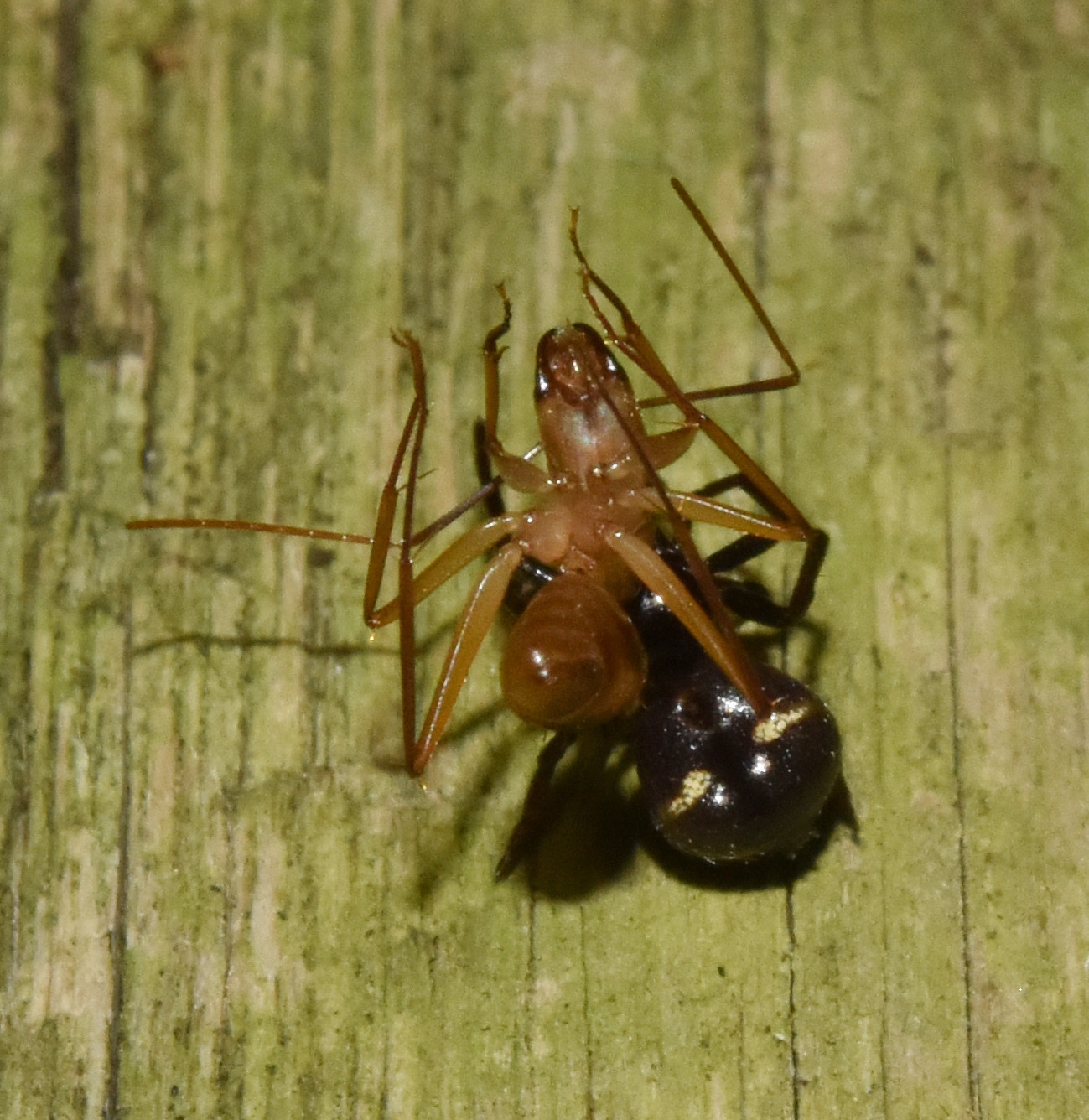

Scientific classification
- Kingdom: Animalia
- Phylum: Arthropoda
- Subphylum: Chelicerata
- Class: Arachnida
- Order: Araneae
- Infraorder: Araneomorphae
- Family: Thomisidae
- Genus: Pactactes
- Species: P. compactus

Binomial name
- Pactactes compactus Lawrence, 1947

= Pactactes compactus =

Species of spider

Pactactes compactus is a spider in the family Thomisidae. It is endemic to South Africa.

== Distribution ==
Pactactes compactus is found only in the South African provinces Eastern Cape, KwaZulu-Natal, Limpopo, and Mpumalanga provinces. The type locality is given only as Zululand.

== Habitat and ecology ==
Pactactes compactus are plant dwellers that were sampled in sweep nets and pitfall traps as well as via canopy fogging from Grassland, Forest, and Savanna biomes at altitudes ranging from 27 to 1411 m.

The species was also sampled from pine plantations.

== Description ==
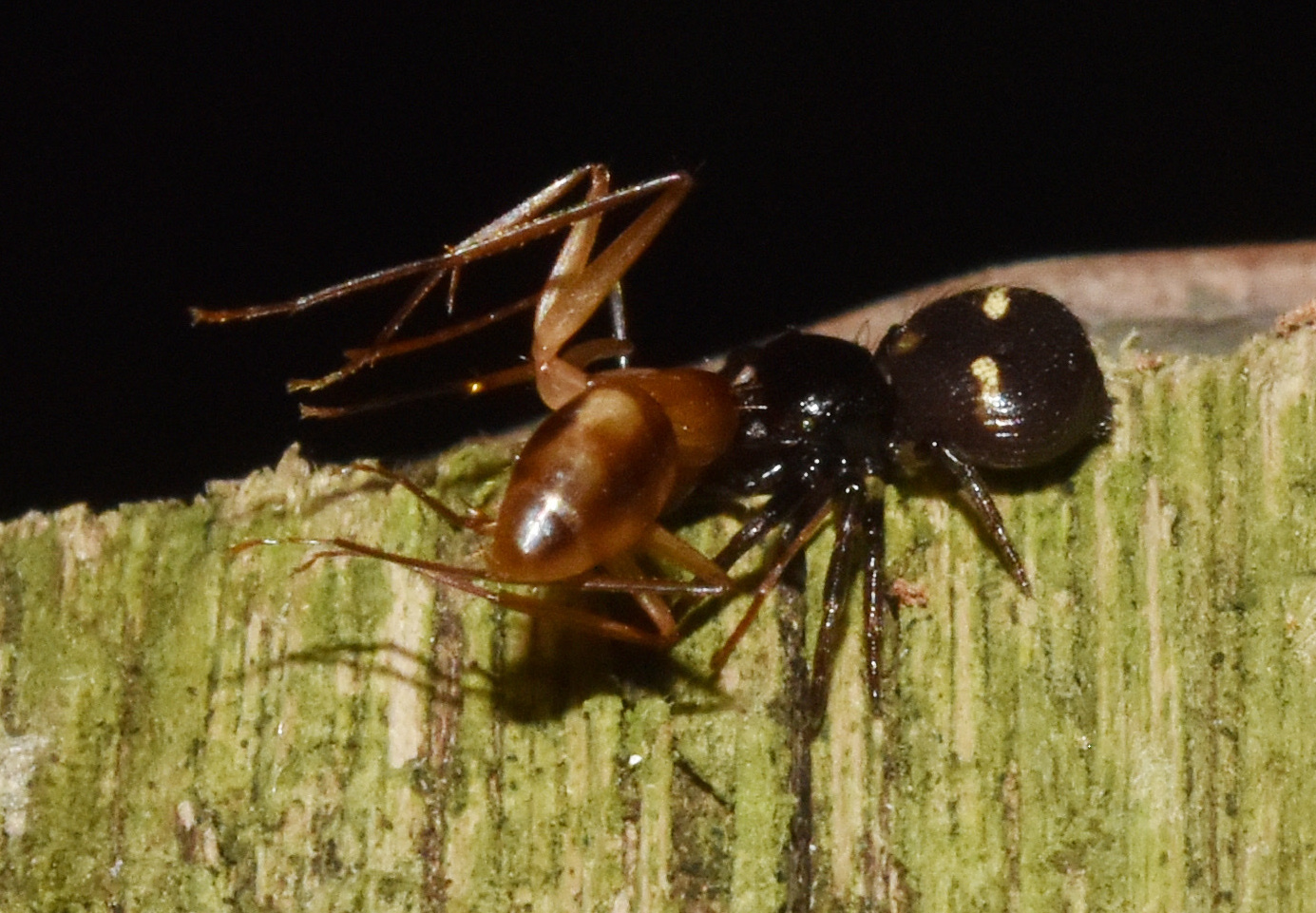

== Conservation ==
Pactactes compactus is listed as Least Concern by the South African National Biodiversity Institute due to its wide geographical range. The species is recorded in reserves such as Addo Elephant Park, Tembe Elephant Park, Nylsvley Nature Reserve, Legalameetse Nature Reserve, and Kruger National Park. There are no significant threats and no conservation actions are recommended.

== Taxonomy ==
Pactactes compactus was described by Lawrence in 1947. The species has not been revised but is known from both sexes.
