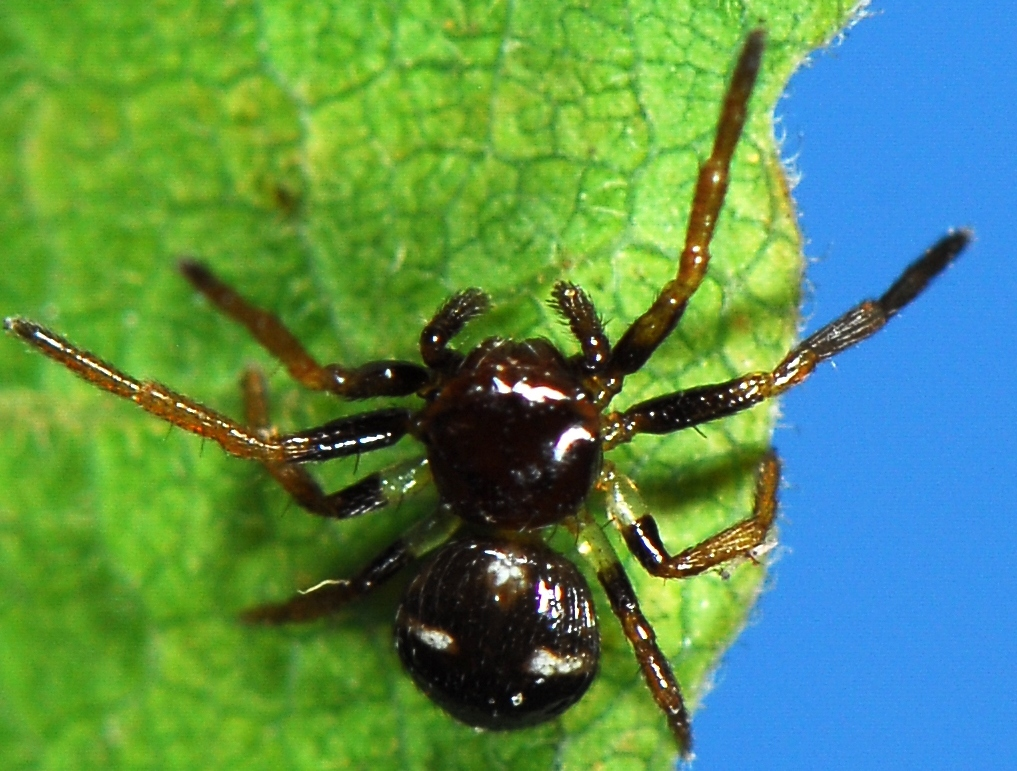
- female P. trimaculatus
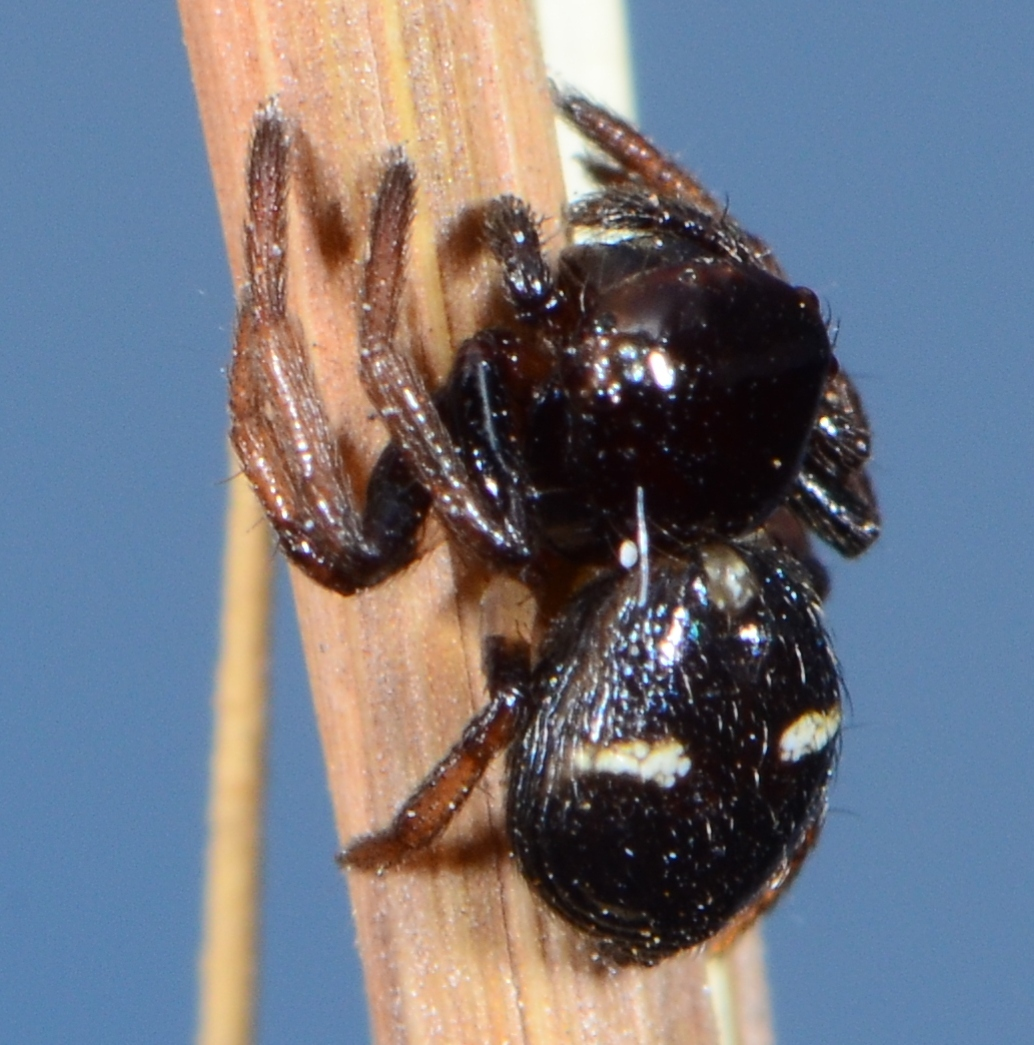
- female P. obesus

Scientific classification
- Kingdom: Animalia
- Phylum: Arthropoda
- Subphylum: Chelicerata
- Class: Arachnida
- Order: Araneae
- Infraorder: Araneomorphae
- Family: Thomisidae
- Genus: Pactactes; Simon

Type species
- Pactactes trimaculatus

Species
- Pactactes compactus Lawrence, 1947; Pactactes obesus Simon, 1895; Pactactes trimaculatus Simon, 1895

= Pactactes =

Genus of spiders

Pactactes is an African genus of spiders in the family Thomisidae, with three species. It was first described in 1895 by Simon.

== Description ==
Pactactes spiders have a dark and shiny carapace with white spots on the abdomen. The carapace is high and slightly flattened dorsally with numerous long setae on the edge of the declivity.

Both eye rows are recurved. The lateral eyes are larger than the median eyes, close to the edge, and sit on a slight tubercle. The posterior median eyes are very small and closer to each other than to the laterals. The anterior medians are closer to each other than to the laterals. The median ocular quadrangle is wider than long and narrower anteriorly.

The abdomen is round with striae around the lateral edge. The legs are almost the same length with slightly thickened tarsi. The legs bear feathered setae.

== Life style ==
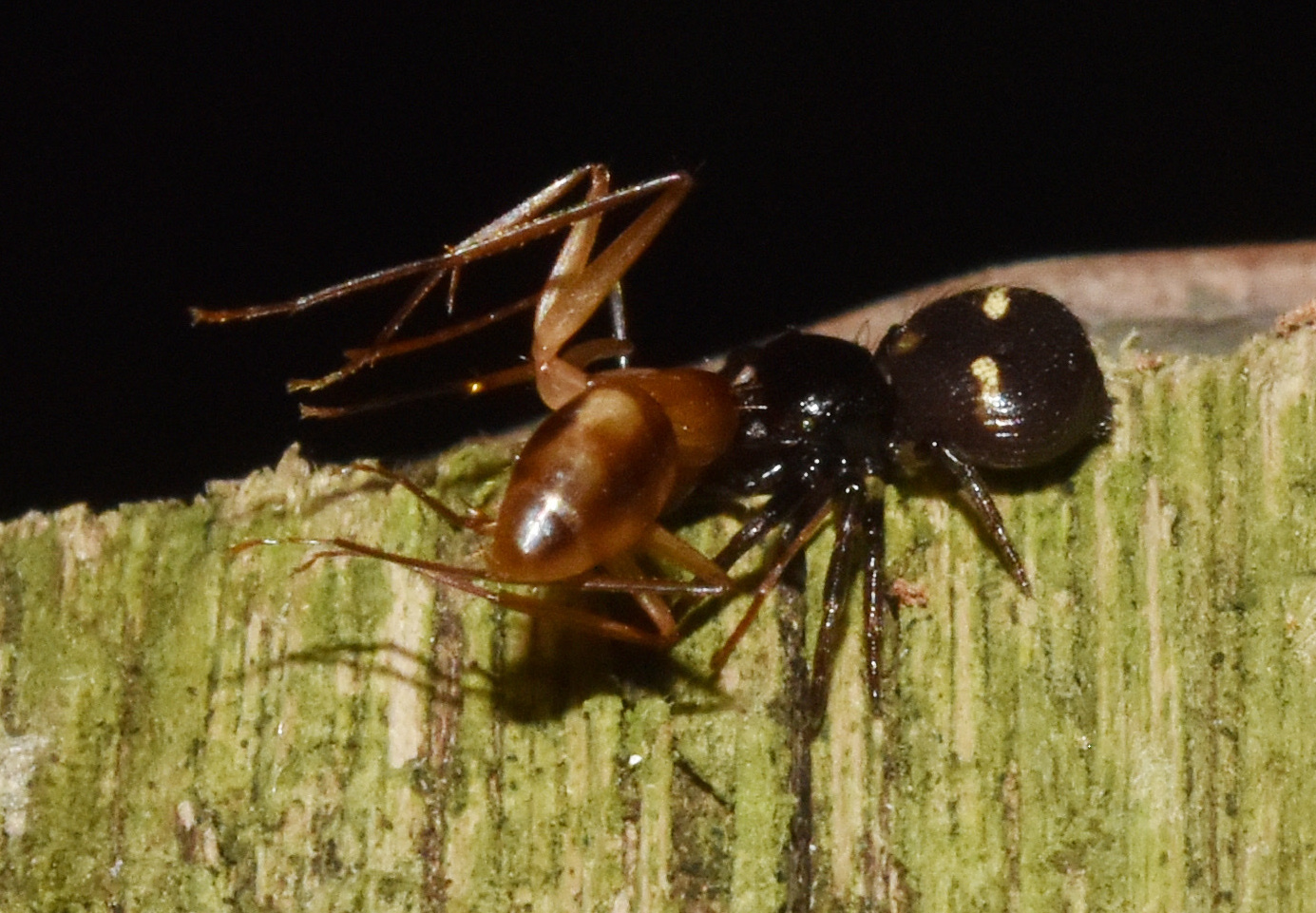
P. compactus with ant prey

Pactactes are rare spiders found on low vegetation.

== Species ==
As of October 2025, this genus includes three species:

- Pactactes compactus Lawrence, 1947 – South Africa
- Pactactes obesus Simon, 1895 – Ivory Coast, Uganda, Kenya, South Africa
- Pactactes trimaculatus Simon, 1895 – Tanzania (Zanzibar), Mozambique, South Africa (type species)
