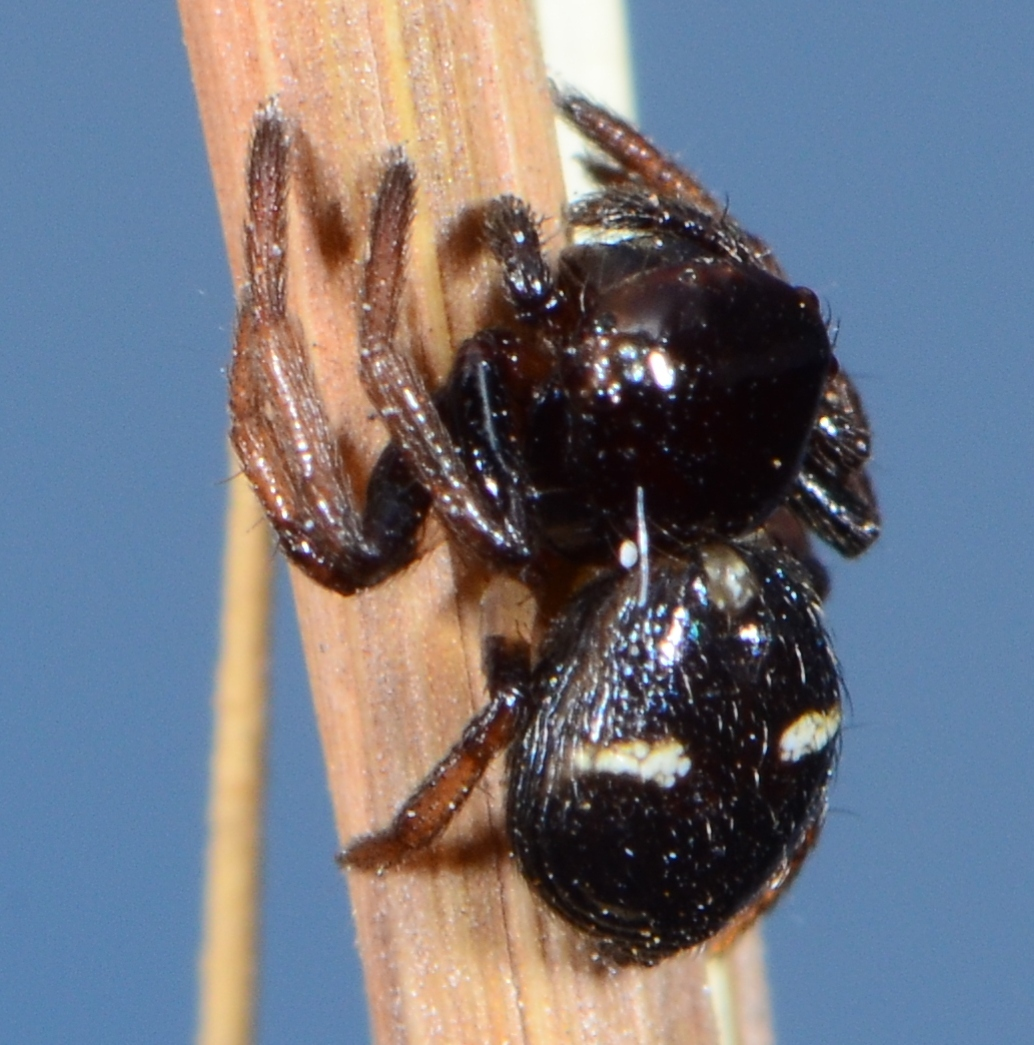
- female
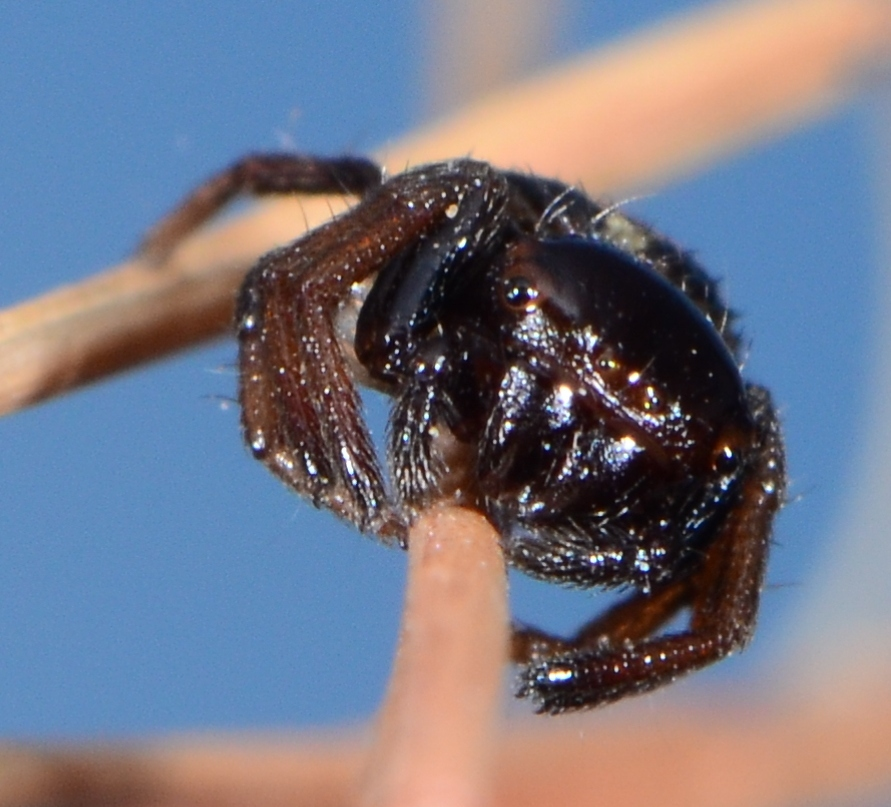
- female

Scientific classification
- Kingdom: Animalia
- Phylum: Arthropoda
- Subphylum: Chelicerata
- Class: Arachnida
- Order: Araneae
- Infraorder: Araneomorphae
- Family: Thomisidae
- Genus: Pactactes
- Species: P. obesus

Binomial name
- Pactactes obesus Simon, 1895

= Pactactes obesus =

Species of spider

Pactactes obesus is an African spider species in the family Thomisidae.

== Distribution ==
Pactactes obesus is found in Kenya, Ivory Coast, Uganda, and South Africa.

In South Africa, it is known from Eastern Cape, KwaZulu-Natal, and Western Cape provinces.

== Habitat and ecology ==
They were sampled in sweep nets and pitfall traps from Fynbos and Savanna biomes at altitudes ranging from 15 to 164 m.

== Description ==
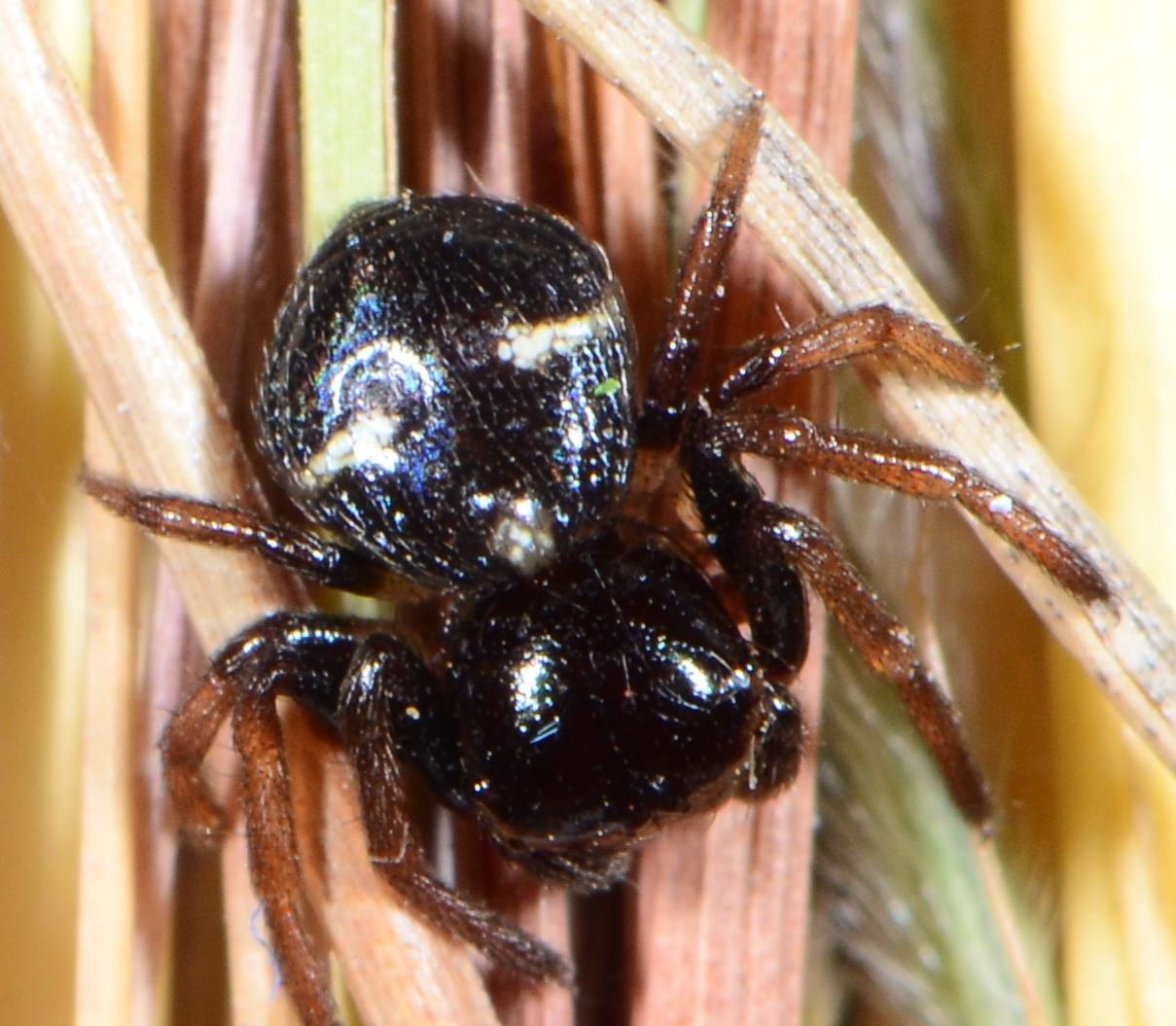
female

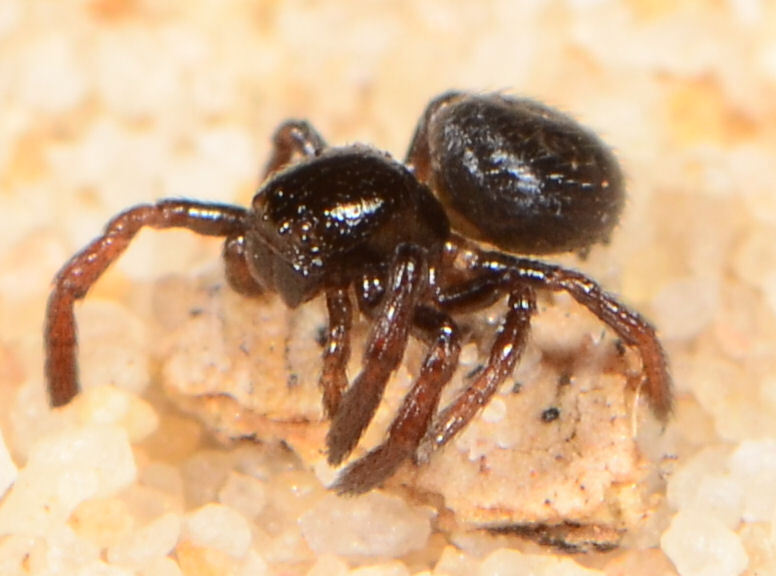
juvenile female

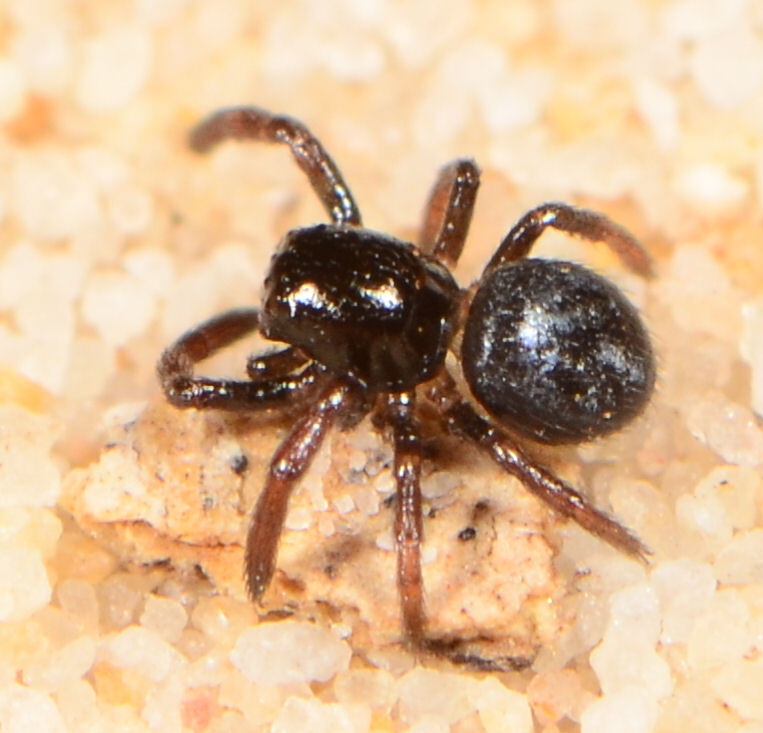
juvenile female

== Conservation ==
Pactactes obesus is listed as Least Concern by the South African National Biodiversity Institute due to its wide geographical range. The species is protected in Tembe Elephant Park, De Hoop Nature Reserve, and Silaka Nature Reserve. There are no significant threats.

== Taxonomy ==
Pactactes obesus was described by Eugène Simon in 1895. The type locality is given only as "Africa trop. Occid" (Western tropical Africa). The species has not been revised but is known from both sexes.
