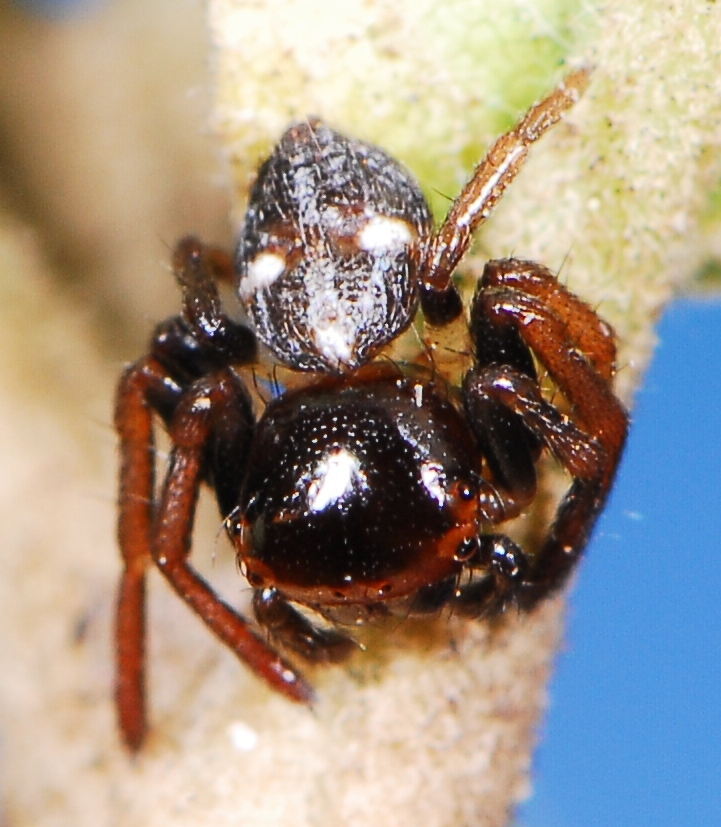
- female
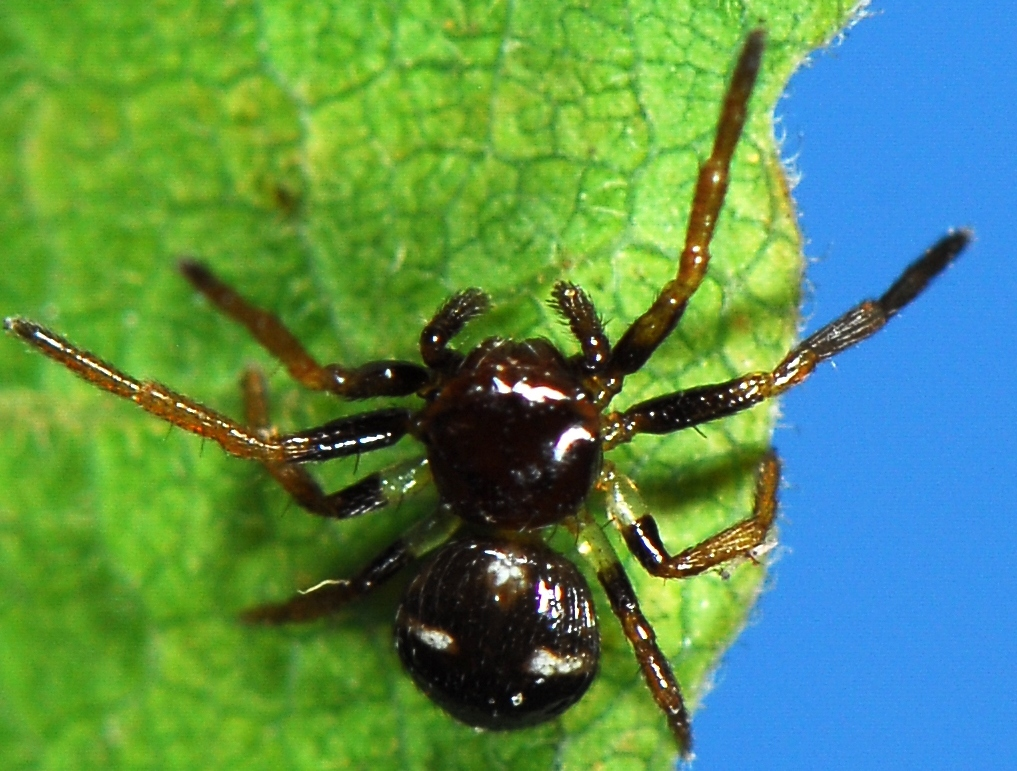
- female

Scientific classification
- Kingdom: Animalia
- Phylum: Arthropoda
- Subphylum: Chelicerata
- Class: Arachnida
- Order: Araneae
- Infraorder: Araneomorphae
- Family: Thomisidae
- Genus: Pactactes
- Species: P. trimaculatus

Binomial name
- Pactactes trimaculatus Simon, 1895

= Pactactes trimaculatus =

Three-spotted Pactates Crab Spider

Species of spider

Pactactes trimaculatus is an African spider species in the family Thomisidae. It is found in Tanzania, Mozambique, and South Africa, and is commonly known as the three-spotted Pactates crab spider.

== Distribution ==
Pactactes trimaculatus is found in Mozambique, Tanzania (Zanzibar), and South Africa.

In South Africa, it has been recorded from Eastern Cape, KwaZulu-Natal, Limpopo, Mpumalanga, and Western Cape provinces.

== Habitat and ecology ==
These are plant dwellers and have been sampled in sweep nets and pitfall traps. The species has been recorded from all the floral biomes except the Indian Ocean Coastal Belt, Nama, and Succulent Karoo biomes at altitudes ranging from 0 to 1310 m.

== Conservation ==
Pactactes trimaculatus is listed as Least Concern by the South African National Biodiversity Institute. Although known from only one sex, due to its wide geographical range, the species is listed as Least Concern. There are no significant threats. The species is recorded in Mkhambathi Nature Reserve, Hluhluwe Nature Reserve, Kosi Bay Nature Reserve, Mkuzi Game Reserve, Sodwana Bay National Park, Tembe Elephant Park, Nylsvley Nature Reserve, and Kruger National Park. No conservation actions are recommended.

== Taxonomy ==
Pactactes trimaculatus was described by Eugène Simon in 1895 from Zanzibar. The species has not been revised and is known from only the male.
