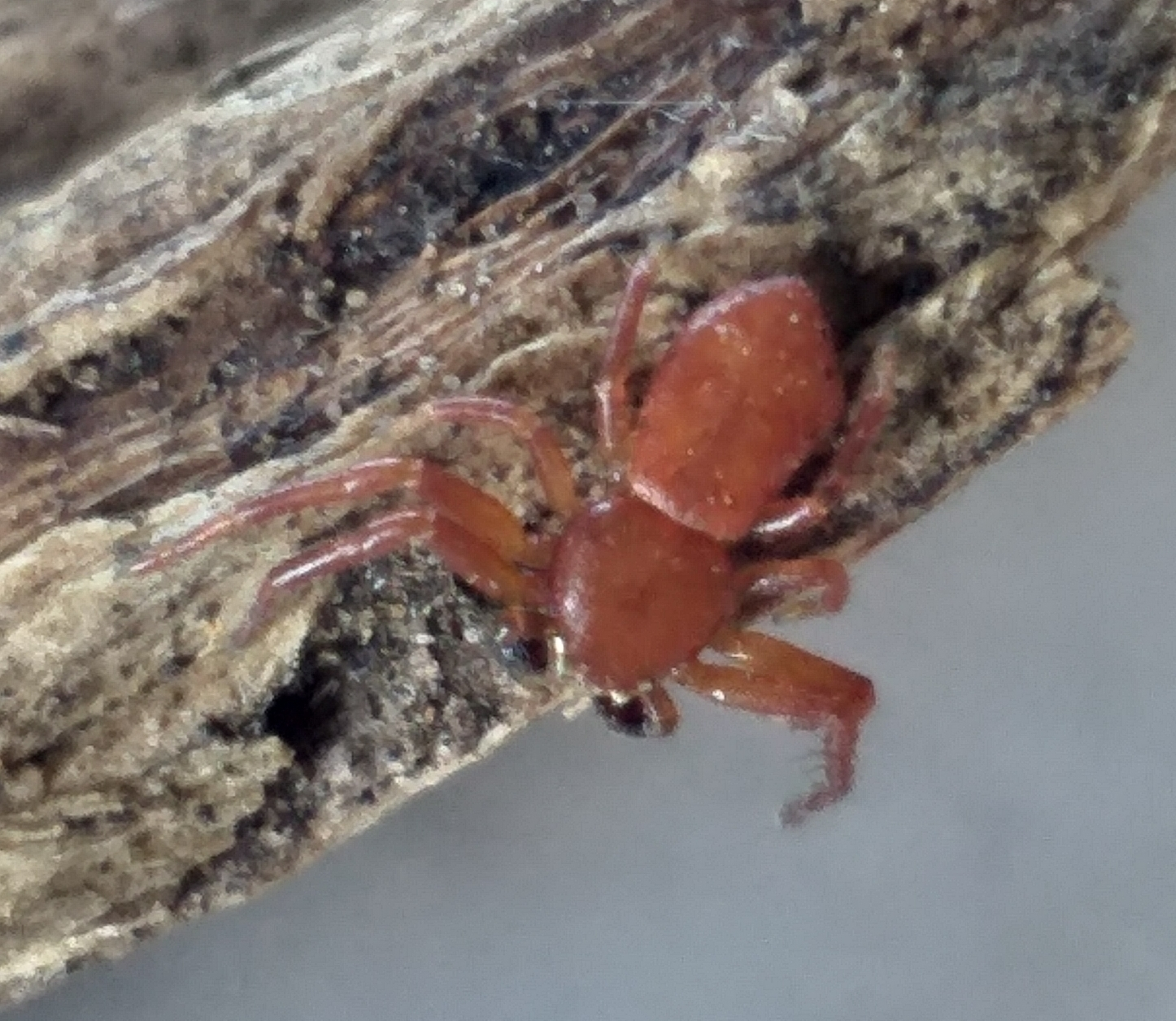

Scientific classification
- Kingdom: Animalia
- Phylum: Arthropoda
- Subphylum: Chelicerata
- Class: Arachnida
- Order: Araneae
- Infraorder: Araneomorphae
- Family: Thomisidae
- Genus: Phaenopoma
- Species: P. nigropunctatum

Binomial name
- Phaenopoma nigropunctatum (O. Pickard-Cambridge, 1883)

Synonyms
- Nesis nigropunctatus O. Pickard-Cambridge, 1883; Phaenopoma nigropunctata Simon, 1895

= Phaenopoma nigropunctatum =

Spotted Phaenopoma Crab Spider

Species of spider

Phaenopoma nigropunctatum is a spider in the family Thomisidae. It is endemic to South Africa and is commonly known as the spotted Phaenopoma crab spider.

== Distribution ==
Phaenopoma nigropunctatum is found in South Africa, where it has been sampled from Eastern Cape, KwaZulu-Natal, Limpopo, and Western Cape provinces. The type locality is given only as Caffraria.

== Habitat and ecology ==
These are plant dwellers and have been sampled from vegetation from the Indian Ocean Coastal Belt, Thicket, and Savanna biomes at altitudes ranging from 10 to 1307 m.

== Conservation ==
Phaenopoma nigropunctatum is listed as Least Concern by the South African National Biodiversity Institute due to its wide geographical range. The species is recorded in four reserves. There are no significant threats and no conservation actions are recommended.

== Taxonomy ==
Phaenopoma nigropunctatum was originally described by Octavius Pickard-Cambridge in 1883 as Nesis nigropunctatus. The species has not been revised and is known only from the male.
