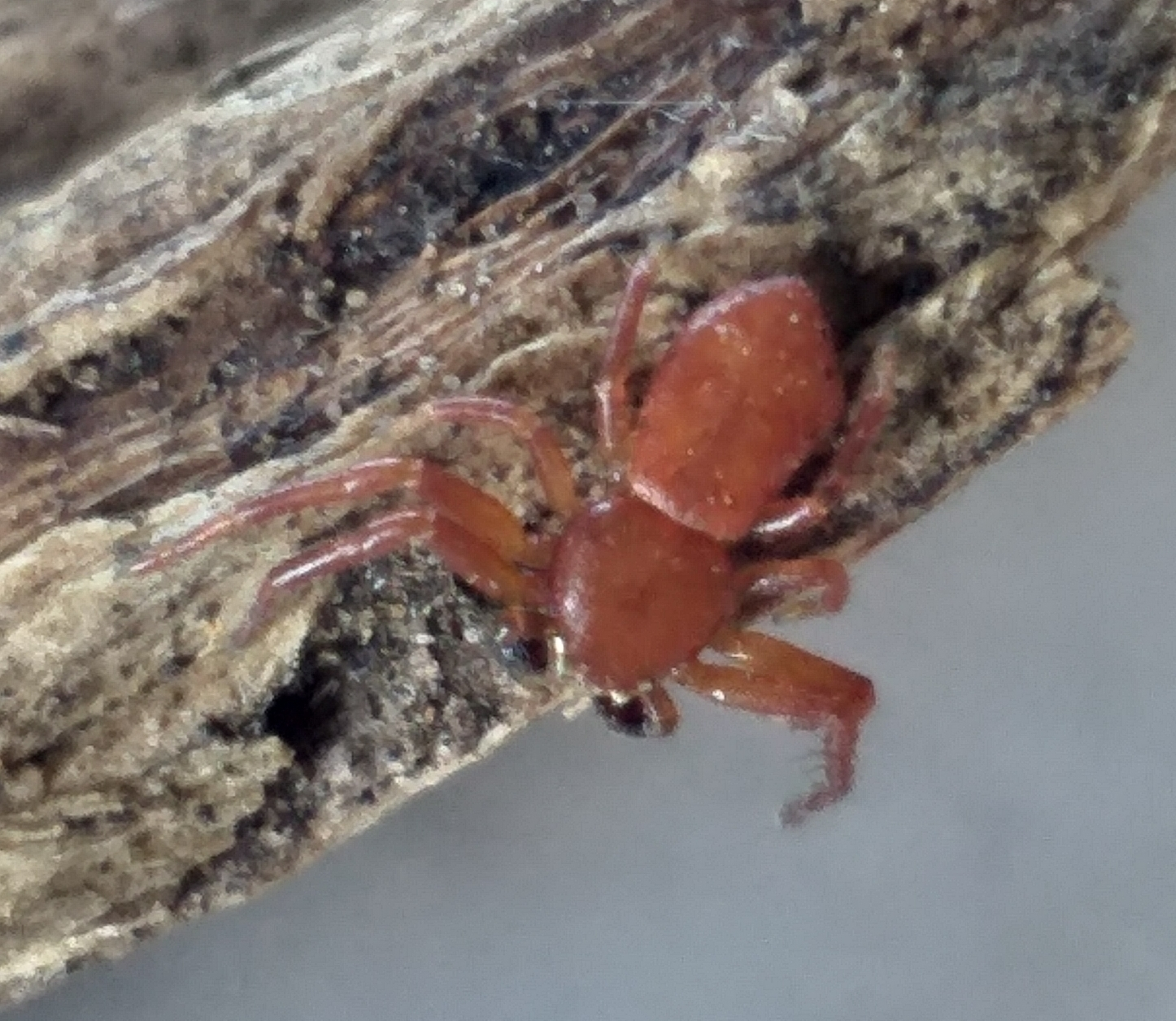
- P. nigropunctatum

Scientific classification
- Kingdom: Animalia
- Phylum: Arthropoda
- Subphylum: Chelicerata
- Class: Arachnida
- Order: Araneae
- Infraorder: Araneomorphae
- Family: Thomisidae
- Genus: Phaenopoma; Simon

Type species
- Phaenopoma nigropunctatum

Species
- Phaenopoma milloti Roewer, 1961; Phaenopoma nigropunctatum (O. Pickard-Cambridge, 1883); Phaenopoma planum Simon, 1895

= Phaenopoma =

Genus of spiders

Phaenopoma is an African genus of spiders in the family Thomisidae, with three species. It was first described in 1895 by Eugène Simon.

== Description ==
The carapace of Phaenopoma is as long as wide, truncated in front, and constricted laterally at the margins. The upper surface is flat and level.

The eyes are small and slightly different in size, though the four centrals are distinctly smallest. They are seated on separate tubercles, of a greyish hue, and occupy the whole width of the fore part of the caput. The height of the clypeus is less than the diameter of one of the fore-central eyes. The maxillae are long and enlarged at the extremities where they are obliquely and slightly roundly truncated on the outer side. The labium is rather more than half the length of the maxillae, constricted laterally near the middle, and somewhat pointed at the apex. The sternum is oval, truncated before and pointed behind.

The abdomen is somewhat oblong, truncated before and pointed behind, and very flat. The legs are moderate in length and strength. Those of the first and second pairs are much the longest. The second pair slightly exceed the first, and the third pair are rather shorter than the fourth. A few regularly disposed slender spines occur beneath the tibiae and metatarsi of the first and second pairs. Beneath the tarsal claws is a small claw tuft.

== Life style ==
Phaenopoma are free-living plant dwellers.

== Species ==
As of October 2025, this genus includes three species:

- Phaenopoma milloti Roewer, 1961 – Senegal
- Phaenopoma nigropunctatum (O. Pickard-Cambridge, 1883) – South Africa (type species)
- Phaenopoma planum Simon, 1895 – Sierra Leone
