= Corynethrix =

Scientific classification
- Kingdom: Animalia
- Phylum: Arthropoda
- Subphylum: Chelicerata
- Class: Arachnida
- Order: Araneae
- Infraorder: Araneomorphae
- Family: Thomisidae
- Genus: Corynethrix; L. Koch, 1876
- Species: C. obscura

Binomial name
- Corynethrix obscura L. Koch, 1876

Monotypic genus of spiders

Corynethrix is a monotypic genus of South Pacific crab spiders containing the single species, Corynethrix obscura. It was first described by Ludwig Carl Christian Koch in 1876 based on a female specimen. They have been found in New South Wales and Queensland. A male has not yet been identified, and there is very little known about the biology and behaviour of this species and its relatives.

The original description lacks many of the morphological details helpful for identification, though it is similar to other members of the Bominae subfamily, including Boliscus and Bomis. Eugène Simon described a second species C. tuberculata in 1886, but it was later made the type species of Boliscus.

== See also ==
- List of Thomisidae species
