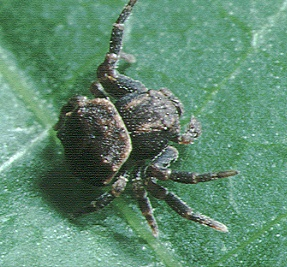
- B. tuberculatus, male
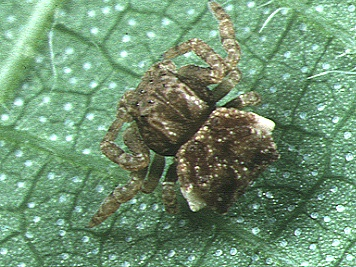
- B. tuberculatus, female

Scientific classification
- Kingdom: Animalia
- Phylum: Arthropoda
- Subphylum: Chelicerata
- Class: Arachnida
- Order: Araneae
- Infraorder: Araneomorphae
- Family: Thomisidae
- Genus: Boliscus; Thorell, 1891

Type species
- B. tuberculatus (Simon, 1886)

Species
- B. decipiens O. Pickard-Cambridge, 1899 – Sri Lanka; B. duricorius (Simon, 1880) – New Caledonia; B. tuberculatus (Simon, 1886) – Myanmar, Thailand, Malaysia, Singapore, Indonesia, Vietnam, China, Taiwan, Japan

Synonyms
- Boliscodes Simon, 1909

= Boliscus =

Genus of spiders

Boliscus is a genus of Asian crab spiders first described by Tamerlan Thorell in 1891. As of February 2019 it contains only three species.

B. tuberculatus is the most studied and well known of the three. The other two, B. duricorius and B. decipiens, are only known from females found by Eugène Simon in 1880 and Octavius Pickard-Cambridge in 1899, respectively. In his 2016 publication in the Indian Journal of Arachnology, Pekka T. Lehtinen commented that this genus and its close relatives, including Corynethrix and possibly Boliscodes, need a taxonomic revision with the help of molecular analysis and that the absence of male specimens in two of the three species may make this difficult.

== See also ==
- List of Thomisidae species
