= Boliscus decipiens =

Scientific classification
- Kingdom: Animalia
- Phylum: Arthropoda
- Subphylum: Chelicerata
- Class: Arachnida
- Order: Araneae
- Infraorder: Araneomorphae
- Family: Thomisidae
- Genus: Boliscus
- Species: B. decipiens

Binomial name
- Boliscus decipiens O. Pickard-Cambridge, 1899

Species of spider

Boliscus decipiens is a species of spiders of the genus Boliscus. It is endemic to Sri Lanka.

== See also ==
- List of Thomisidae species
