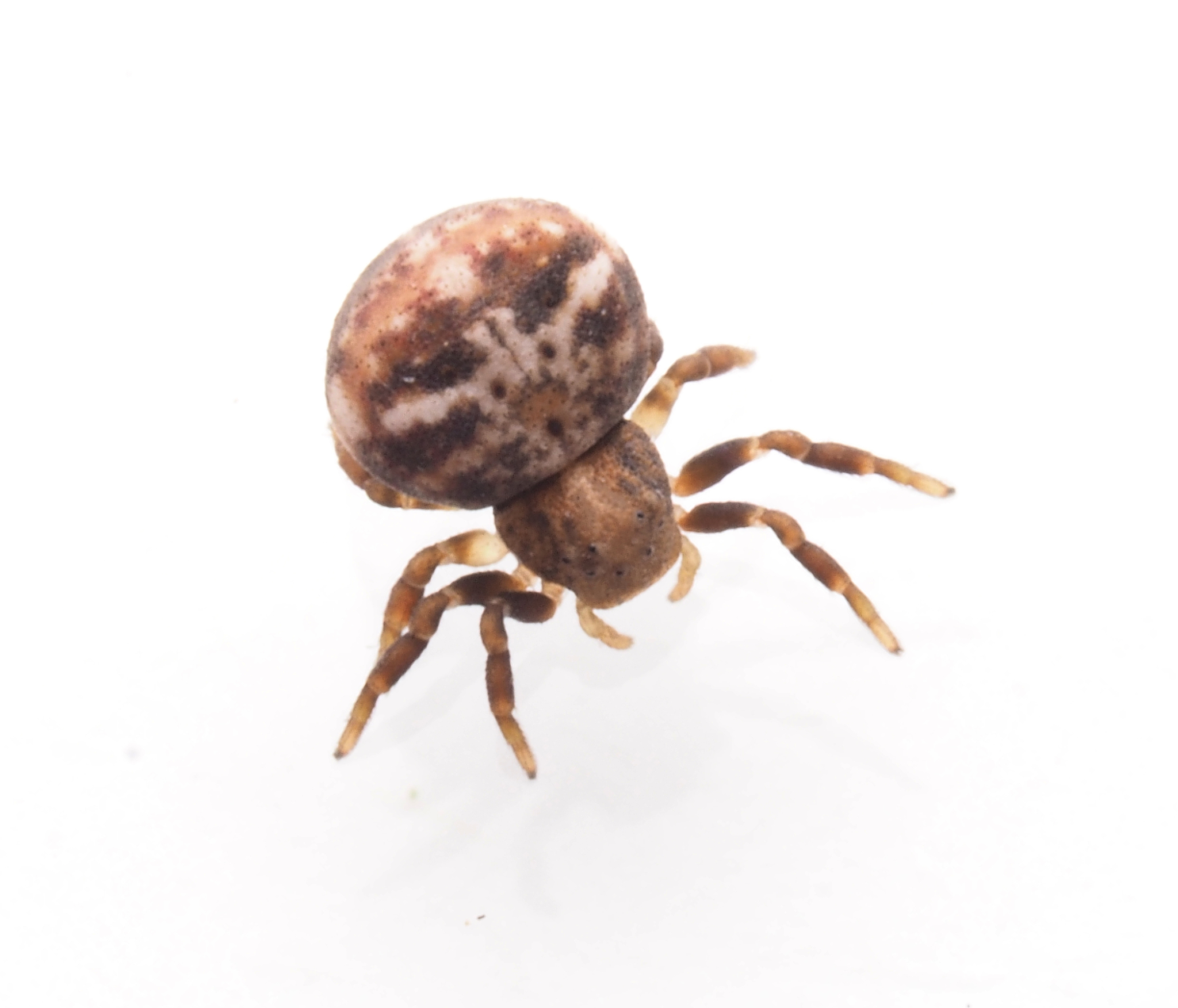
- B. larvata photographed in Brisbane, Australia

Scientific classification
- Kingdom: Animalia
- Phylum: Arthropoda
- Subphylum: Chelicerata
- Class: Arachnida
- Order: Araneae
- Infraorder: Araneomorphae
- Family: Thomisidae
- Genus: Bomis; L. Koch, 1874

Type species
- B. larvata L. Koch, 1874

Species
- 5, see text

= Bomis (spider) =

Genus of spiders

Bomis is a genus of very small crab spiders, first described by German arachnologist Ludwig Carl Christian Koch in 1874. Five species are currently described, with three species from India and two from Australia.

== Description ==
All Bomis species are extremely small, with females measuring approximately 3.5 mm (0.14 in) long and males only 2.5 mm (0.098 in) long. The prosoma is roughly textured and noticeably convex, while the opisthosoma is wrinkled and often forms folds on its lateral and anterior surfaces. The legs are short and thick, and the entire body has a sparse covering of very short setae.

== Species ==
This genus includes the following species:

- Bomis bengalensis Tikader, 1962 – India
- Bomis calcuttaensis Biswas & Mazumder, 1981 – India
- Bomis hippoponoi Szymkowiak, 2017 – Australia (South Australia, Queensland, New South Wales)
- Bomis khajuriai Tikader, 1980 – India
- Bomis larvata L. Koch, 1874 (type) – Australia (Western Australia, Queensland, New South Wales)

== See also ==
- List of Thomisidae species
