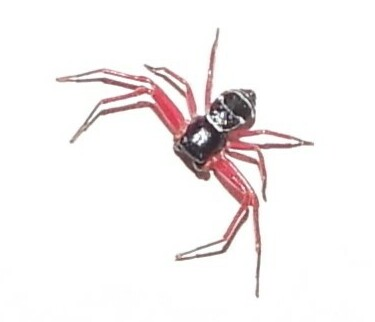
- C. bicolor

Scientific classification
- Kingdom: Animalia
- Phylum: Arthropoda
- Subphylum: Chelicerata
- Class: Arachnida
- Order: Araneae
- Infraorder: Araneomorphae
- Family: Thomisidae
- Genus: Cynathea; Simon, 1895

Type species
- C. obliterata Simon, 1895

Species
- C. bicolor Simon, 1895 – West Africa; C. mechowi (Karsch, 1881) – Angola; C. obliterata Simon, 1895 – Gabon

= Cynathea =

Genus of spiders

Cynathea is a genus of African crab spiders that was first described by Eugène Louis Simon in 1895, with three species.

== Life style ==
Spiders in this genus are found on vegetation, usually in grass and in the herb layer.

== Description ==
Females and males are 3 to 4 mm in total length, with males smaller than females.

The carapace is shiny and dark in colour, longer than wide and slightly flattened. It is distinctly narrower in the eye region. The eyes are not on tubercles. The anterior eye row is either straight or slightly recurved while the posterior row is recurved. Lateral eyes are larger than median eyes, with anterior lateral eyes being largest and posterior median eyes smallest. The median eyes are much further from each other than from lateral eyes. The clypeus is narrow.

The abdomen is distinct with a colourful abdominal pattern. The legs are pale, long and fairly slender, with legs I and II longer than III and IV. They are decorated with dark longitudinal bands. The patella is shorter than the tibia or metatarsus. Macro-setae on legs are not very distinct and body setae are simple and not branched.

== Species ==
As of October 2025, this genus includes three species:

- Cynathea bicolor Simon, 1895 – Senegal, Nigeria, Gabon, Angola, Malawi, Zimbabwe, Mozambique, South Africa
- Cynathea mechowi (Karsch, 1881) – Angola
- Cynathea obliterata Simon, 1895 – Gabon (type species)
