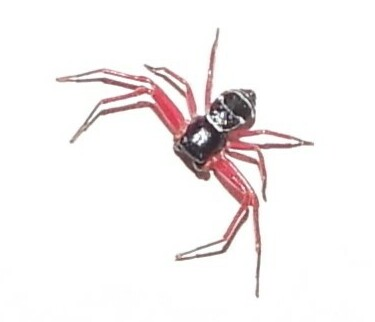

Scientific classification
- Kingdom: Animalia
- Phylum: Arthropoda
- Subphylum: Chelicerata
- Class: Arachnida
- Order: Araneae
- Infraorder: Araneomorphae
- Family: Thomisidae
- Genus: Cynathea
- Species: C. bicolor

Binomial name
- Cynathea bicolor Simon, 1895

= Cynathea bicolor =

Cynathea crab spider

Species of spider

Cynathea bicolor is a species of spider in the family Thomisidae. It is found in several African countries and is commonly known as Cynathea crab spider.

== Distribution ==
Cynathea bicolor is found in Senegal, Nigeria, Gabon, Angola, Malawi, Zimbabwe, Mozambique, and South Africa.

In South Africa, the species is not very common and was only sampled from Eastern Cape and KwaZulu-Natal.

== Habitat and ecology ==
Cynathea bicolor inhabits the Indian Ocean Coastal Belt and Savanna biomes at altitudes ranging from 78 to 1163 m above sea level.

They are free-living plant dwellers, found on shrubs and grasses.

== Conservation ==
Cynathea bicolor is listed as Least Concern by the South African National Biodiversity Institute due to its wide range. It is protected in Tembe Elephant Park.

== Etymology ==
The species epithet bicolor means "two-colored" in Latin.

== Taxonomy ==
Cynathea bicolor was described by Eugène Simon in 1895 from Senegal. The species is known only from the male.
