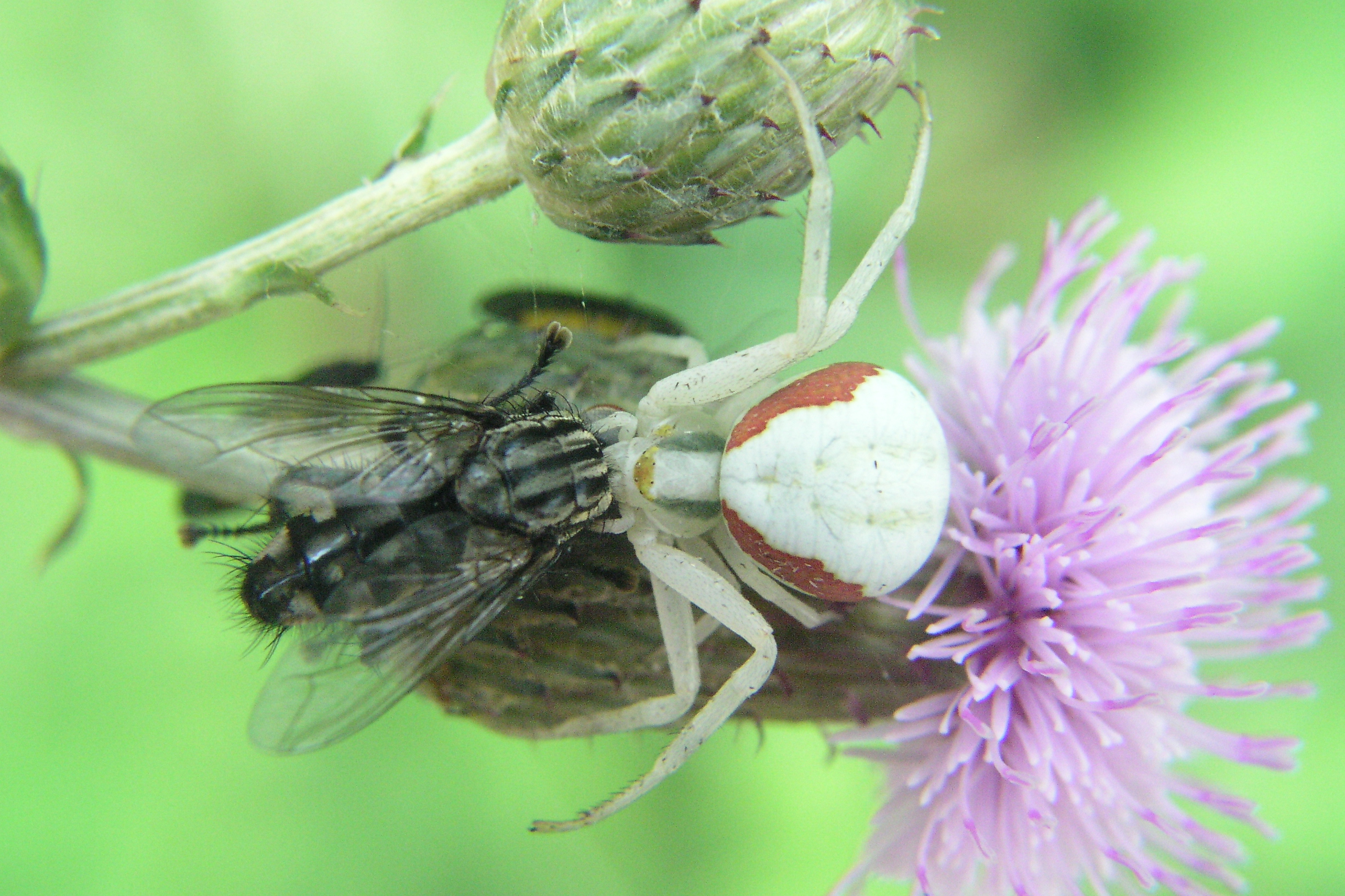
- Misumena vatia with fly

Scientific classification
- Domain: Eukaryota
- Kingdom: Animalia
- Phylum: Arthropoda
- Subphylum: Chelicerata
- Class: Arachnida
- Order: Araneae
- Infraorder: Araneomorphae
- Family: Thomisidae
- Subfamily: Thomisinae
- Tribe: Misumenini; Dahl, 1913

Genera
- See text.

= Misumenini =

Tribe of spiders

Misumenini is a tribe of spiders in the family Thomisidae (crab spiders).

== Description ==
The tribe Misumenini belongs to the crab spider family, Thomisidae. As circumscribed by Lehtinen, typical members of the tribe Misumenini have a greenish body and legs (in fresh specimens), and a relatively uncomplicated colour pattern. They have a more-or-less unmodified carapace with only rarely any modifications to the abdomen. Adult males and females are distinctly different. Males have palpal tibia with three separate and distinguishable processes (tibial apophyses) (retrolateral, intermediate and ventral). Females have a more-or-less distinct hood to the epigyne, as well as large spermathecae typical of other members of the subfamily Thomisinae. Some members of the tribe can change body colour in the green-yellow-grey-white range to match the colour of the flower on which they are resting.

== Genera ==
In 2004, Pekka T. Lehtinen included the following 19 genera:

- Ansiea Lehtinen, 2004 – Afrotropical
- Cyriogonus Simon, 1886 – Madagascar
- Ebelingia Lehtinen, 2004 – Oriental, east Palaearctic
- Ebrechtella Dahl, 1907 – Oriental, Palaearctic
- Erissoides Mello-Leitão, 1929 – Neotropical
- Henriksenia Lehtinen, 2004 – Oriental, Melanesia
- Ledouxia Lehtinen, 2004 – Madagascar, Mascarene Islands
- Loxoporetes Kulczyñski, 1911 – Oriental, Australian
- Mastira Thorell, 1891 – Oriental
- Mecaphesa Simon, 1903 – Hawaii, other Pacific islands
- Metadiaea Mello-Leitão, 1929 – Neotropical
- Misumena Latreille, 1804 – Palaearctic
- Misumenoides F.O. Pickard-Cambridge, 1900 – Nearctic, Neotropical
- Misumenops F.O. Pickard-Cambridge, 1900 – Nearctic, Neotropical
- Pistius Simon, 1875 – Palaearctic
- Runcinia Simon, 1875 – Palaearctic, Old World tropical
- Runcinioides Mello-Leitão, 1929 – Neotropical
- Uraarachne Keyserling, 1880 – Neotropical
- Zygometis Simon, 1901 – Oriental, Australian
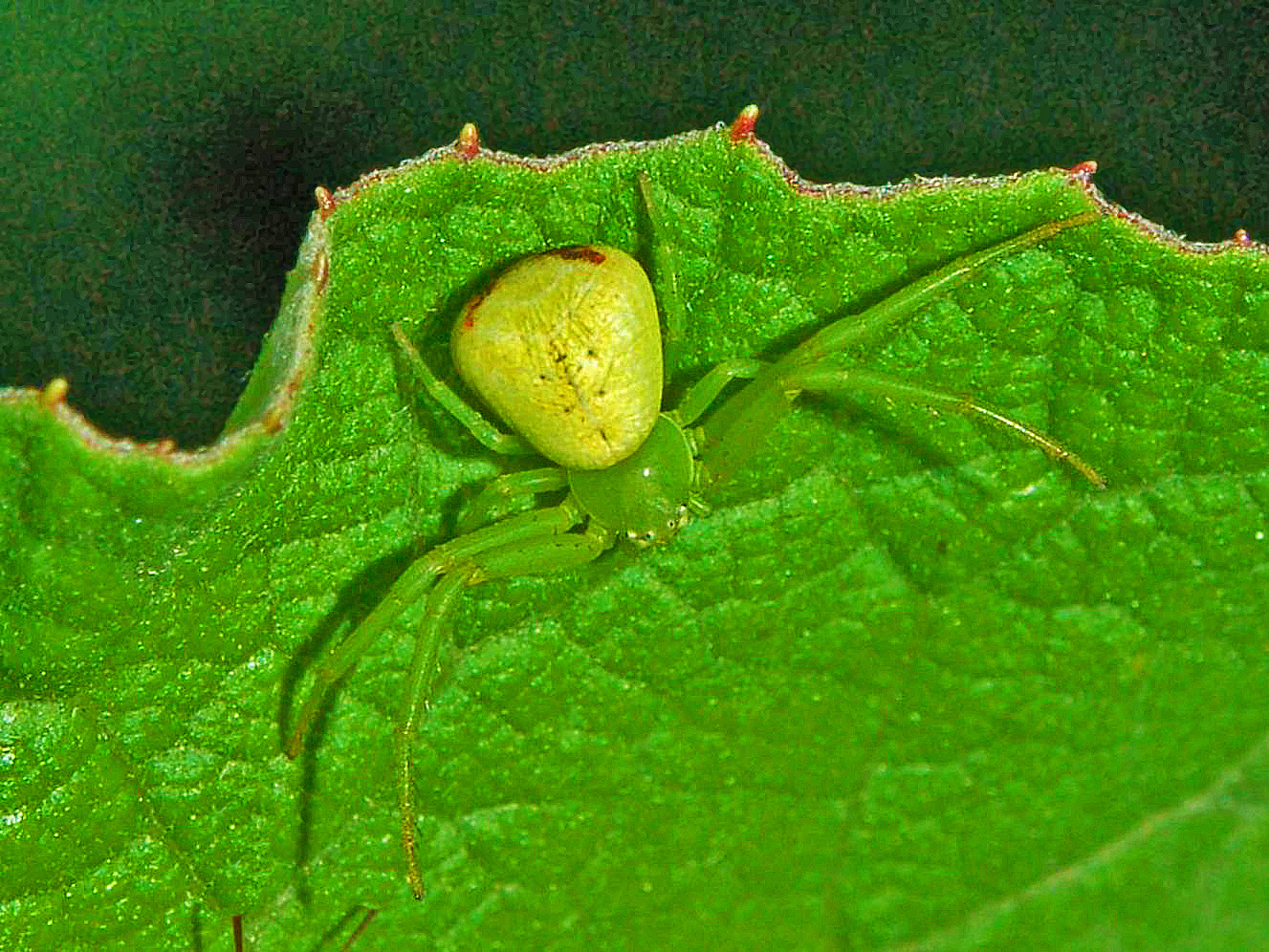
Ebrechtella tricuspidata

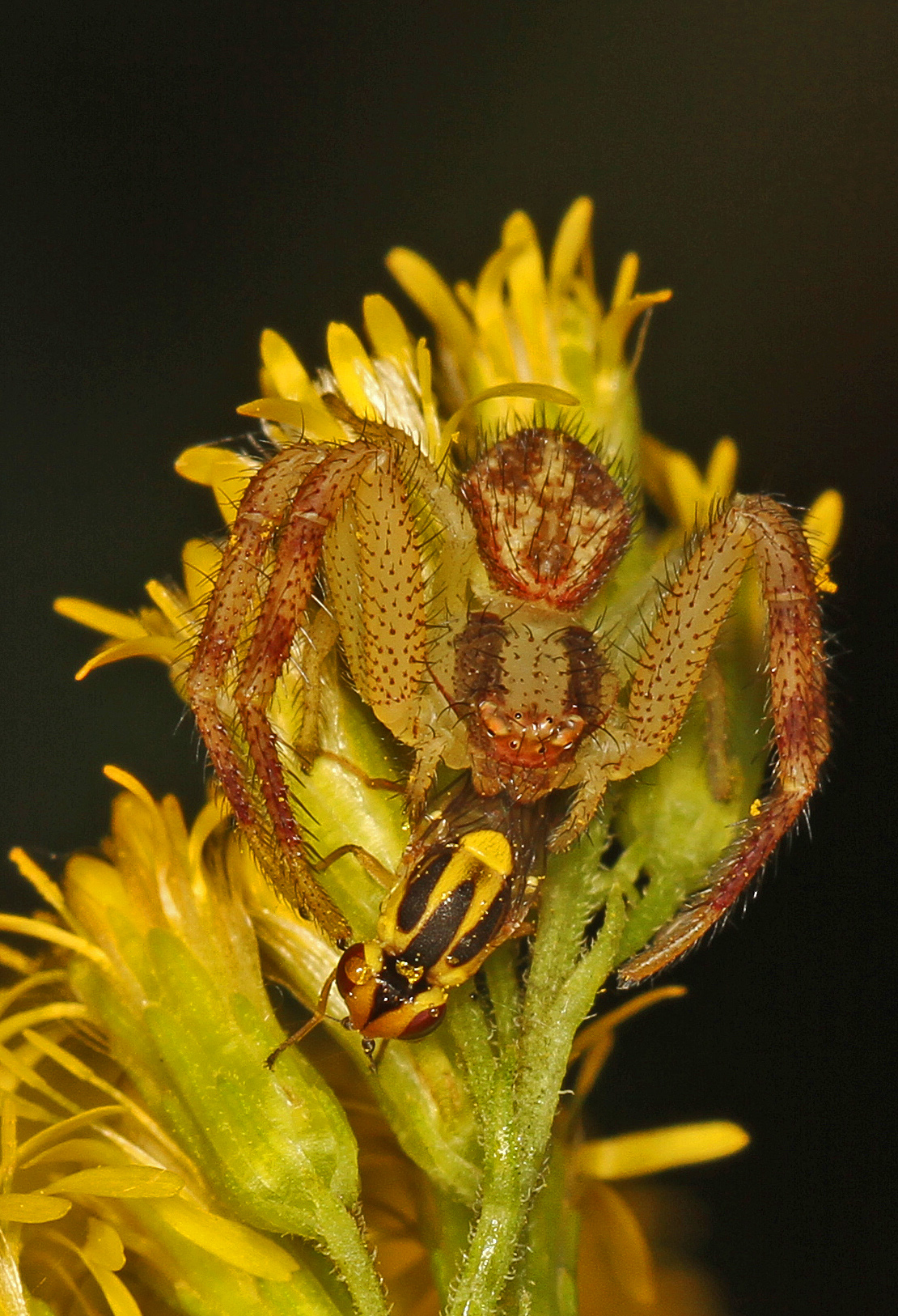
Mecaphesa asperata

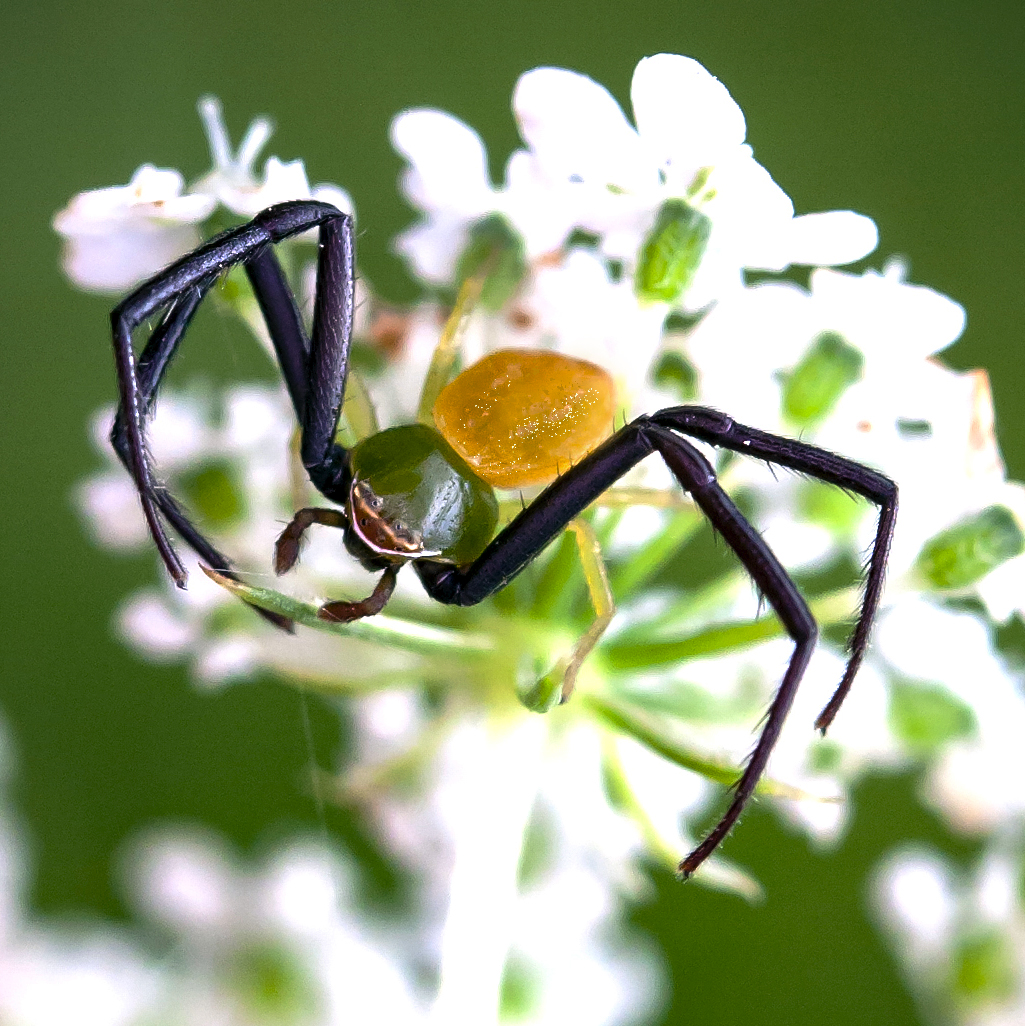
Male Misumenoides formosipes

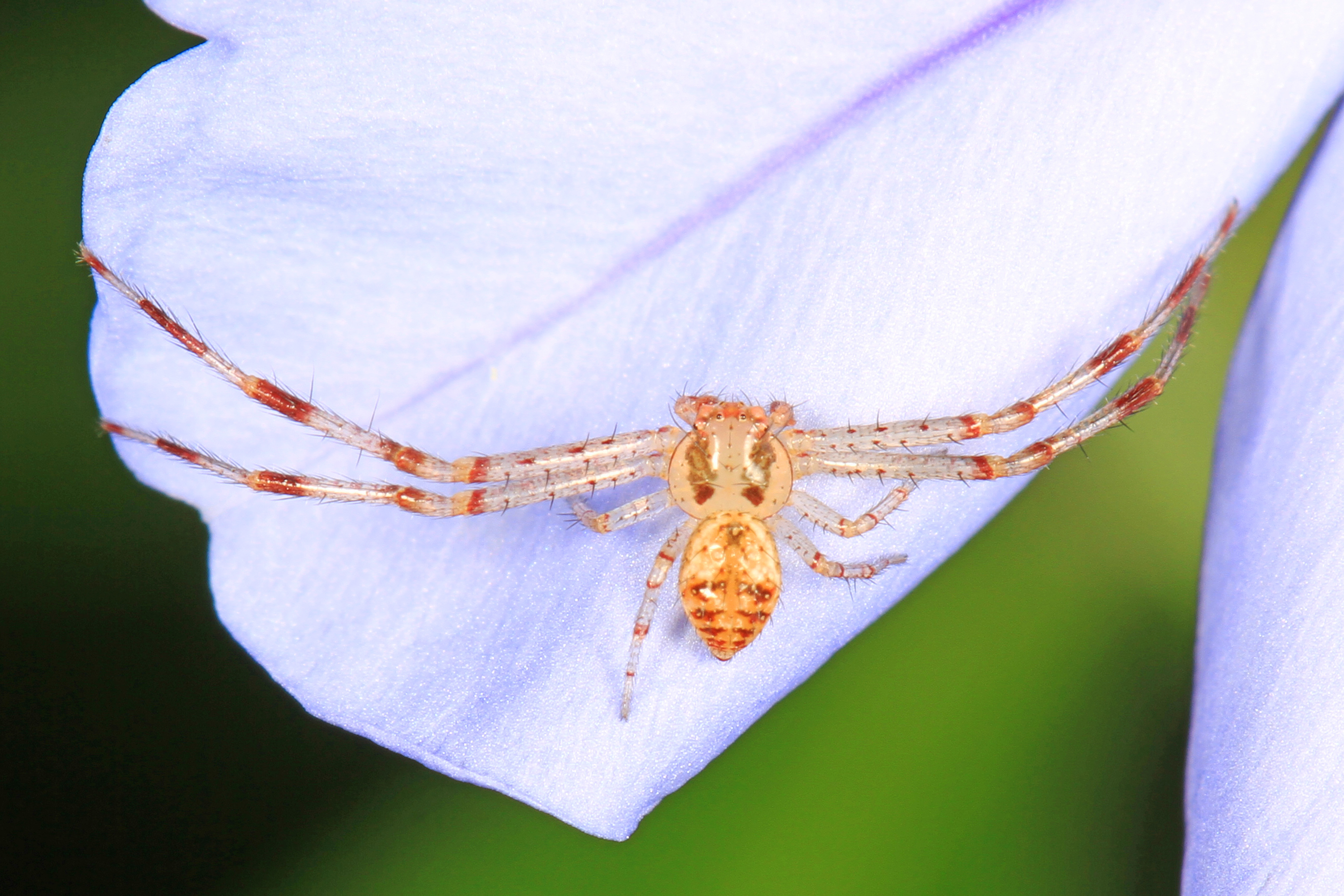
Misumenops bellulus

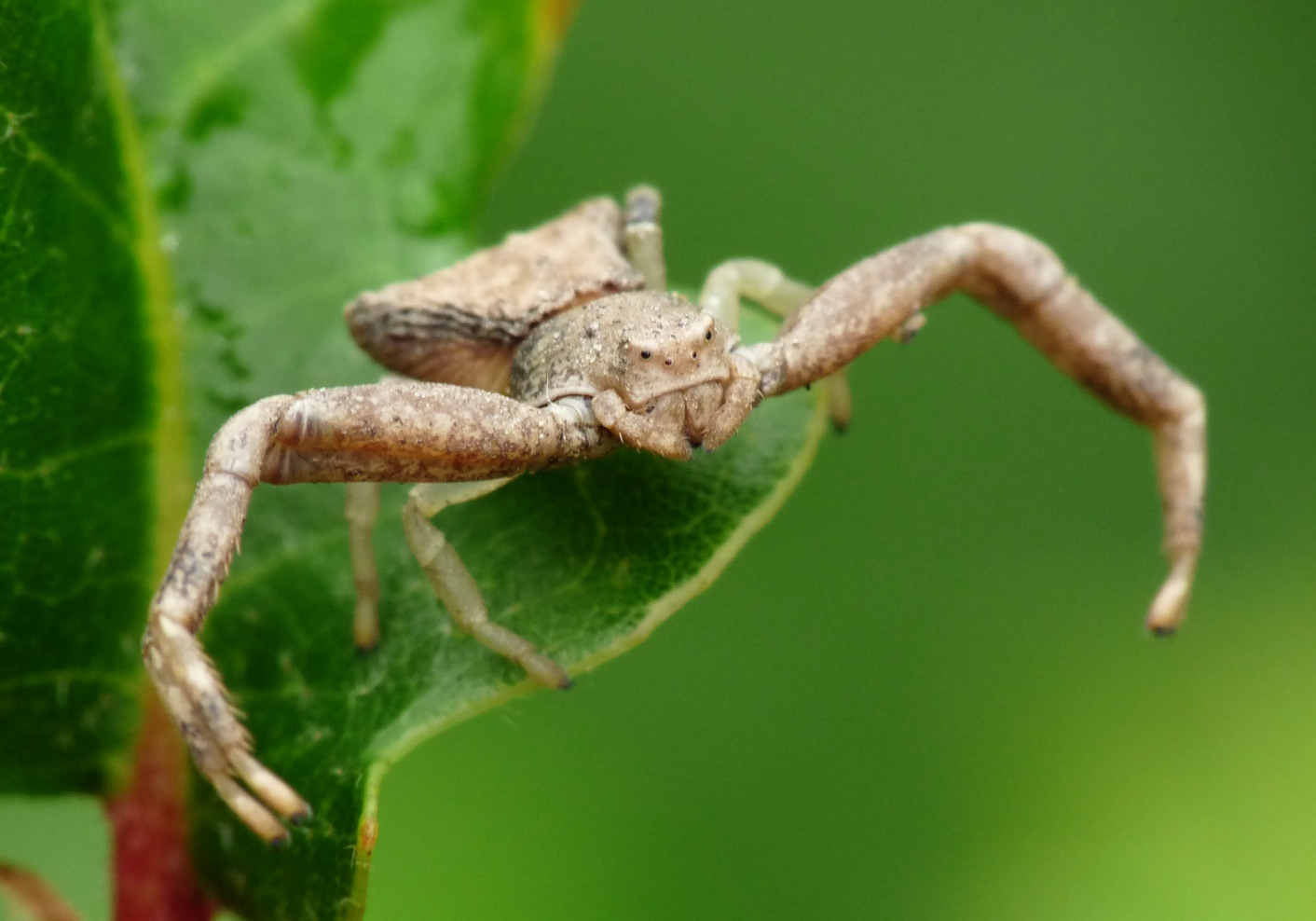
Pistius truncatus

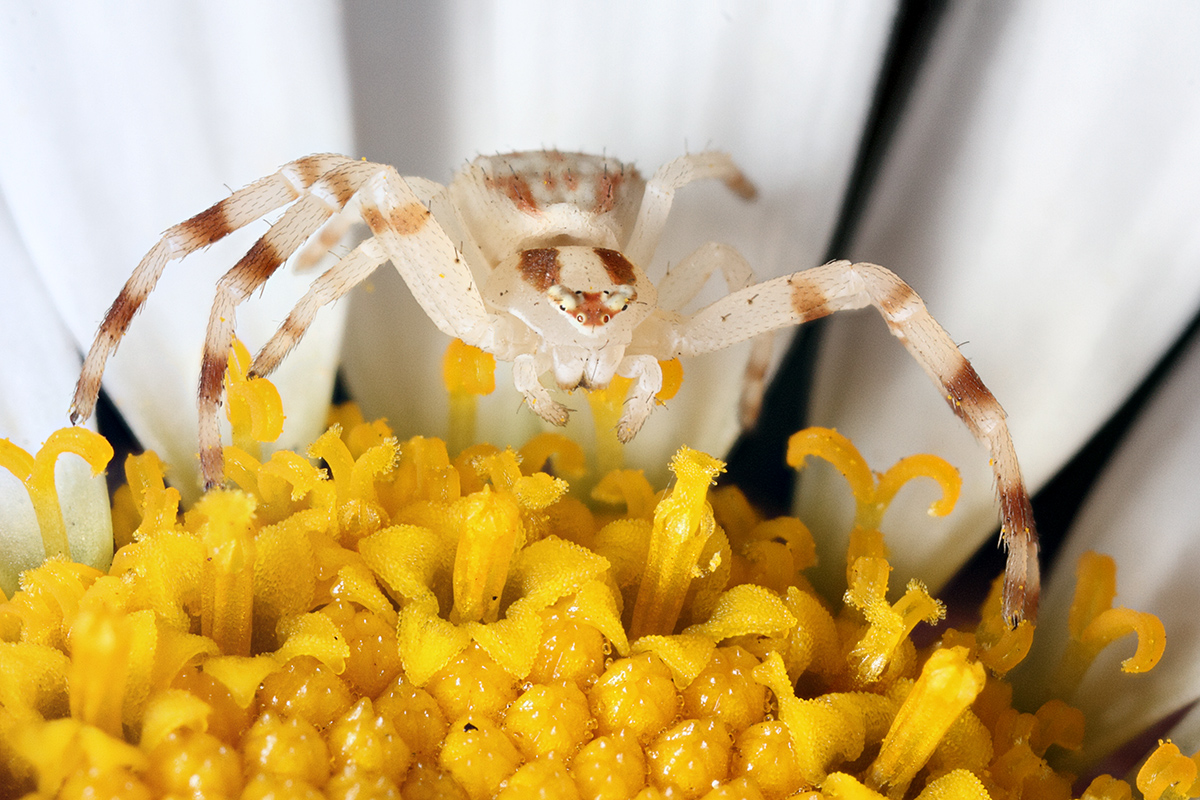
Zygometis xanthogaster
