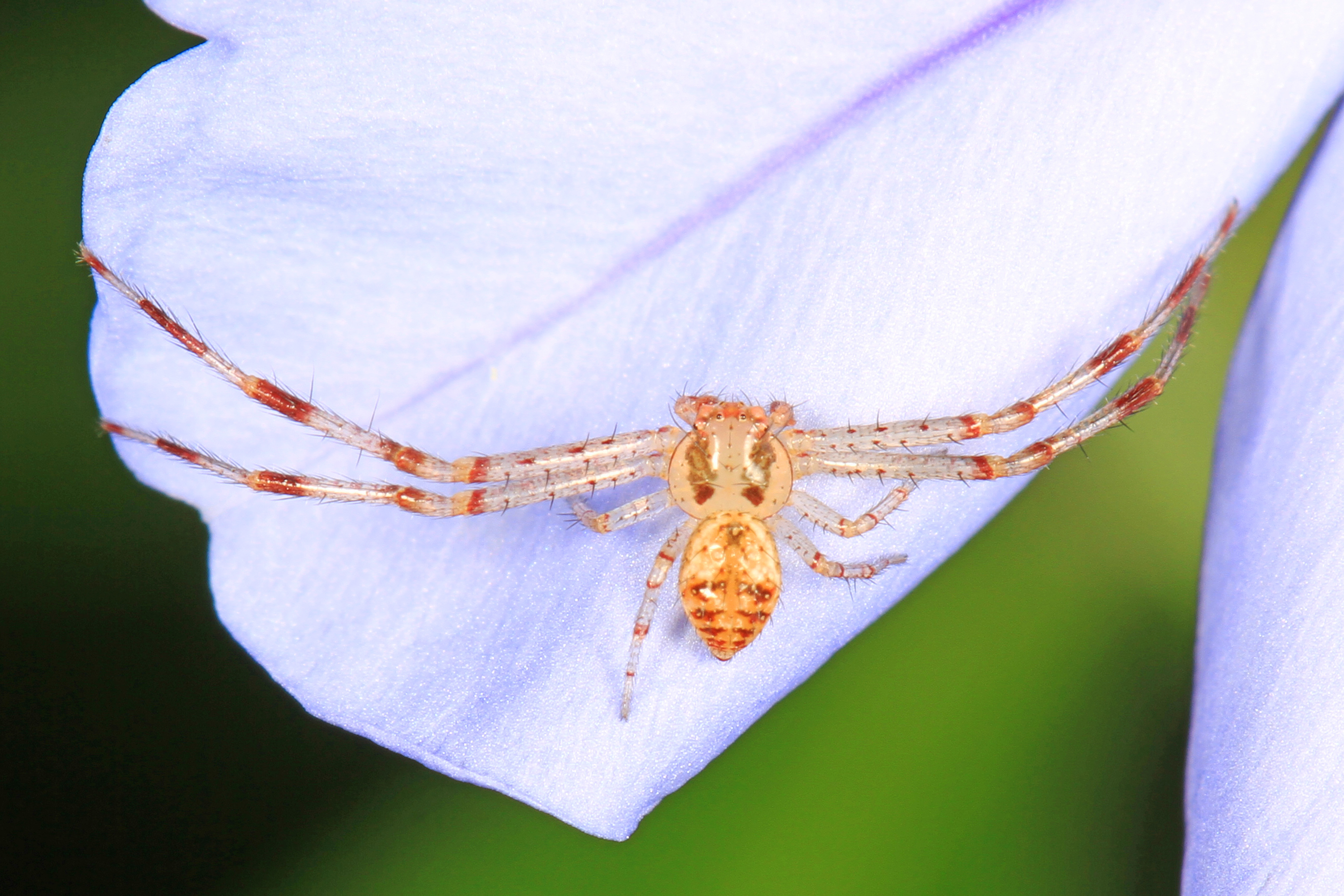
- Misumenops bellulus
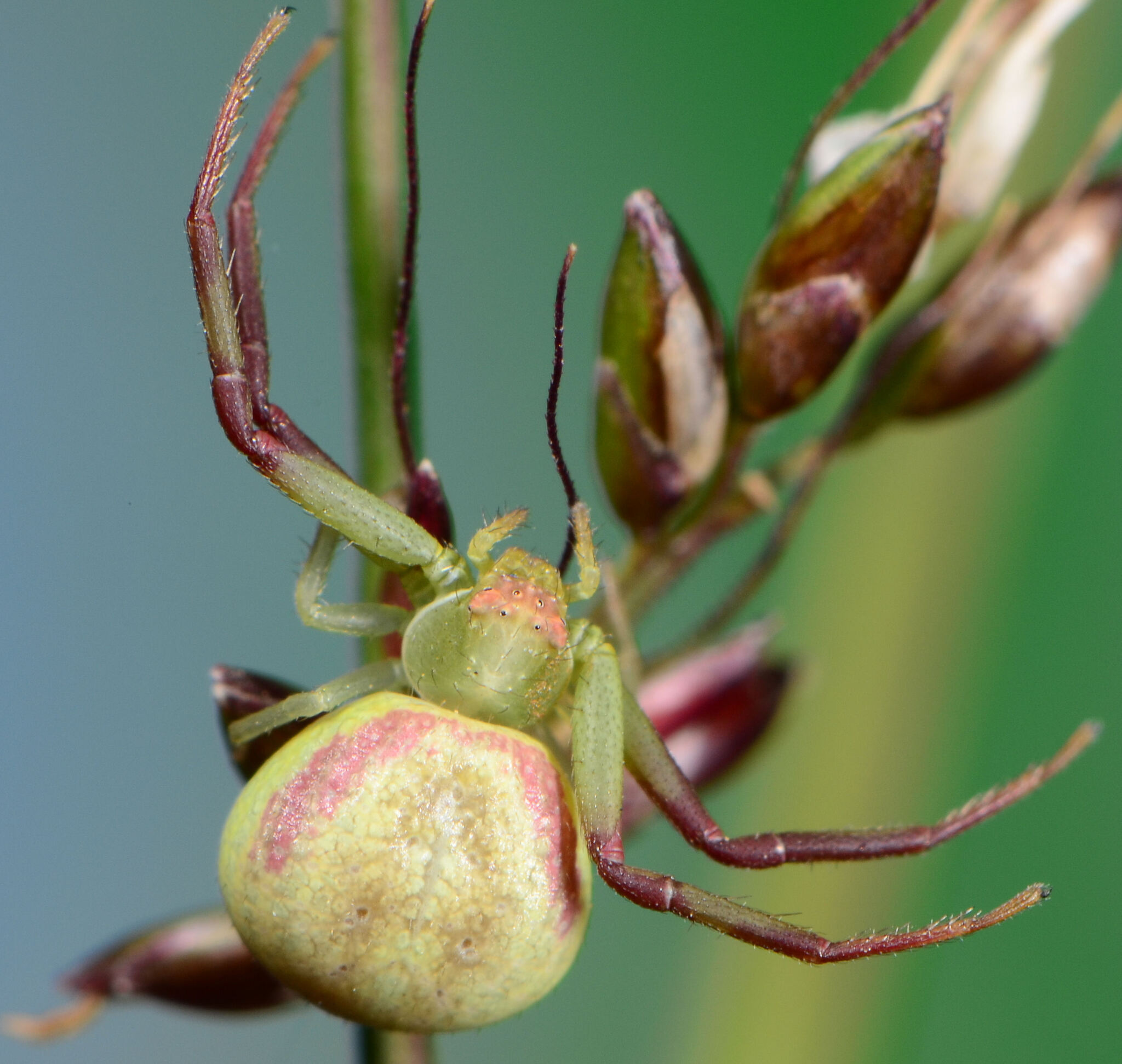
- female M. rubrodecoratus

Scientific classification
- Kingdom: Animalia
- Phylum: Arthropoda
- Subphylum: Chelicerata
- Class: Arachnida
- Order: Araneae
- Infraorder: Araneomorphae
- Family: Thomisidae
- Genus: Misumenops; F. O. P-Cambridge, 1900

Diversity
- more than 50 species

= Misumenops =

Genus of spiders

Misumenops is a common genus of crab spider with more than 50 described species.

The majority of the species of Misumenops, more than 80, have been transferred to 13 genera: Ansiea, Demogenes, Diaea, Ebelingia, Ebrechtella, Henriksenia, Heriaeus, Mecaphesa, Micromisumenops , Misumena, Misumenoides, Misumessus, and Runcinioides.

== Distribution ==
Most species of this genus occur in the Americas from Canada to Argentina, with only a few exceptions:

- Sixteen species are found on Hawaii, one (M. dalmasi) on the Marquesas Islands, one M. melloloitaoi on Tahiti, and one M. rapaensis on Rapa Island.
- Two species (M. forcatus and M. zhangmuensis) occur in China, M. armatus in Central Asia, M. turanicus in Uzbekistan, M. khandalaensis in India, M. morrisi on the Philippines.
- M. rubrodecoratus occurs in Africa, M. decolor only in Ethiopia.

== Description ==
These are small spiders, measuring 2–7 mm in body length. The body colour ranges from yellow to pale green, though the green coloration fades to yellow when preserved in alcohol. Some specimens display red or brown patterns or lines on the carapace and abdomen, and legs I and II are sometimes banded with red or brown.

The carapace is as wide as it is long, low and slightly convex in profile, with the surface clothed with numerous erect spiniform setae. The eyes are arranged in two recurved rows, with the lateral eyes larger than the median eyes and situated on conjoined tubercles. The clypeus is vertical and bears four pairs of long primary setae on its margin. The sternum is heart-shaped.

The abdomen is round in dorsal view and flattened, clothed with numerous erect spiniform setae. The anterior two pairs of legs are approximately equal in length and thickness, but are longer and stronger than the posterior pairs. The prolateral surface of femora I and II bears strong setae, while the ventral surface of the tibiae and metatarsi has a double row of macro-setae. Males exhibit sexual dimorphism in shape, size and colour.

== Name ==
The genus name is derived from the related crab spider genus Misumena and the Greek ending ops "looks like". This ending is often used to denote closely related or similar looking genera.

== Species ==
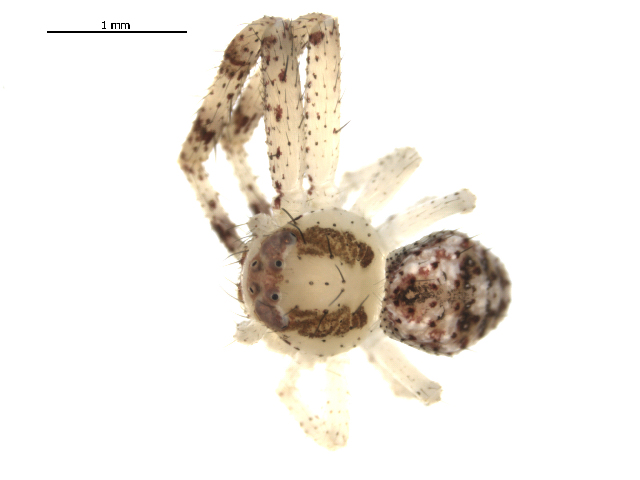
M. bellulus

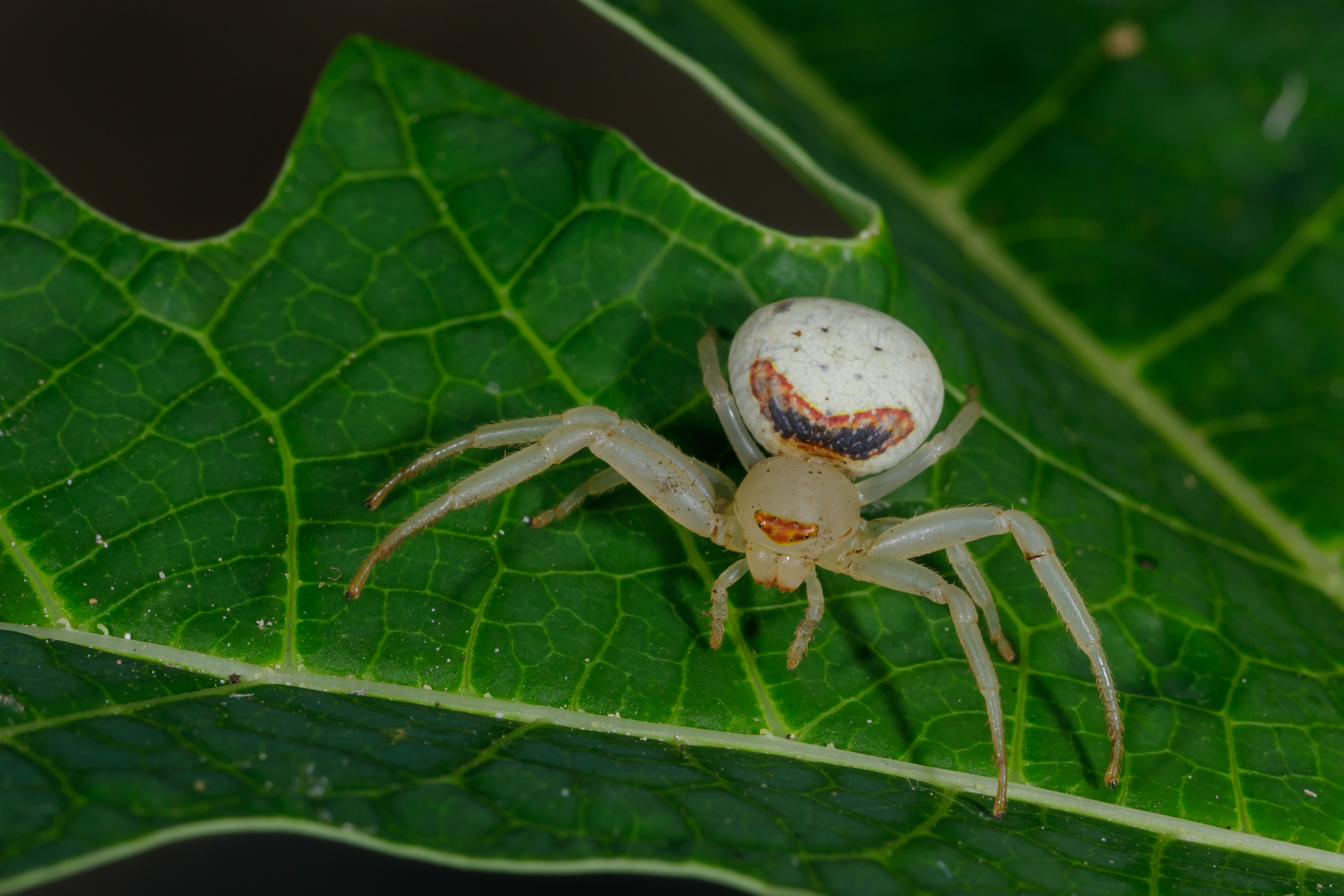
M. callinurus in Brazil

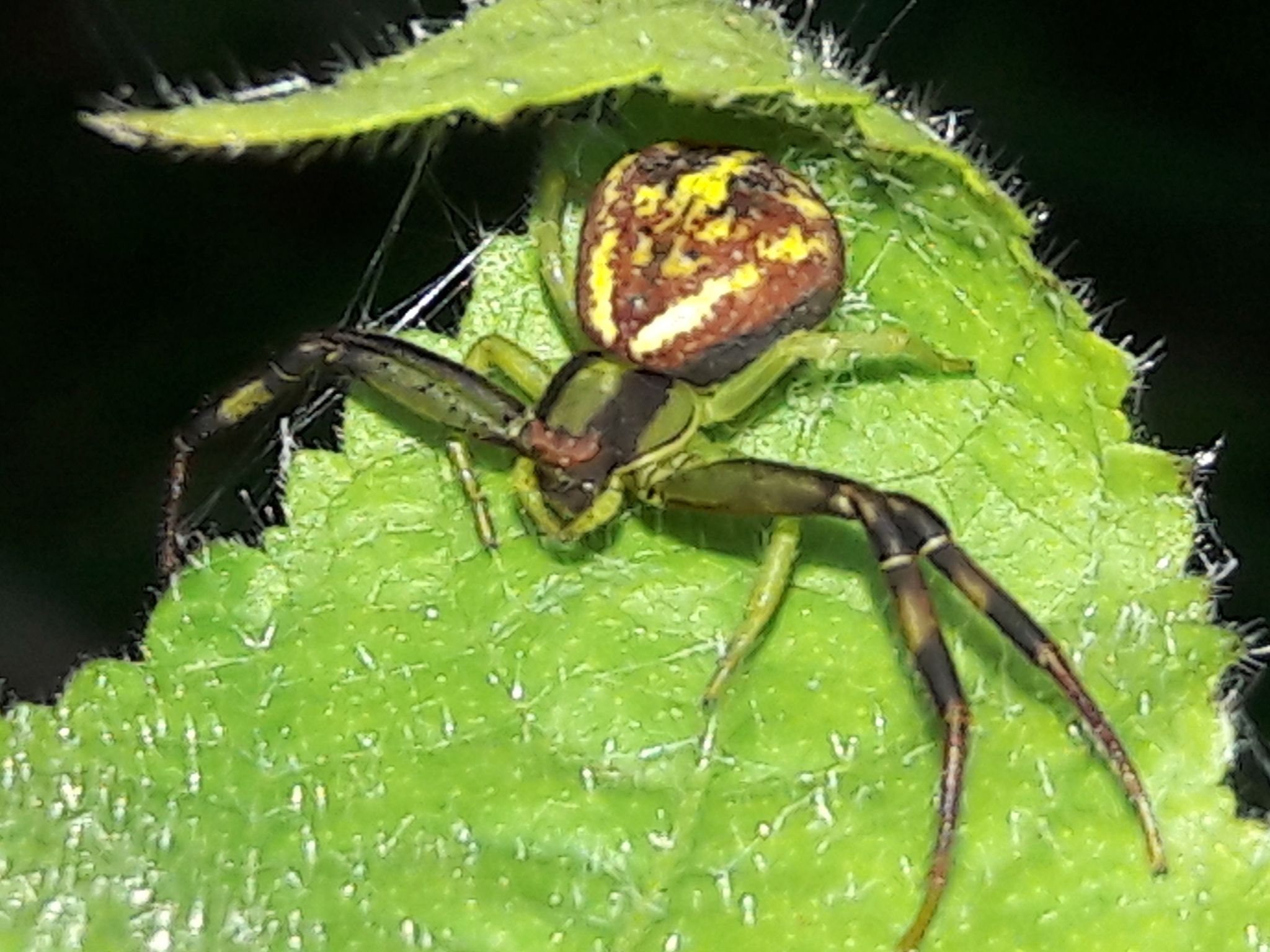
M. maculissparsus

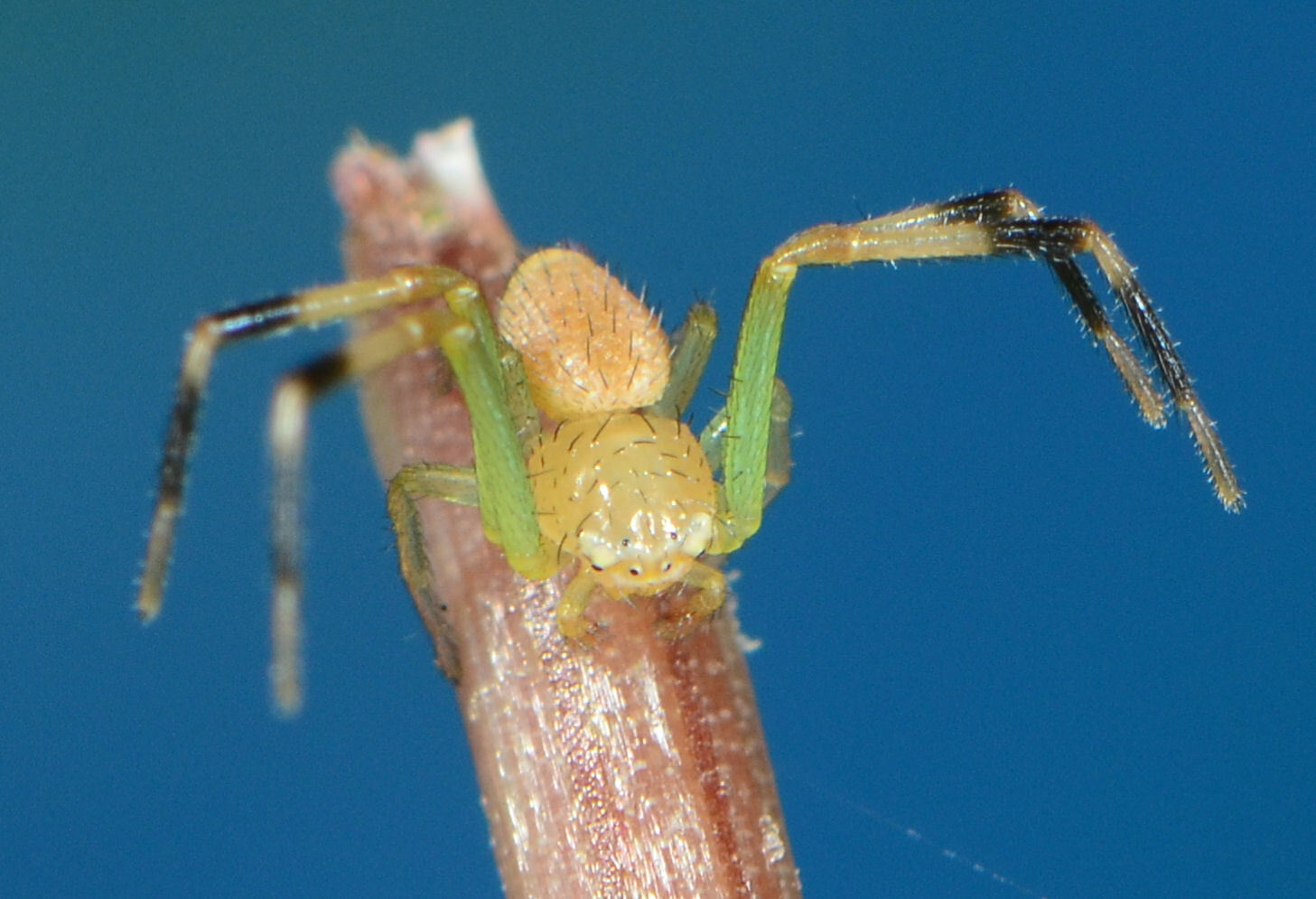
male M. rubrodecoratus

As of October 2025, this genus includes 54 species and one subspecies:

- Misumenops anachoretus (Holmberg, 1876) – Argentina
- Misumenops armatus Spassky, 1952 – Azerbaijan, Kazakhstan, Tajikistan
- Misumenops bellulus (Banks, 1896) – United States, Cuba, Jamaica, Virgin Is. Dominica
- Misumenops biannulipes (Mello-Leitão, 1929) – Brazil
- Misumenops bivittatus (Keyserling, 1880) – Brazil, Uruguay
- Misumenops callinurus Mello-Leitão, 1929 – Brazil
- Misumenops candidoi (Caporiacco, 1948) – Guyana
- Misumenops carneus Mello-Leitão, 1944 – Argentina
- Misumenops conspersus (Keyserling, 1880) – Peru
- Misumenops consuetus (Banks, 1898) – Mexico
- Misumenops croceus (Keyserling, 1880) – Colombia to Paraguay
- Misumenops cruentatus (Walckenaer, 1837) – United States
- Misumenops curadoi Soares, 1943 – Brazil
- Misumenops decolor (Kulczyński, 1901) – Ethiopia
- Misumenops delmasi Berland, 1927 – Marquesas Islands
- Misumenops fluminensis Mello-Leitão, 1929 – Brazil
- Misumenops forcatus Song & Chai, 1990 – China
- Misumenops gibbosus (Blackwall, 1862) – Brazil
- Misumenops gracilis (Keyserling, 1880) – Mexico
- Misumenops guianensis (Taczanowski, 1872) – Venezuela, Brazil, French Guiana, Paraguay
- Misumenops haemorrhous Mello-Leitão, 1949 – Brazil
- Misumenops hunanensis Yin, Peng & Kim, 2000 – China
- Misumenops ignobilis (Badcock, 1932) – Paraguay, Argentina
- Misumenops khandalaensis Tikader, 1965 – India
- Misumenops lacticeps (Mello-Leitão, 1944) – Argentina
- Misumenops lenis (Keyserling, 1880) – Brazil
- Misumenops longispinosus (Mello-Leitão, 1949) – Brazil
- Misumenops maculissparsus (Keyserling, 1891) – Bonaire, Brazil, Argentina (type species)
- Misumenops melloleitaoi Berland, 1942 – French Polynesia (Society Is.: Tahiti, Moorea)
- Misumenops mexicanus (Keyserling, 1880) – Mexico
- Misumenops morrisi Barrion & Litsinger, 1995 – Philippines
- Misumenops ocellatus (Tullgren, 1905) – Bolivia, Argentina
- Misumenops octoguttatus Mello-Leitão, 1941 – Argentina
- Misumenops pallens (Keyserling, 1880) – Guatemala to Argentina
- Misumenops pallidus (Keyserling, 1880) – Colombia to Argentina
  - M. p. reichlini Schenkel, 1949 – Argentina
- Misumenops pascalis (O. Pickard-Cambridge, 1891) – Panama
- Misumenops punctatus (Keyserling, 1880) – Peru
- Misumenops rapaensis Berland, 1934 – Austral Is. (Rapa)
- Misumenops robustus Simon, 1929 – Venezuela, Peru, Brazil
- Misumenops roseofuscus Mello-Leitão, 1944 – Argentina
- Misumenops rubrodecoratus Millot, 1942 – Sub-Saharan Africa
- Misumenops schiapelliae Mello-Leitão, 1944 – Argentina
- Misumenops silvarum Mello-Leitão, 1929 – Brazil
- Misumenops spinifer (Piza, 1937) – Brazil
- Misumenops spinitarsis Mello-Leitão, 1932 – Brazil
- Misumenops spinulosissimus (Berland, 1936) – Cape Verde
- Misumenops splendens (Keyserling, 1880) – Mexico
- Misumenops temibilis (Holmberg, 1876) – Chile, Argentina
- Misumenops temihana Garb, 2007 – French Polynesia (Society Is.)
- Misumenops turanicus Charitonov, 1946 – Uzbekistan
- Misumenops variegatus (Keyserling, 1880) – Peru
- Misumenops varius (Keyserling, 1880) – Colombia
- Misumenops zeugma Mello-Leitão, 1929 – Brazil
- Misumenops zhangmuensis (Hu & Li, 1987) – China
