= Misumenops nepenthicola =

Misumenops nepenthicola can refer to two species of spider:

- Misumenops nepenthicola Fage, 1928 is a synonym of Henriksenia nepenthicola
- Misumenops nepenthicola Bristowe, 1930 – incorrectly Misumenops nepenthicola (Pocock, 1898) – is a replaced synonym of Henriksenia labuanica
- It may also be used incorrectly for other species of the genus Henriksenia
