= Microhyla borneensis =

Conservation status
- Least Concern (IUCN 3.1)

Scientific classification
- Kingdom: Animalia
- Phylum: Chordata
- Class: Amphibia
- Order: Anura
- Family: Microhylidae
- Genus: Microhyla
- Species: M. borneensis

Binomial name
- Microhyla borneensis Parker, 1928

Synonyms
- Microhyla nepenthicola Das and Haas, 2010

Species of amphibian

Microhyla borneensis (junior synonym Microhyla nepenthicola), also known as the Matang narrow-mouthed frog, is a species of microhylid frog found in the Matang Range in Sarawak, Borneo. It was once the smallest known frog from the Old World (since 2012, the record holder has been Paedophryne amauensis from New Guinea). Adult males of this species generally have a snout–vent length (SVL) in the range of 10.6–12.8 mm (0.42–0.50 in), but may reach a maximum of 13 mm (0.51 in). Adult females have an SVL of 16–19 mm (0.63–0.75 in). The tadpoles measure just 3 mm.

== Discovery ==
Microhyla borneensis was first described by Hampton Wildman Parker in 1928. Frogs of the species that was eventually described as Microhyla nepenthicola had been known for at least 100 years prior to its description in 2010. However, scientists had always assumed that the frogs were juveniles of another species. Researchers Indraneil Das and Alexander Haas recognized that they were actually adults when they heard the frogs calling in Kubah National Park, since only adult frogs make calls. Adult males call from the pitcher plants at dusk. However, in 2011 it was shown that M. borneensis and M. nepenthicola are the same species. What was until that point commonly known as Microhyla borneensis was another species, newly described as Microhyla malang.

The smallest known Old World frog species prior to the description of Microhyla nepenthicola were Stumpffia pygmaea and Stumpffia tridactyla: S. pygmaea with an SVL of 10–12.5 mm; S. tridactyla with an SVL of 8.6–12 mm.

== Description ==
Microhyla borneensis is a very small species with a snout–vent length of about 18 mm (0.71 in) for females and around two thirds of this for males. It has a broadly triangular body that is flattened dorso-ventrally. The snout is obtusely pointed, the eyes are small and have round pupils and there are no visible tympani. The skin on the dorsal surface may be smooth or bear tubercles and that of the ventral surface is always smooth. The limbs are short. The hands are unwebbed and the outer digits are spatulate. The digits of the feet are partially webbed. M. borneensis has less webbing on its feet than most frogs, which may be beneficial when trying to climb the sides of the pitcher plants, which can be slippery. The dorsal surface of this frog is reddish-brown, the throat is mottled brown and the ventral surface is pale.

== Distribution and habitat ==
Microhyla borneensis is known from the Matang Range in Sarawak, Borneo, but it is presumably widespread in suitable habitats in the lowlands of northern Borneo.

M. borneensis is found near Mount Serapi in Kubah National Park, Sarawak, Borneo. It spends much of its life cycle in the traps of the pitcher plant Nepenthes ampullaria, after which it is named. It is therefore considered a nepenthebiont. This is not particularly unusual; in fact, it shares this environment with a species of crab spider, Henriksenia labuanica, which is also commonly found in Nepenthes pitchers. This spider's former binomen, Misumenops nepenthicola, and that of the related species of Singapore, Henriksenia nepenthicola, had the specific epithet nepenthicola applied for this reason.

== Reproduction ==
Microhyla borneensis breeds in the water-filled pitchers of Nepenthes ampullaria, a pitcher plant that is a feature of the floor of the Borneo rainforest. Multiple clutches may be laid in the same pitcher which may contain tadpoles of different ages. Metamorphosis takes place about a fortnight after the eggs are laid.

== Status ==
This frog is seldom seen, perhaps because of its small size and inconspicuous appearance. Its numbers are thought to be in slow decline but the International Union for Conservation of Nature (IUCN) rates it as being of "Least Concern" as it considers that the rate of decline is insufficient to justify listing it in a more threatened category. No particular threats to this species have been identified.

== See also ==
- Smallest amphibian
