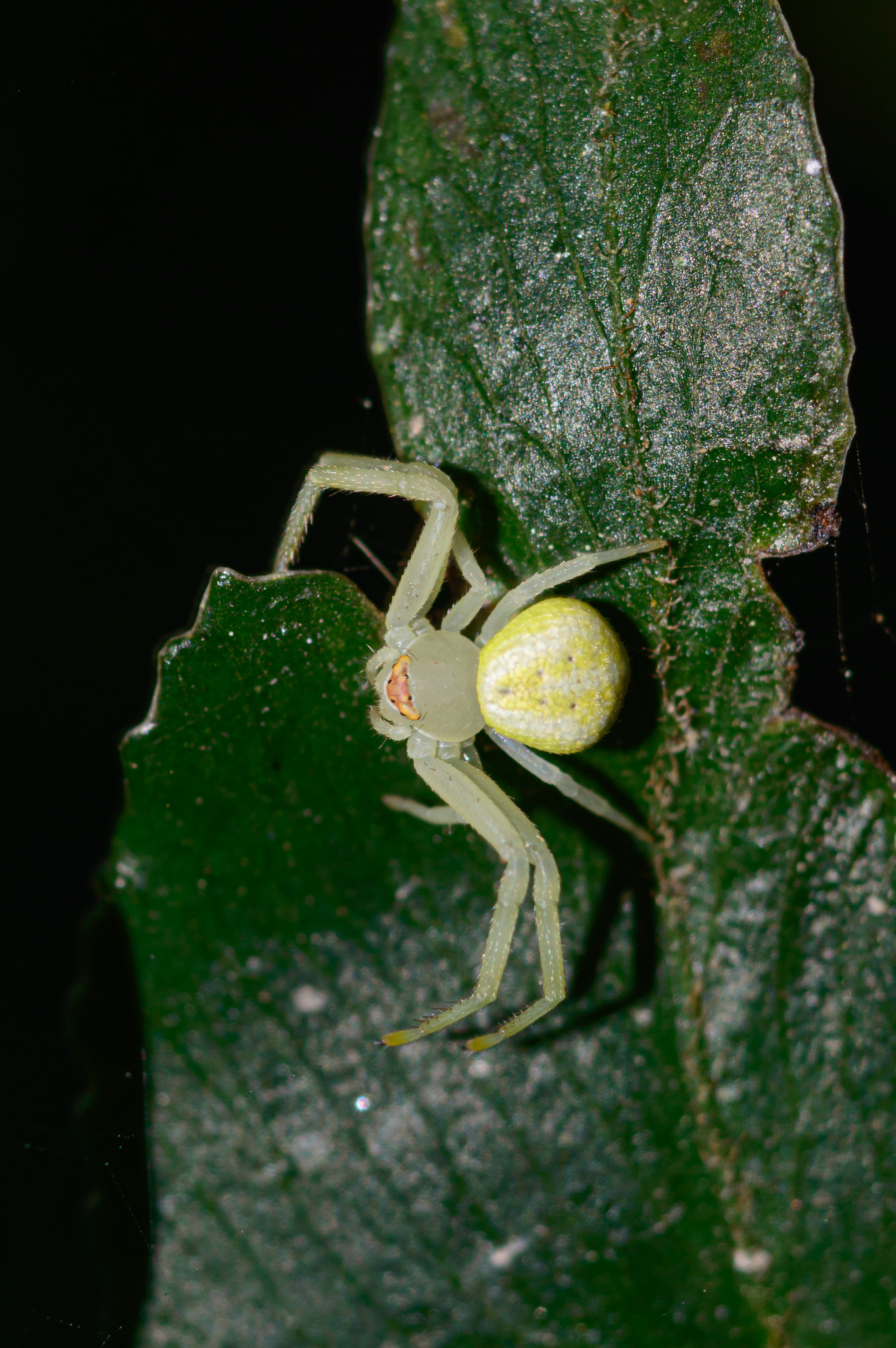
- female from Brazil

Scientific classification
- Kingdom: Animalia
- Phylum: Arthropoda
- Subphylum: Chelicerata
- Class: Arachnida
- Order: Araneae
- Infraorder: Araneomorphae
- Family: Thomisidae
- Genus: Misumenops
- Species: M. pallens

Binomial name
- Misumenops pallens (Keyserling, 1880)

Synonyms
- Misumena pallens Keyserling, 1880; Misumena bianulata Mello-Leitão, 1929; Misumena viridis Badcock, 1932; Metadiaea melloleitaoi Piza, 1933; Metadiaea dubitata Piza, 1933; Misumena rubromaculata Piza, 1934; Misumena parva Piza, 1934; Metadiaea dimidiata Piza, 1936; Metadiaea ypirangae Piza, 1936; Misumenoides eroticus Mello-Leitão, 1947; Misumenoides mourei Mello-Leitão, 1947

= Misumenops pallens =

Species of crab spider

Misumenops pallens is a species of crab spider in the family Thomisidae. Originally described as Misumena pallens by Keyserling in 1880, it was transferred to the genus Misumenops by Petrunkevitch in 1911. The species has a wide distribution range from Guatemala to Argentina.

== Taxonomy ==
Misumenops pallens has a complex taxonomic history with numerous synonyms. Rinaldi (1983) conducted a comprehensive revision that established eleven species as synonyms of M. pallens, including Metadiaea melloleitaoi, M. dubitata, Misumena bianulata, M. viridis, M. rubromaculata, M. parva, Metadiaea dimidiata, M. ypirangae, Misumenoides eroticus, and M. mourei. This synonymization was based on detailed morphological studies including examination of the internal structure of female epigynes, which revealed consistent characteristics across all examined specimens despite external variations in coloration and markings.

== Distribution ==
M. pallens is distributed throughout much of South America and parts of Central America, with records from Guatemala to Argentina. In Brazil, the species has been documented in the states of Minas Gerais, Paraná, Rio de Janeiro, Santa Catarina, and São Paulo.

== Description ==
Misumenops pallens exhibits pronounced sexual dimorphism, with females being considerably larger than males. Females range from 6.25 to 10.62 mm in total length, while males are much smaller at 2.03 to 3.69 mm.

The species displays considerable variation in coloration. The cephalothorax and legs are typically pale yellow-brown, with legs III and IV being lighter in color. The eye region may be white, pinkish, or the same color as the cephalothorax. The legs feature distinctive brown bands on the distal third of the tibiae and metatarsi, with dark brown tarsi and claws. The abdomen is characterized by small, irregular, milk-white scale-like patches against a background that may range from the same color as the cephalothorax to having reddish-brown borders.

Males are notably smaller and more heavily setose than females. They have a distinctive green coloration on the abdomen and posterior legs that fades in preserved specimens. The male palpal structure includes tibiae with prominent internal apical angles bearing long setae and a distinctive external apical process with a finger-like projection.
