= Mount Serapi =

Highest point
- Elevation: 911 m (2,989 ft)
- Prominence: 864 m (2,835 ft)
- Coordinates: 1.5882400793780602°N 110.19102161897361°E

Geography
- Country: Malaysia
- State: Sarawak
- Division: Kuching
- District: Lundu

Mount Serapi (Malay: Gunung Serapi) is a mountain located in Lundu District, Kuching Division, Sarawak. The mount is located inside of Kubah National Park.

== History ==
The initial South Indian settlers arrived as tea cultivators brought in by Charles Brooke during the 1920s and settled in the Matang region, where they cultivated tea on the slopes of Mount Serapi. These Indian settlers are from the Tamil and Malayali labourers.

== Biodiversity ==
Several nonvolant small mammals found in the area of the mount are Rajah spiny rat (Maxomys rajah), long-tailed giant rat (Leopoldamys sabanus), whitehead's spiny rat (Maxomys whiteheadi) and Polynesian rat (Rattus exulans). From the altitude of 100m, the endemic pitcher plant of Borneo, Nepenthes hirsuta could be found while the pitcher plant from the species Nepenthes tentaculata are distributed from the altitude of 800m.
