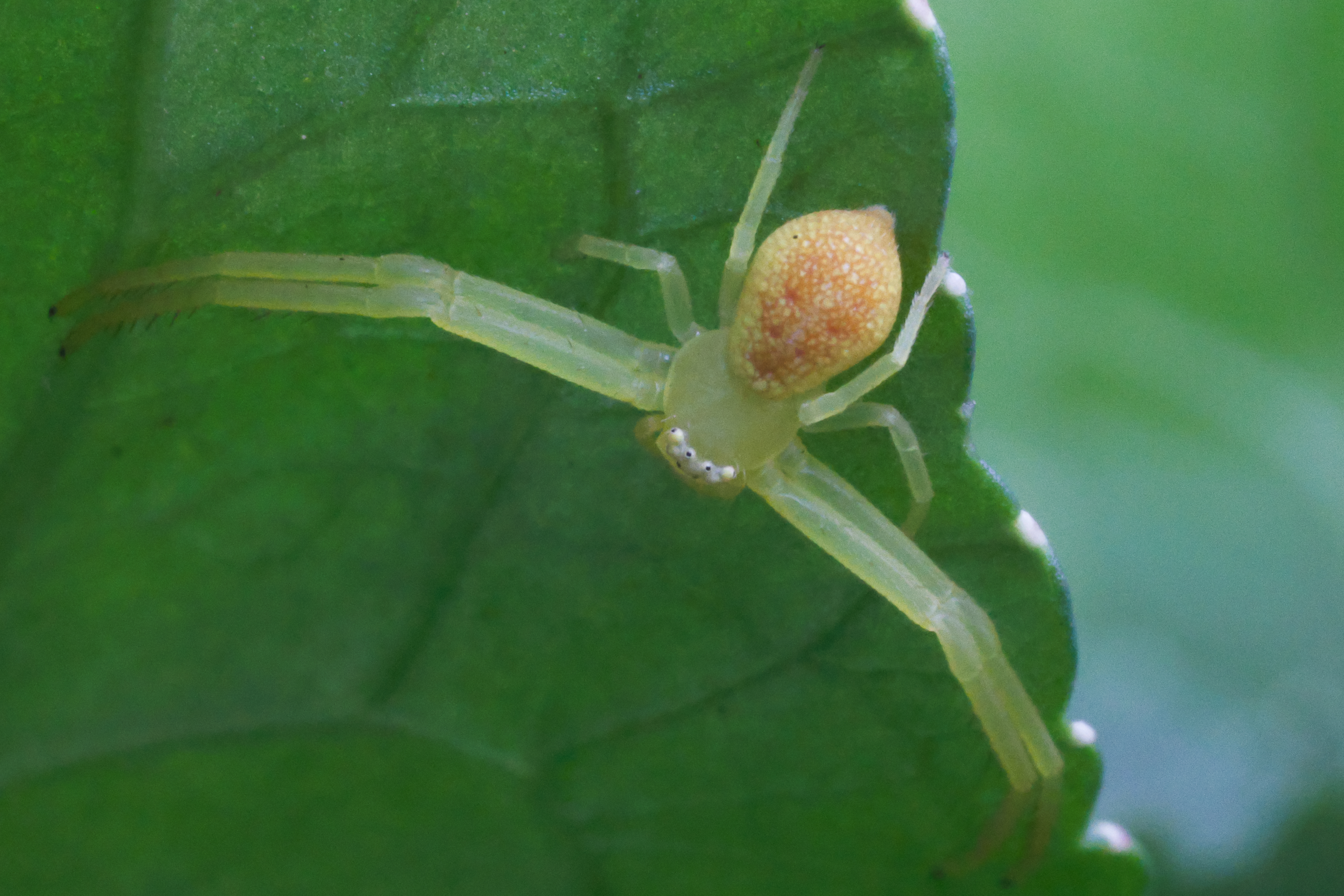
- Misumessus oblongus

Scientific classification
- Kingdom: Animalia
- Phylum: Arthropoda
- Subphylum: Chelicerata
- Class: Arachnida
- Order: Araneae
- Infraorder: Araneomorphae
- Family: Thomisidae
- Genus: Misumessus
- Species: M. oblongus

Binomial name
- Misumessus oblongus (Keyserling, 1880)

= Misumessus oblongus =

Species of spider

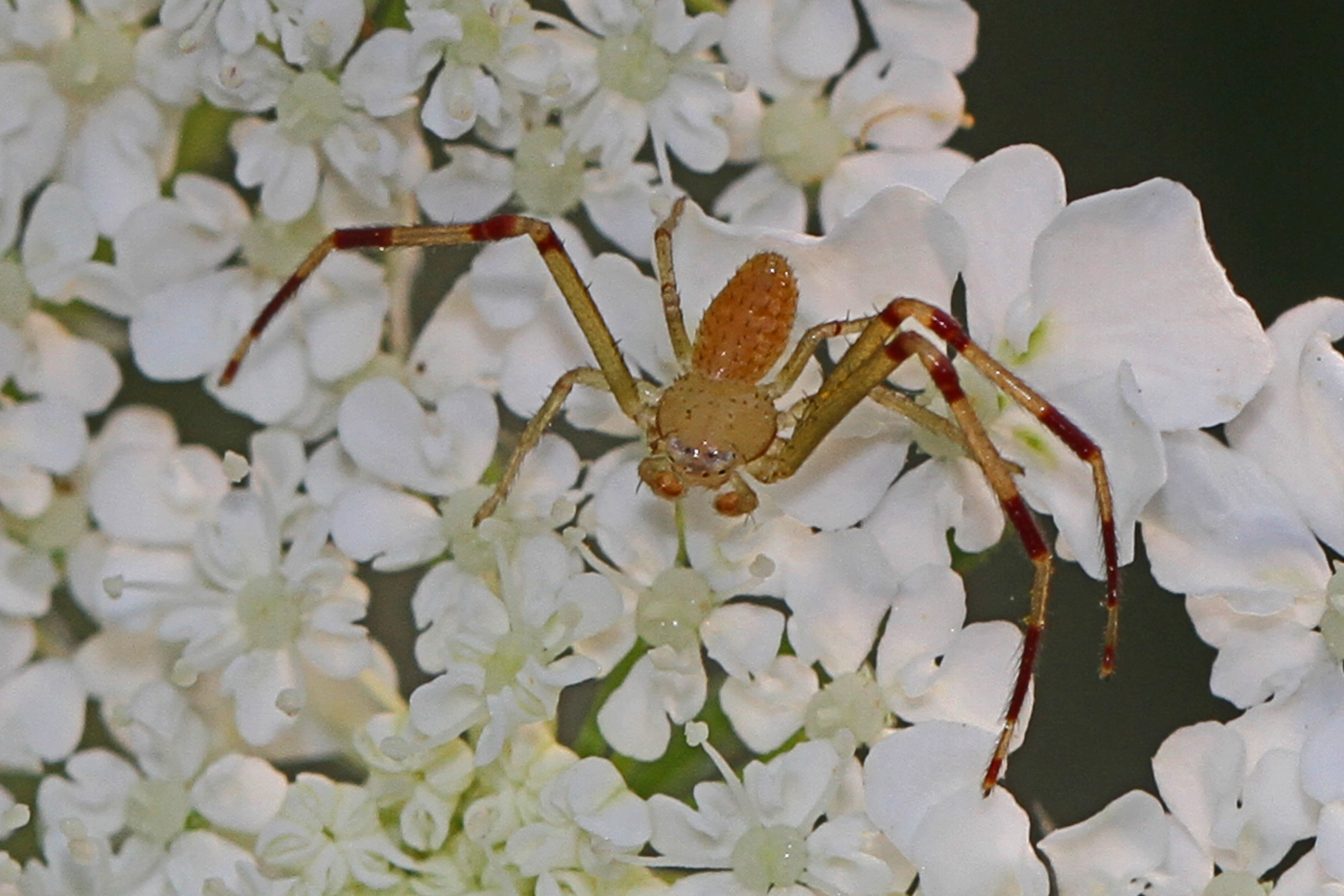
Crab Spider - Misumessus oblongus (immature male)

American Green Crab Spider (Misumessus oblongus)

Misumessus oblongus, also known as the American green crab spider, is a species of crab spider in the family Thomisidae. It is found in Canada, the United States, and Mexico.
