= Henriksenia nepenthicola =

Scientific classification
- Domain: Eukaryota
- Kingdom: Animalia
- Phylum: Arthropoda
- Subphylum: Chelicerata
- Class: Arachnida
- Order: Araneae
- Infraorder: Araneomorphae
- Family: Thomisidae
- Genus: Henriksenia
- Species: H. nepenthicola

Binomial name
- Henriksenia nepenthicola (Fage, 1928)

Synonyms
- Misumenops nepenthicola Fage, 1928; not Bristowe, 1930

Species of spider

Henriksenia nepenthicola, synonym Misumenops nepenthicola, is a species of crab spider. It is native to Singapore. It lives inside the pitchers of a number of lowland Nepenthes pitcher plants. As such, it is classified as a nepenthephile. They are slow-moving spiders which do not actively hunt. Males and females both reach a length of 6 mm.

== Taxonomy ==
The species was first described by Louis Fage in 1928 as Misumenops nepenthicola. It was transferred to the genus Henriksenia in 2009. A complication is that in 1930, W. S. Bristowe used the name Misumenops nepenthicola for a different species. An application to preserve Bristowe's name over Fage's was rejected in 2007, and in 2009, Henriksenia labuanica was published as a replacement name for Bristowe's name.

In 2006, Pekka T. Lehtinen wrote that the name "Misumenops nepenthicola" had been used for at least five different species, possibly because of a mistaken belief that there was only one species of spider belonging to the tribe Misumenini living in Nepenthes pitchers.
