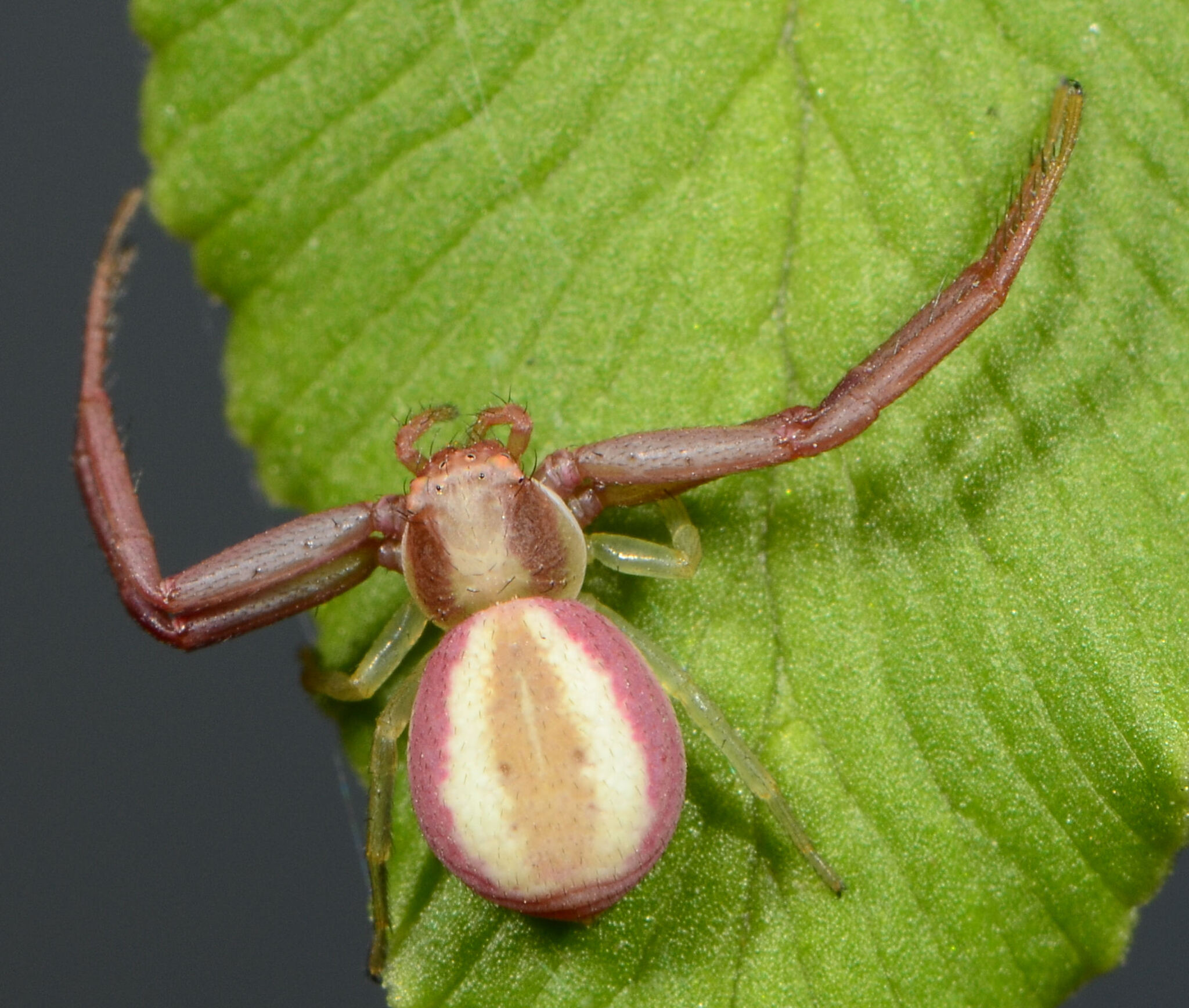
- female
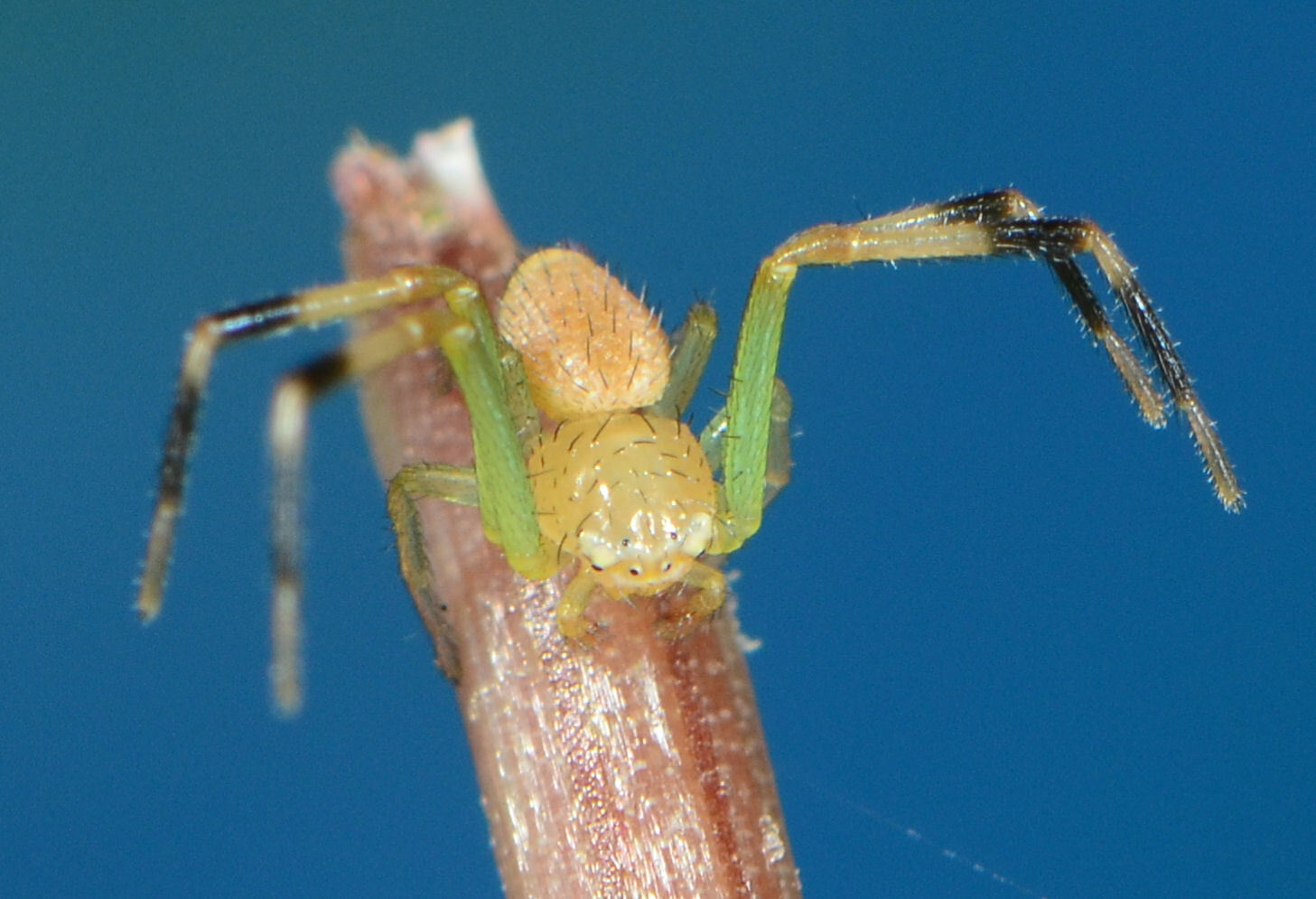
- male

Scientific classification
- Kingdom: Animalia
- Phylum: Arthropoda
- Subphylum: Chelicerata
- Class: Arachnida
- Order: Araneae
- Infraorder: Araneomorphae
- Family: Thomisidae
- Genus: Misumenops
- Species: M. rubrodecoratus

Binomial name
- Misumenops rubrodecoratus Millot, 1942

= Misumenops rubrodecoratus =

Red-back Crab Spider

Species of spider

Misumenops rubrodecoratus is a species of spider in the family Thomisidae. It is endemic to Sub-Saharan Africa and is commonly known as the red-back crab spider.

== Distribution ==
Misumenops rubrodecoratus is found throughout Sub-Saharan Africa.

In South Africa, the species occurs in all nine provinces. Notable locations include Baviaanskloof Wilderness Area, Kruger National Park, Golden Gate Highlands National Park, Addo Elephant National Park, and numerous other protected areas across the country.

== Habitat and ecology ==
Misumenops rubrodecoratus inhabits grass, shrubs, flowers and trees across multiple biomes including Forest, Indian Ocean Coastal Belt, Nama Karoo, Grassland, Thicket and Savanna. The species occurs at altitudes ranging from 6 to 2,020 m.

This is by far the most common thomisid species recorded from South Africa. Adults have been collected throughout the year except during the winter months. The species is frequently encountered on crops including avocado, citrus, cotton, kenaf, lucerne, macadamia, maize, pecans, pine plantations, pistachio, pumpkin, sugar cane, sunflower, strawberries and tomatoes.

== Description ==
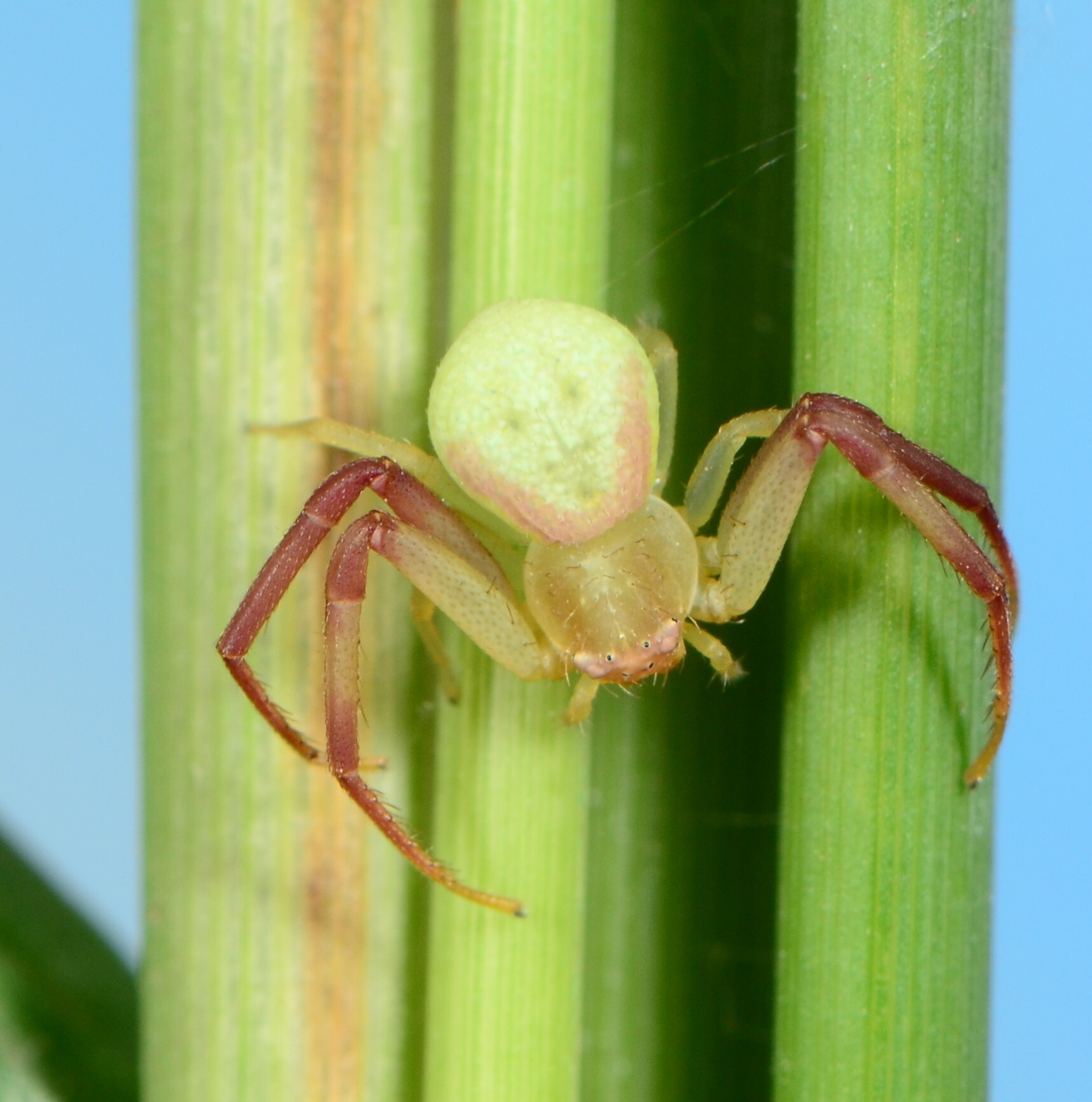
female

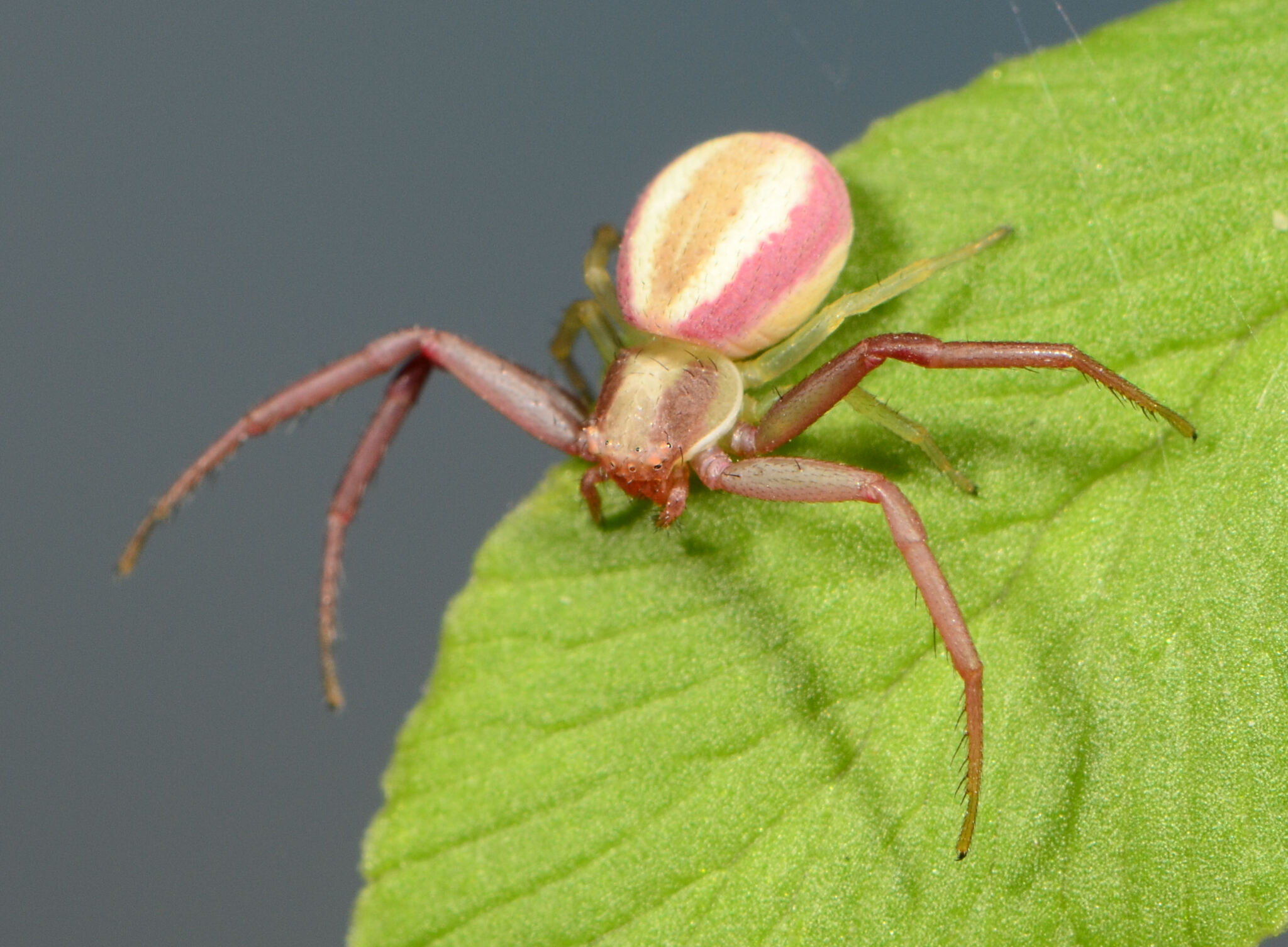
female

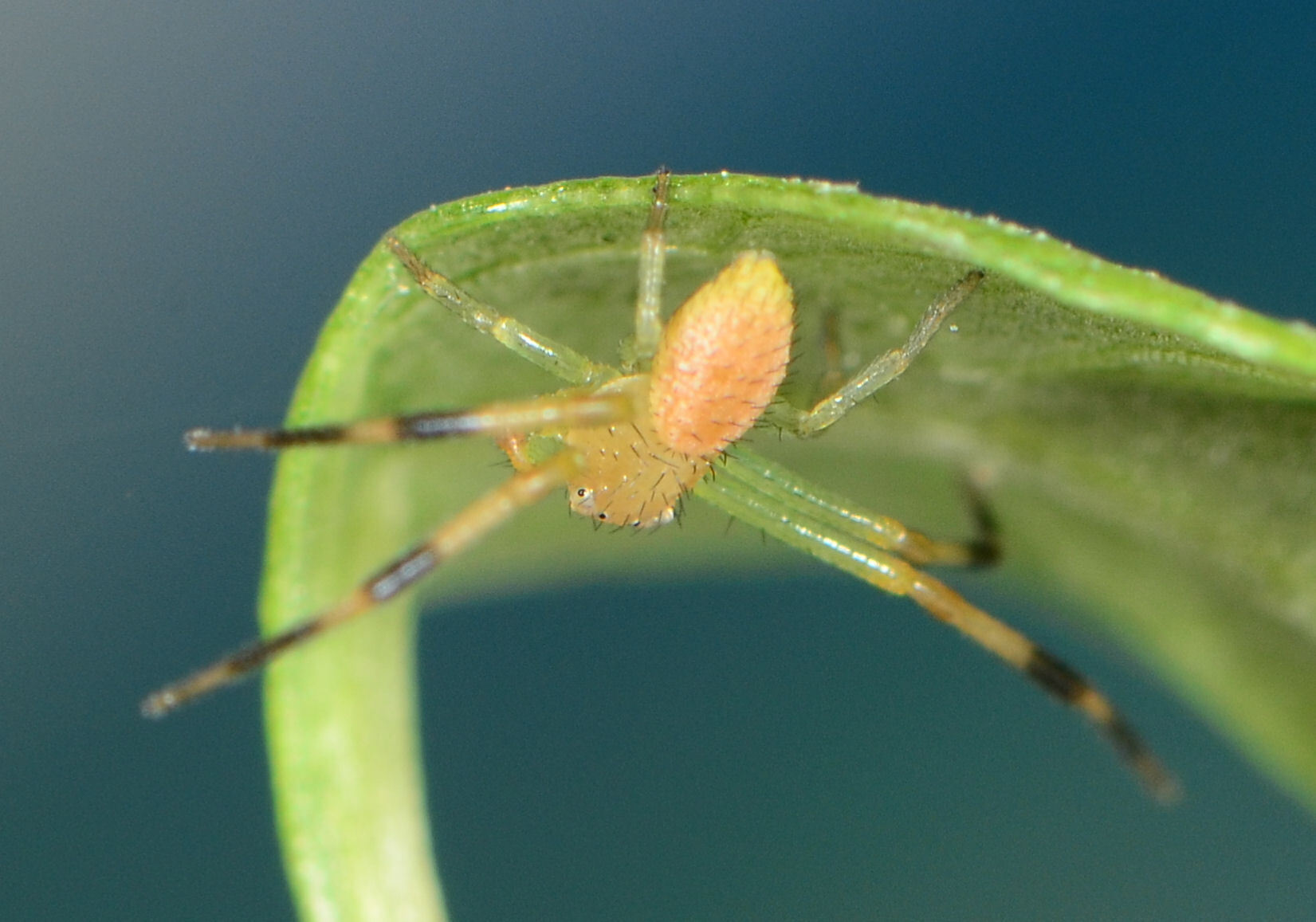
male

== Conservation ==
Misumenops rubrodecoratus is listed as Least Concern by the South African National Biodiversity Institute due to its wide geographical range. The species is protected in more than 35 protected areas.

== Taxonomy ==
Misumenops rubrodecoratus was originally described by Jacques Millot in 1942 from Guinea. It was revised by Dippenaar-Schoeman in 1983.
