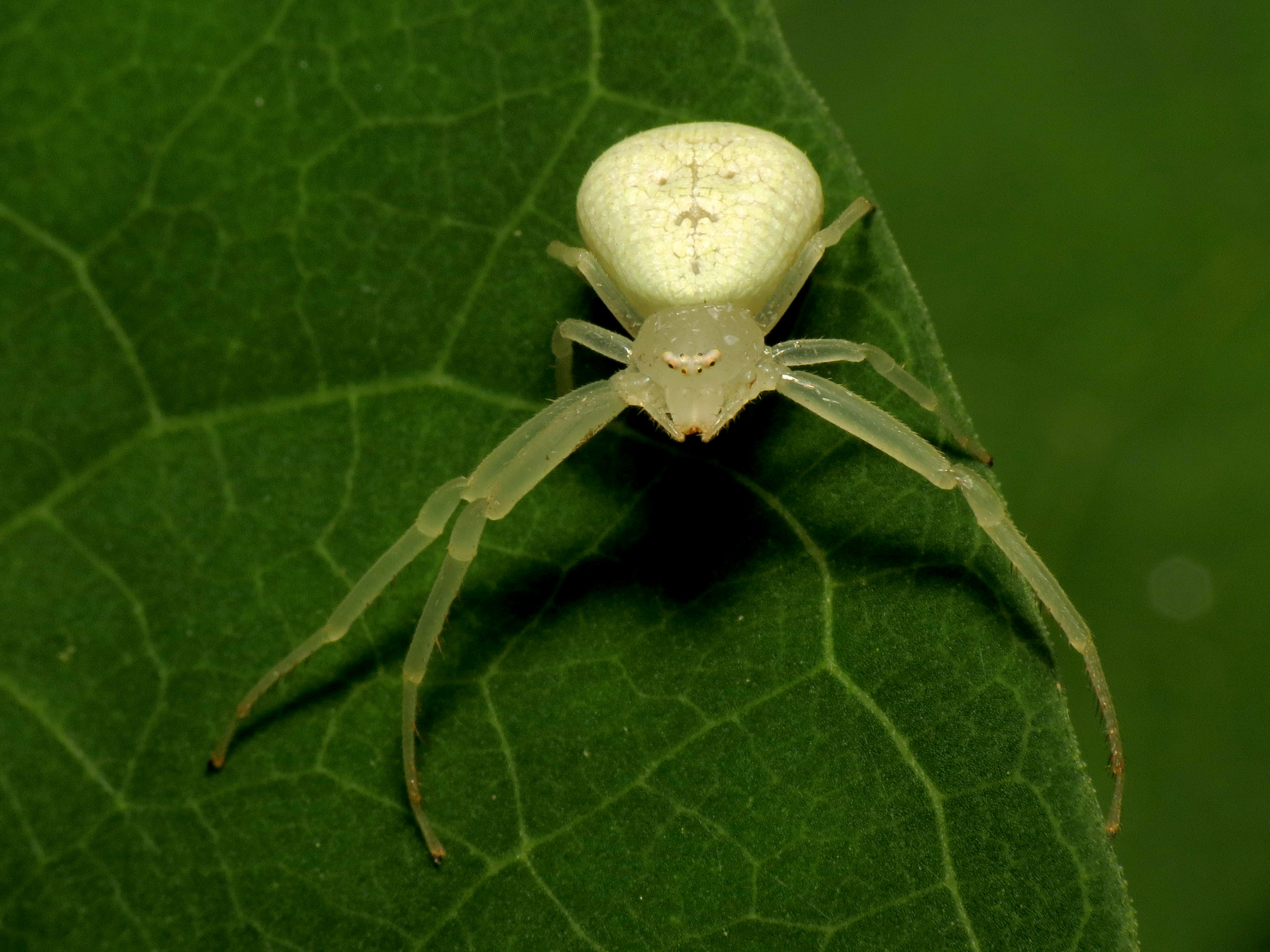
- M. oblongus in Washington D.C.

Scientific classification
- Domain: Eukaryota
- Kingdom: Animalia
- Phylum: Arthropoda
- Subphylum: Chelicerata
- Class: Arachnida
- Order: Araneae
- Infraorder: Araneomorphae
- Family: Thomisidae
- Genus: Misumessus; Banks, 1904

Type species
- Misumessus oblongus (Keyserling, 1880)

Species
- 7, see text.

= Misumessus =

Genus of spiders

Misumessus is a genus of North American and Caribbean crab spiders first described by Nathan Banks in 1904. They look similar to members of Misumena, but are much spinier. It was considered a monotypic genus until 2017, but its taxonomic standing has been debated throughout the 20th century, first as a synonym of Misumenops, then later as its subgenus. It was raised to genus status in 2008, but has still been confused with similar genera, some of which were only known by character descriptions made by Eugène Simon nearly fifty years earlier.

== Species ==
As of February 2019 it contains seven species:

- Misumessus bishopae Edwards, 2017 – Puerto Rico, Dominica, Grenadines
- Misumessus blackwalli Edwards, 2017 – Bermuda
- Misumessus dicaprioi Edwards, 2017 – USA
- Misumessus lappi Edwards, 2017 – USA
- Misumessus oblongus (Keyserling, 1880) – Canada, USA
- Misumessus quinteroi Edwards, 2017 – Central America, Caribbean
- Misumessus tamiami Edwards, 2017 – USA
