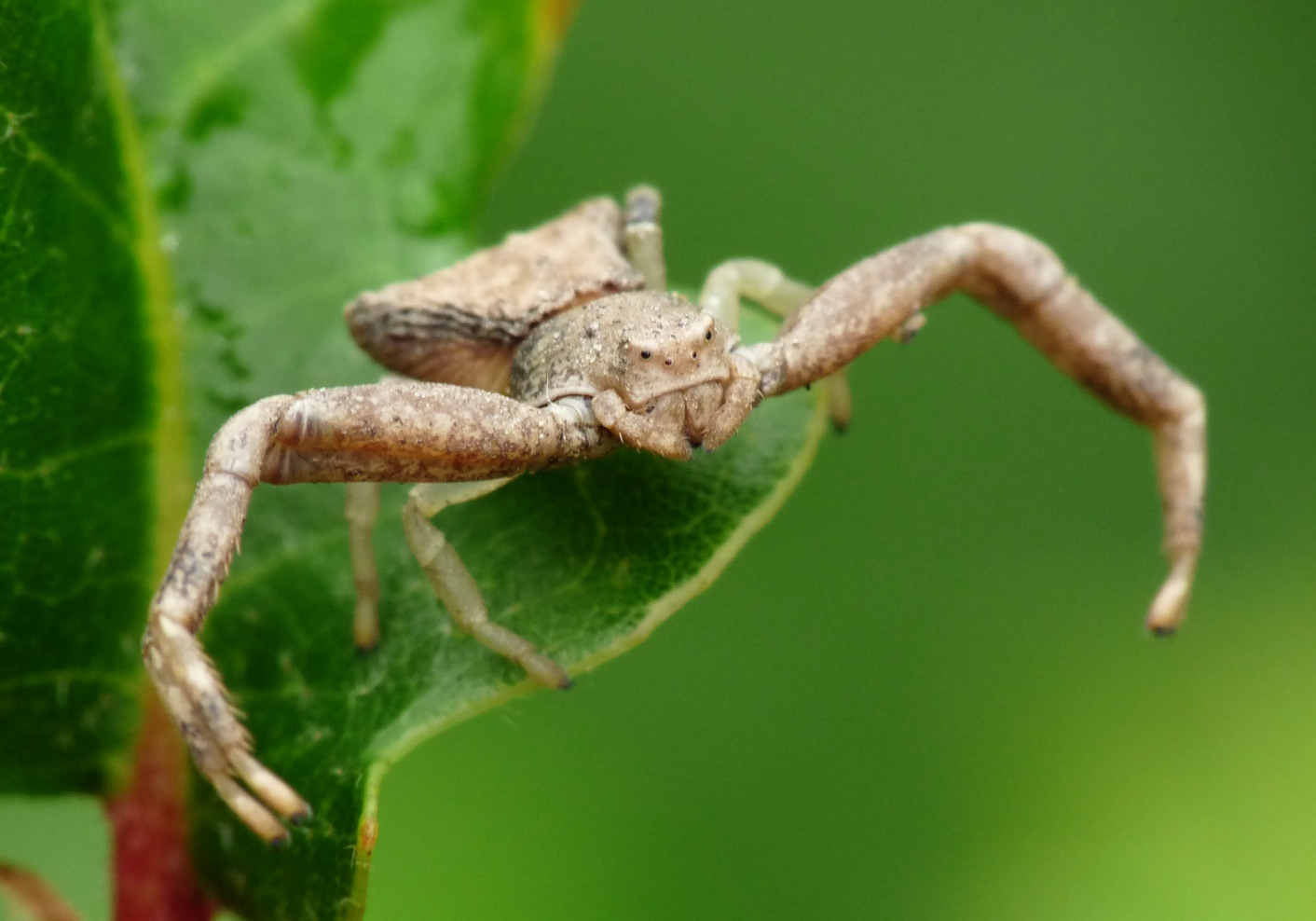
- Pistius truncatus

Scientific classification
- Kingdom: Animalia
- Phylum: Arthropoda
- Subphylum: Chelicerata
- Class: Arachnida
- Order: Araneae
- Infraorder: Araneomorphae
- Family: Thomisidae
- Genus: Pistius; Simon, 1875

Type species
- Aranea truncata Pallas, 1772

Species
- See text

Diversity
- 11 species

= Pistius =

Genus of spiders

Pistius is a genus of crab spiders with nine described species. Most occur in Asia, only P. truncatus has a palaearctic distribution.

== Species ==
- Pistius barchensis Basu, 1965 (India)
- Pistius bhadurii Basu, 1965 (India)
- Pistius gangulyi Basu, 1965 (India, China)
- Pistius kalimpus Tikader, 1970 (India)
- Pistius kanikae Basu, 1964 (India)
- Pistius robustus Basu, 1965 (India)
- Pistius rotundus Tang & Li, 2010 (China)
- Pistius tikaderi Kumari & Mittal, 1999 (India)
- Pistius truncatus (Pallas, 1772) (Palearctic)
- Pistius undulatus Karsch, 1879 (Russia, Kazakhstan, China, Korea, Japan)
- Pistius wulingensis Tian, Zhou & Peng, 2018 (China)

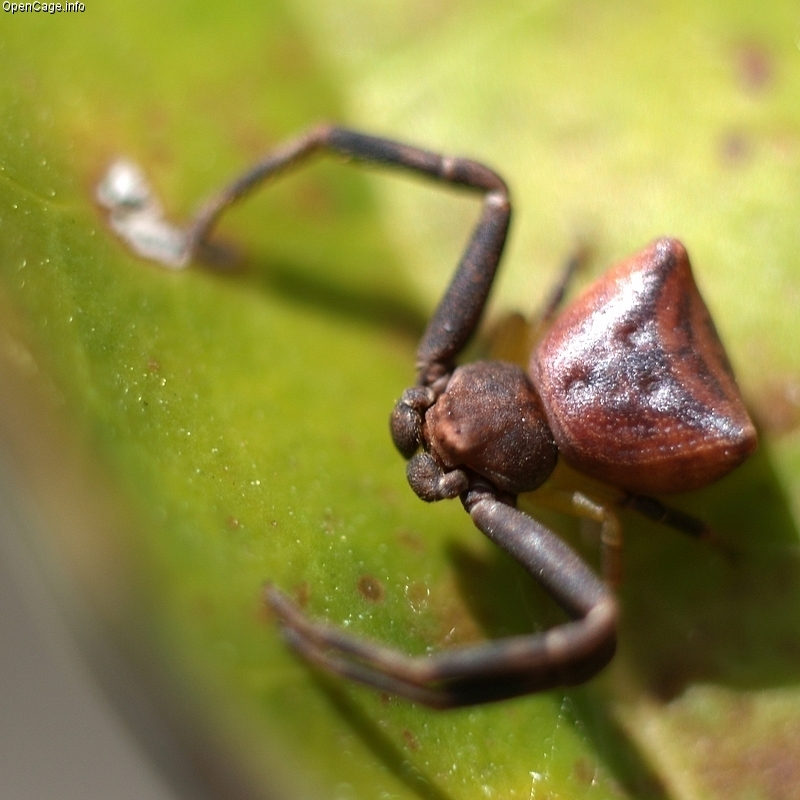
female P. undulatus

== Bibliography ==
- Schrank, F. von P., 1795 - Naturhistorische und ökonomische Briefe über das Donaumoor. Mannheim, pp. 133–148
- Schrank, F. von P., 1803 - Fauna Boica. Durch dachte Geschichte der in Baiern einheimischen und Zahmen Tiere. Landshut vol.3 (1), pp. 229–244
- Walckenaer, C.A., 1805 - Tableau des aranéides ou caractères essentiels des tribus, genres, familles et races que renferme le genre Aranea de Linné, avec la désignation des espèces comprises dans chacune de ces divisions. Paris, 88pp.
- Prach, H., 1866 - Monographie der Thomisiden (Krabben-spinnen) der Gegend von Prag, mit einem Anhange, das Verzeichniiss der Umgebung unserer Haupstadt aufgefunden Araneen enthaltend. Verhandlungen der Kaiserlich-Königlichen Zoologisch-Botanischen Gesellschaft in Wien vol.16, pp. 597–638
- Koch, L., 1878b - Kaukasische Arachnoiden. In: Schneider, O. (ed.) Naturwissenschaftliche Beiträge zur Kenntniss der Kaukasusländer. Dresden vol.3, pp. 36–71
- Basu, B.D., 1964a - Diagnosis of two new species of Pistius (Thomisidae: Araneae: Arachnida) from India. Journal of the Bengal Natural History Society vol.32, pp. 104–109
- Basu, B.D., 1965a - Four new species of the spider genus Pistius Simon (Arachnida: Araneae: Thomisidae) from India. Proceedings of the Zoological Society, Calcutta vol.18, pp. 71–77
- Tikader, B.K., 1970 - Spider fauna of Sikkim. Records of the Zoological Survey of India vol.64, pp. 1–83
- Tikader, B.K., 1971a - Revision of Indian crab spiders (Araneae: Thomisidae). Memoirs of the Zoological Survey of India vol.15 (8), pp. 1–90.
- Tikader, B.K., 1980a - Thomisidae (Crab-spiders). Fauna India (Araneae) vol.1, pp. 1–247
- Brignoli, P.M., 1983c - A catalogue of the Araneae described between 1940 and 1981. Manchester University Press, 755pp.
- Izmailova, M.V., 1989 - [Fauna of Spiders of South Part of Eastern Siberia]. Irkutsk State University Publishing, 184pp.
- Buchar, J. & Thaler, K., 1995b - Zur Variation der Kopulationsorgane von Pistius truncatus (Pallas) (Araneida, Thomisidae) in Mitteleuropa. Linzer Biologische Beiträge vol.27, pp. 653–663.
- Kumari, M. & Mittal, O.P., 1999 - A new species of crab spiders of the genus Pistius (Araneae: Thomisidae) from India. Research Bulletin of the Panjab University vol.48, pp. 17–19
- Saha, S. & Raychaudhuri, D., 2007d - Crab spiders (Araneae: Thomisidae) of Jaldapara Wildlife Sanctuary, Jalpaiguri, West Bengal - I. Journal of the Bombay Natural History Society vol.104, pp. 58–63
- Tang, G. & Li, S.Q., 2010b - Crab spiders from Xishuangbanna, Yunnan Province, China (Araneae, Thomisidae). Zootaxa n.2703, pp. 1–105
