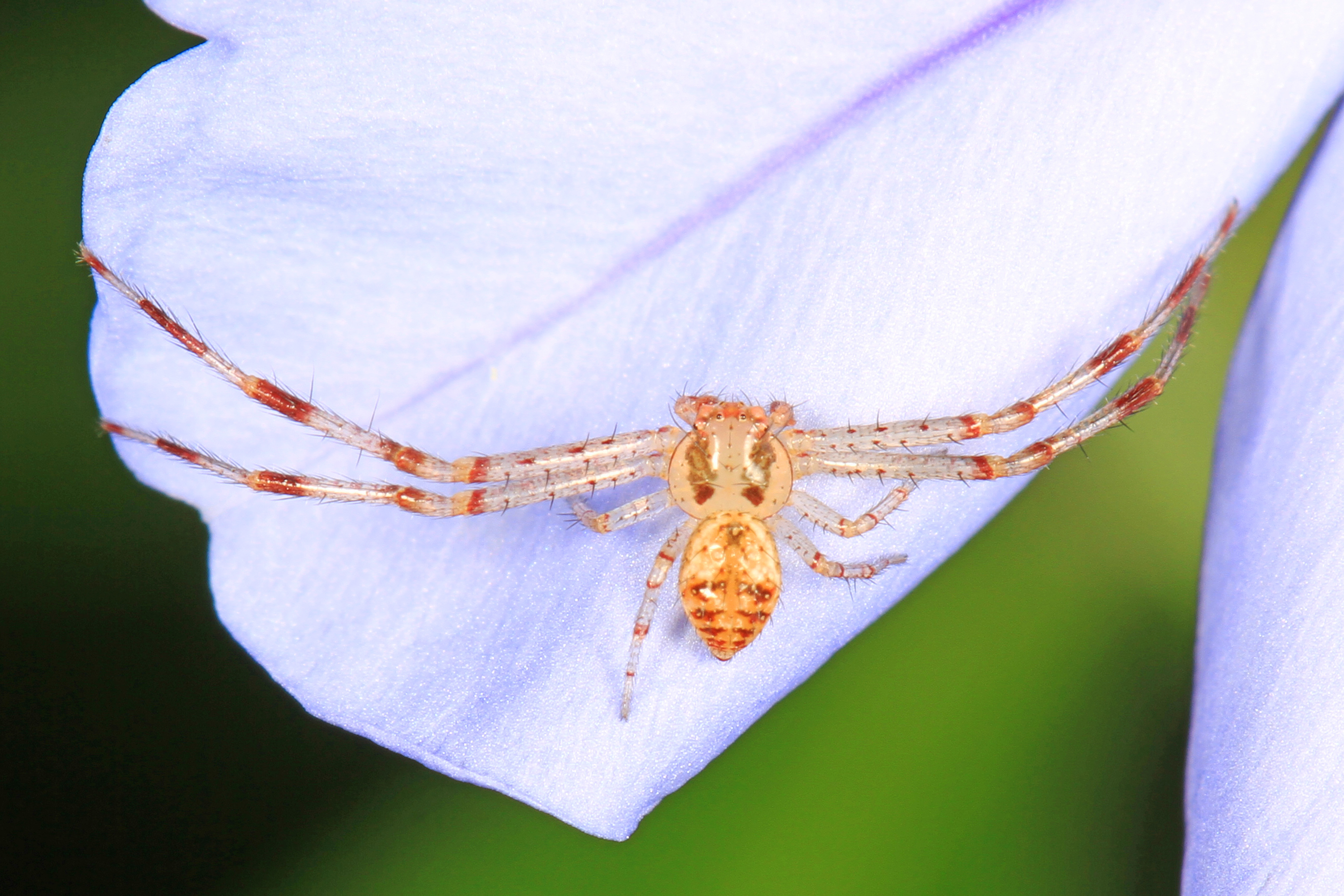

Scientific classification
- Domain: Eukaryota
- Kingdom: Animalia
- Phylum: Arthropoda
- Subphylum: Chelicerata
- Class: Arachnida
- Order: Araneae
- Infraorder: Araneomorphae
- Family: Thomisidae
- Genus: Misumenops
- Species: M. bellulus

Binomial name
- Misumenops bellulus (Banks, 1896)

= Misumenops bellulus =

Species of spider

Misumenops bellulus is a species of crab spider in the family Thomisidae. It is found in the USA, Cuba, and the Virgin Islands.

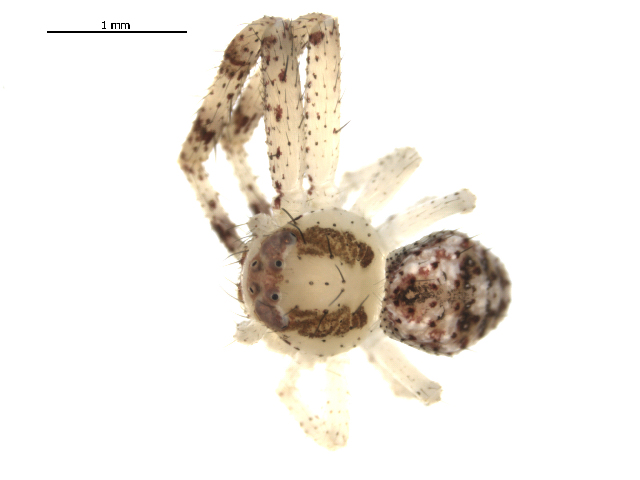
