= Loxoporetes =

Scientific classification
- Kingdom: Animalia
- Phylum: Arthropoda
- Subphylum: Chelicerata
- Class: Arachnida
- Order: Araneae
- Infraorder: Araneomorphae
- Family: Thomisidae
- Genus: Loxoporetes; Kulczyński

Type species
- Loxoporetes nouhuysii

Species
- Loxoporetes colcloughi (Rainbow, 1912); Loxoporetes nouhuysii Kulczyński, 1911

Genus of spiders

Loxoporetes is a genus of spiders in the family Thomisidae. It was first described in 1911 by Kulczyński. As of 2017, it contains 2 species from Australia and New Guinea.
