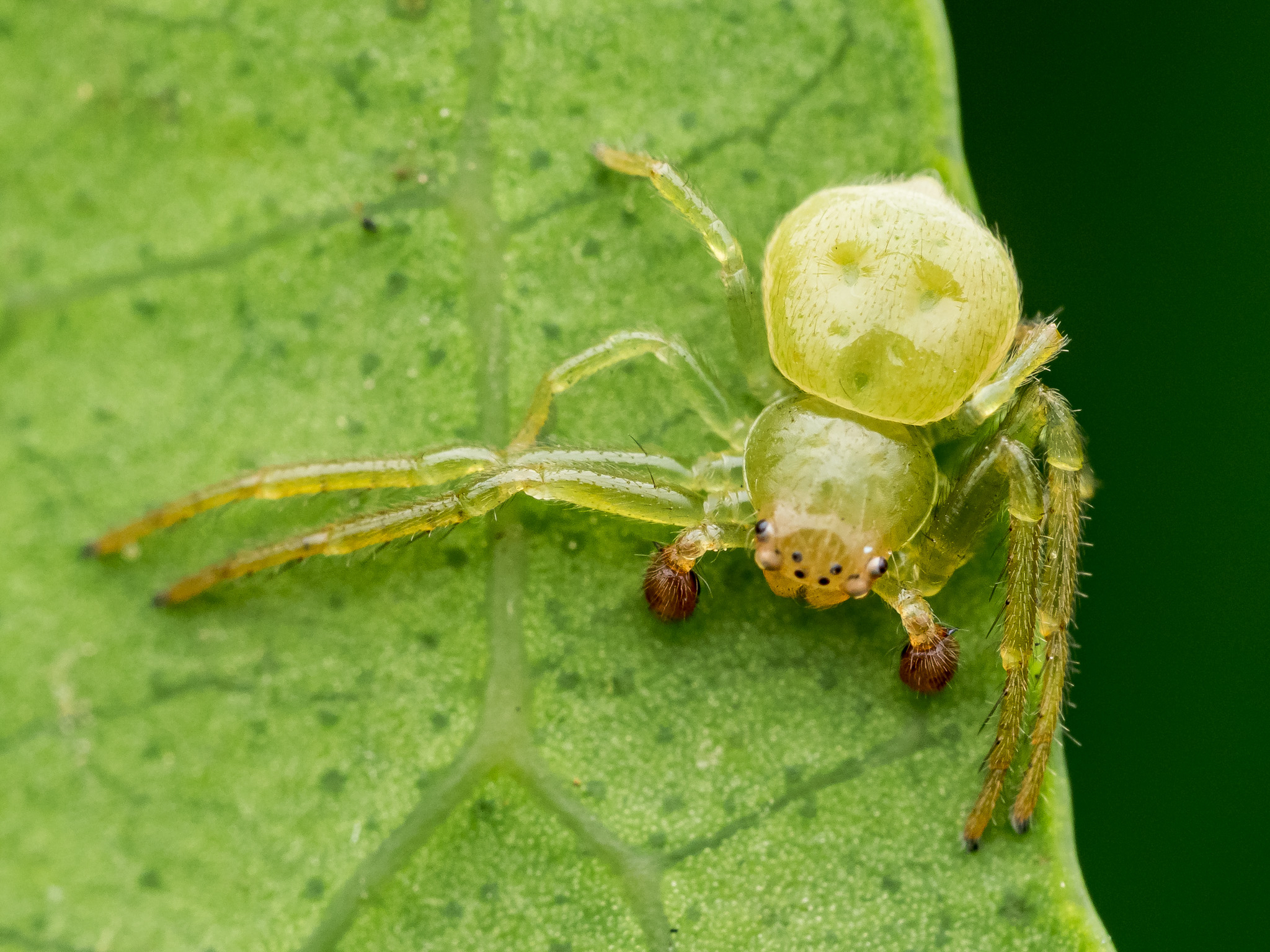

Scientific classification
- Kingdom: Animalia
- Phylum: Arthropoda
- Subphylum: Chelicerata
- Class: Arachnida
- Order: Araneae
- Infraorder: Araneomorphae
- Family: Thomisidae
- Genus: Micromisumenops; Tang & Li, 2010
- Species: M. xiushanensis

Binomial name
- Micromisumenops xiushanensis (Song & Chai, 1990)

= Micromisumenops =

Micromisumenops xiushanensis

Genus of spiders

Micromisumenops is a genus of spiders in the family Thomisidae. It is monotypic, being represented by the single species, Micromisumenops xiushanensis, which is found in China.
