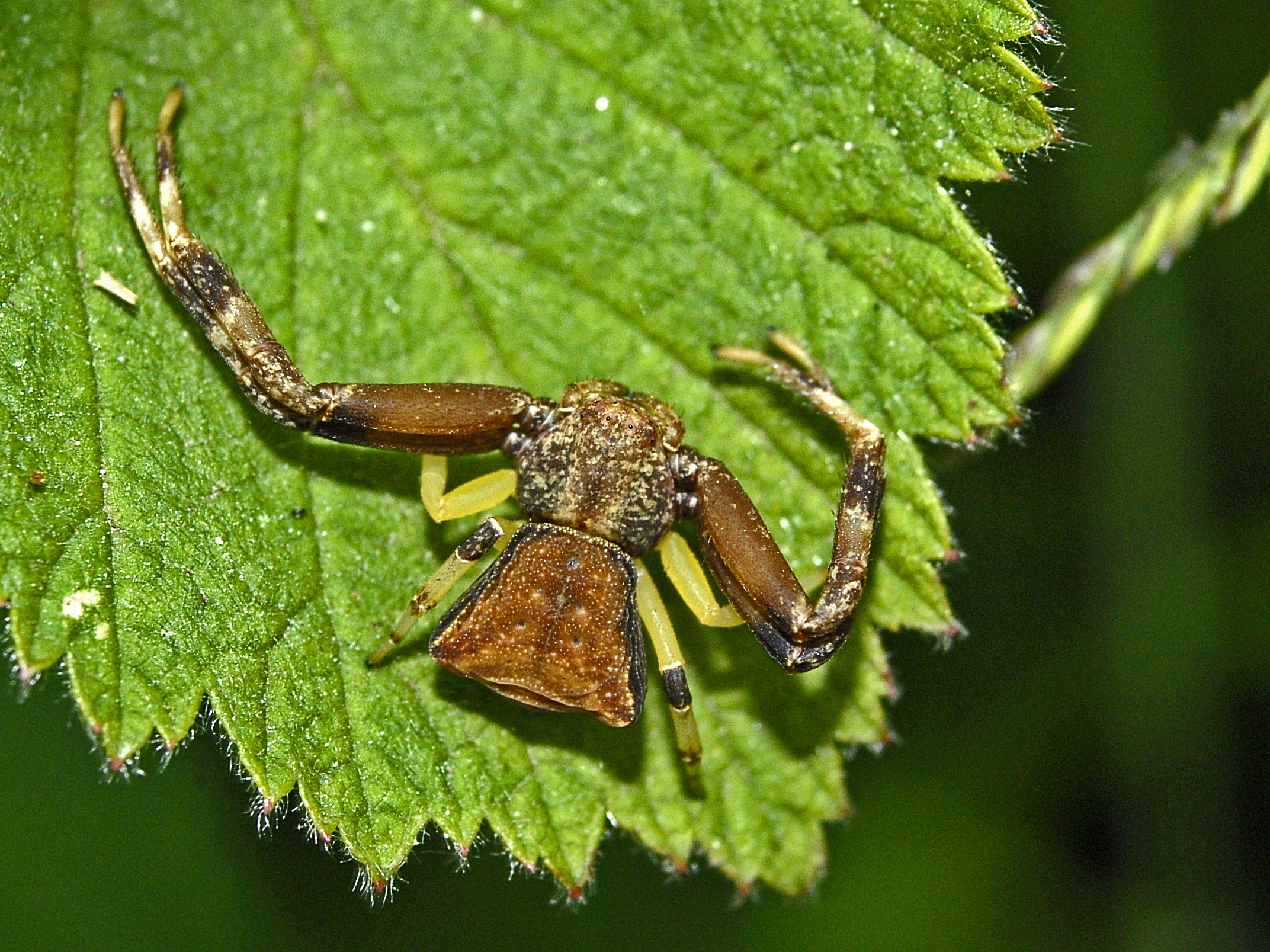
- Female

Scientific classification
- Domain: Eukaryota
- Kingdom: Animalia
- Phylum: Arthropoda
- Subphylum: Chelicerata
- Class: Arachnida
- Order: Araneae
- Infraorder: Araneomorphae
- Family: Thomisidae
- Genus: Pistius
- Species: P. truncatus

Binomial name
- Pistius truncatus (Pallas, 1772)

= Pistius truncatus =

Species of spider

Pistius truncatus is a species of crab spiders belonging to the family Thomisidae.

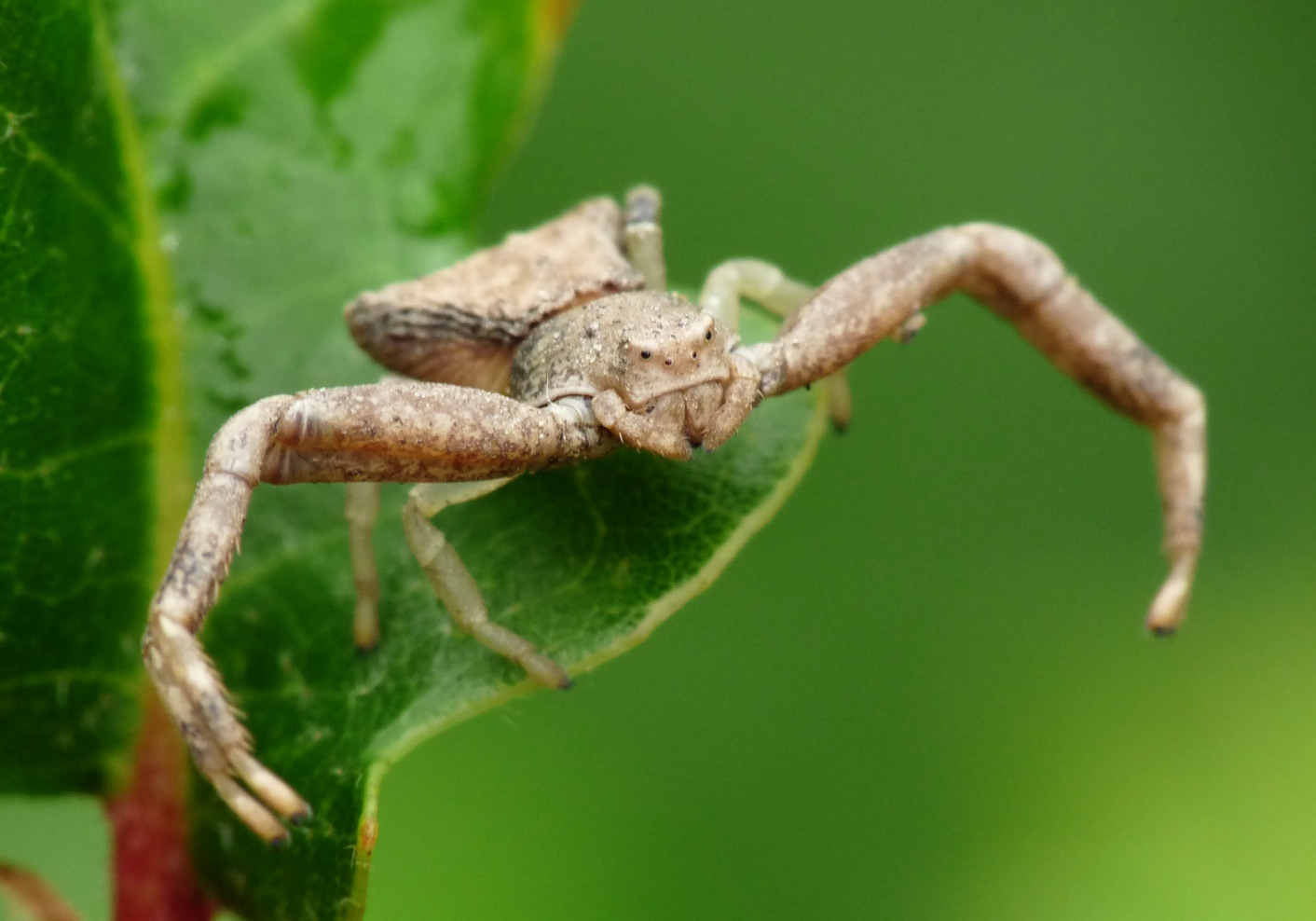
P. truncatus

== Description ==
Pistius truncatus can reach a length of about 4–5 millimetres (0.16–0.20 in) in males, while females can reach 8–9 millimetres (0.31–0.35 in). The spider has small eyes and abdomen is much widened in females.

Adults can be found from May to June.

== Distribution and habitat ==
This species has a palaearctic distribution. It is widespread in central and western Europe. It occurs in bushes, mainly in small scrubby oaks and in forest edges.
