= Kubah National Park =

National park in Sarawak, Malaysia

- IUCN category II (national park)
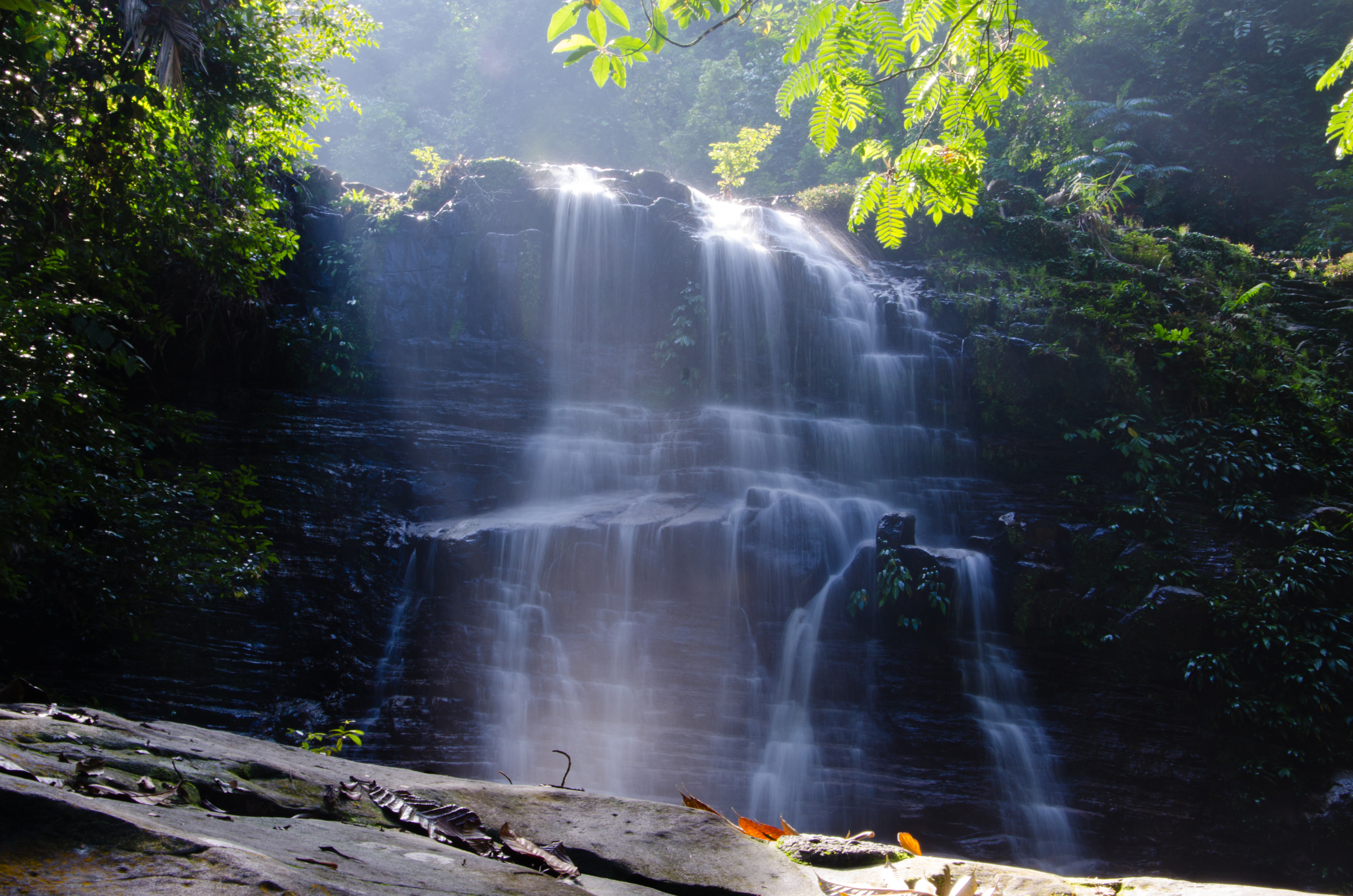
- Kubah waterfall

- Location within Borneo
- Location: Sarawak, Malaysia
- Nearest city: Kuching
- Coordinates: 1°35′51″N 110°11′39″E
- Area: 2,230 ha (8.6 sq mi)
- Established: 1989
- Visitors: 45,000 (in 1994)
- Governing body: Sarawak Forestry Corporation

Kubah National Park (Malay: Taman Negara Kubah) is a national park in Sarawak, Malaysia. It is located in the Matang Range, approximately 20 km (12 mi) from Kuching. The park, which spans 2,230 hectares (5,500 acres), is home to three notable sandstone peaks that can be seen from the city on clear days: Gunung Serapi, Gunung Selang, and Gunung Sendok. The park's landscape consists primarily of dipterocarp forest, with areas of kerangas and scrub forest interspersed throughout. This varied terrain supports a wide range of plant and animal life, including numerous palm species, rare orchids and ferns, as well as bearded pigs, hornbills, squirrels, mouse deer, reptiles, and amphibians.

== Geography ==
The Kubah National Park is located west of Kuching and can be reached by local bus in about forty minutes. It covers an area of 22 square kilometres (8.5 sq mi) and is part of the Matang Range. It is accompanied by the Matang Family Park, providing picnic and barbecuing opportunities beside a river, and the Matang Wildlife Centre, where orangutans and other animals, bred in captivity, are trained to be released into the wild.

== History ==
The park was gazetted in 1989, largely due to its exceptional diversity of palms. The peak visitation was reached during the Visit Malaysia Year campaign in 1994, with more than 45,000 local visitors being recorded. In subsequent years, visitation dropped to below 10,000 annually. It is only in recent years that Kubah has begun to attract foreign visitors, though they remain small in number.

== Flora and fauna ==
Kubah National Park is also famous for its palm diversity with 98 species in its compound, which is one of the richest palm habitats in the world. While the park was gazetted primarily for this reason, its biodiversity extends beyond palms. The area also supports mixed dipterocarp and kerangas forests, contributing to a wider range of plant species, including members of the Ficus genus. The nearby Matang Wildlife Centre, also a part of the park, shelters orangutans and other animals undergoing rehabilitation for return to the wild.

In addition to its botanical richness, the park is home to various animal species. These include the Bornean narrow-mouthed frog (Microhyla borneensis), pill millipedes, the fairy pitta (Pitta nympha), and the rufous-winged fulvetta (Stachyris erythroptera rufa). A number of stick insects have been described from here, including Acacus braggi which is only known from Gunung Serapi.

== Recreation ==
There is a network of hiking and trekking paths in Kubah National Park that range in length and difficulty. Gunung Serapi Road, which connects the park headquarters to a telecommunications tower at the peak of Gunung Serapi, is where a number of paths start. Although there are restrictions on car access, pedestrians can use the road, which also links to trails like the Rayu and Waterfall paths. Colour-coded trails range in length from the 255-meter Palmetum to the 5-kilometre Summit Trail, with estimated walking times ranging from 30 minutes to more than three hours.
