= Erissoides =

Scientific classification
- Kingdom: Animalia
- Phylum: Arthropoda
- Subphylum: Chelicerata
- Class: Arachnida
- Order: Araneae
- Infraorder: Araneomorphae
- Family: Thomisidae
- Genus: Erissoides; Mello-Leitão, 1929

Type species
- E. striatus Mello-Leitão, 1929

Species
- E. striatus Mello-Leitão, 1929 – Brazil; E. vittatus Mello-Leitão, 1949 – Brazil

Genus of spiders

Erissoides is a genus of South American crab spiders that was first described by Cândido Firmino de Mello-Leitão in 1929. As of September 2020 it contains two species, both found in Brazil: E. striatus and E. vittatus.

== See also ==
- List of Thomisidae species
