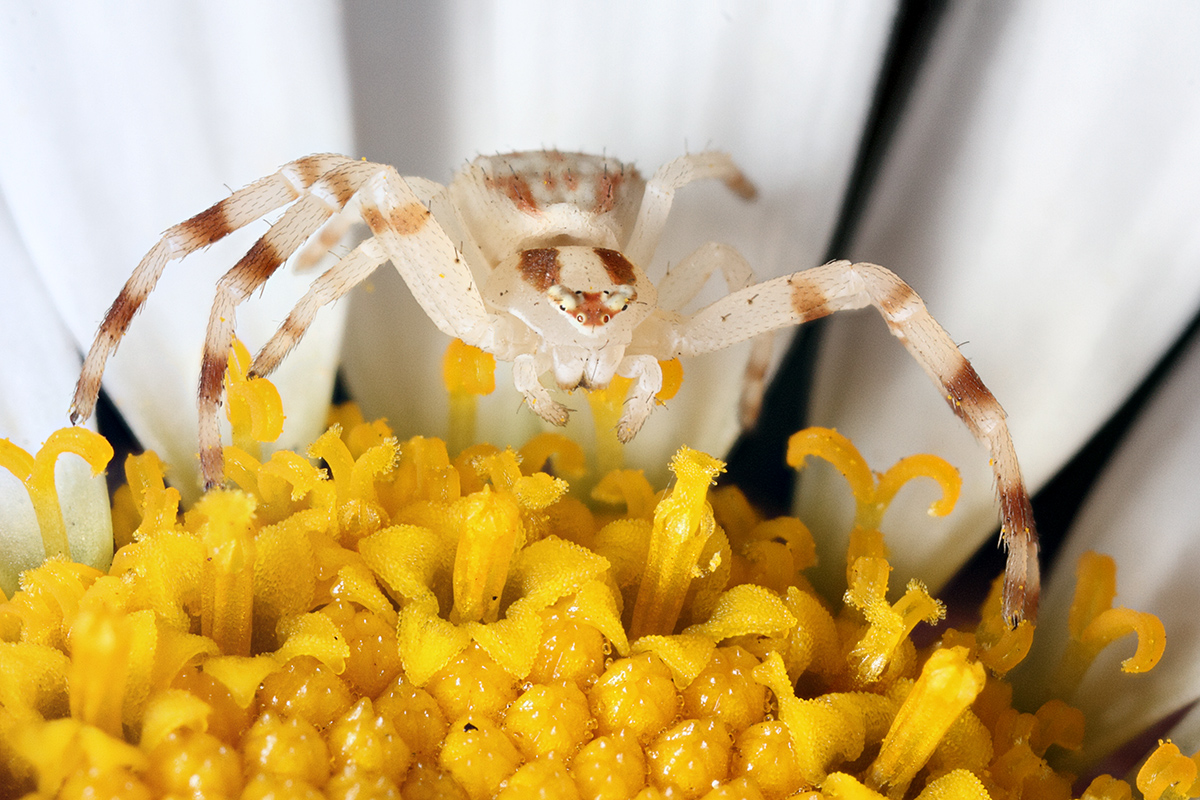

Scientific classification
- Kingdom: Animalia
- Phylum: Arthropoda
- Subphylum: Chelicerata
- Class: Arachnida
- Order: Araneae
- Infraorder: Araneomorphae
- Family: Thomisidae
- Genus: Zygometis; Simon, 1901
- Species: Z. xanthogaster

Binomial name
- Zygometis xanthogaster (L. Koch, 1875)

Synonyms
- Zygometis albiceris; Zygometis cristulata; Zygometis javana; Zygometis lactea

= Zygometis =

Genus of spiders

Zygometis is a genus of spider in the family Thomisidae described by Simon in 1901, containing the sole species Zygometis xanthogaster, or the milky flower spider or white flower spider, with a distribution from Thailand to Australia (including Lord Howe Island). They are ambush predators.

== Description ==
They are cream-white in colour, with brownish-red lines on the cephalothorax and abdomen. This coloration help them camouflage onto white flowers to ambush their prey. Females are 6.5 mm, while males are 3 mm.

== Habitat ==
In Australia, they live from coastal forests to semi-arid areas. It is recorded in altitudes up to 661.5 m.

== Diet & ecology ==
They are "too small" to harm humans, and prey on insects by ambush.
