= Ledouxia =

Scientific classification
- Kingdom: Animalia
- Phylum: Arthropoda
- Subphylum: Chelicerata
- Class: Arachnida
- Order: Araneae
- Infraorder: Araneomorphae
- Family: Thomisidae
- Genus: Ledouxia
- Species: L. alluaudi

Binomial name
- Ledouxia alluaudi (Simon, 1898)

Genus of spiders

Ledouxia is a genus of spiders in the family Thomisidae. It was first described in 2004 by Lehtinen. As of 2017, it contains only one species, Ledouxia alluaudi, found in Mauritius and Réunion.
