= Demogenes =

Scientific classification
- Kingdom: Animalia
- Phylum: Arthropoda
- Subphylum: Chelicerata
- Class: Arachnida
- Order: Araneae
- Infraorder: Araneomorphae
- Family: Thomisidae
- Genus: Demogenes; Simon, 1895

Type species
- D. lugens (Thorell, 1881)

Species
- 5, see text

Synonyms
- Senoculifer Balogh, 1936

Genus of spiders

Demogenes is a genus of crab spiders that was first described by Eugène Louis Simon in 1895.

== Species ==
As of August 2020 it contains five species, found on Vanuatu, in Papua New Guinea, and on the Andaman Islands:

- Demogenes andamanensis (Tikader, 1980) – India (Andaman Is.)
- Demogenes conivulvus (Balogh, 1936) – New Guinea
- Demogenes heterophthalmus (Berland, 1938) – Vanuatu
- Demogenes lugens (Thorell, 1881) (type) – New Guinea
- Demogenes simplicibulbis (Balogh, 1936) – New Guinea

== See also ==
- List of Thomisidae species
