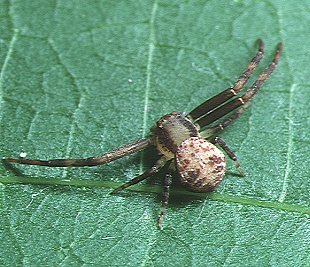
- E. kumadai, juvenile

Scientific classification
- Kingdom: Animalia
- Phylum: Arthropoda
- Subphylum: Chelicerata
- Class: Arachnida
- Order: Araneae
- Infraorder: Araneomorphae
- Family: Thomisidae
- Genus: Ebelingia; Lehtinen, 2004

Type species
- E. kumadai (Ono, 1985)

Species
- E. forcipata (Song & Zhu, 1993) – China; E. hubeiensis (Song & Zhao, 1994) – China; E. kumadai (Ono, 1985) – Russia (Far East), China, Korea, Japan (mainland, Okinawa)

= Ebelingia =

Genus of spiders

Ebelingia is a genus of Asian crab spiders consisting of two species separated from Mecaphesa due to their distinct abdominal pattern and the unique color pattern of their body and legs. As of April 2022 it contains three species found throughout Asia: E. forcipata, E. hubeiensis and E. kumadai.

== See also ==
- List of Thomisidae species
