= Metadiaea =

Scientific classification
- Domain: Eukaryota
- Kingdom: Animalia
- Phylum: Arthropoda
- Subphylum: Chelicerata
- Class: Arachnida
- Order: Araneae
- Infraorder: Araneomorphae
- Family: Thomisidae
- Genus: Metadiaea
- Species: M. fidelis

Binomial name
- Metadiaea fidelis Mello-Leitão, 1929

Genus of spiders

Metadiaea is a genus of spiders in the family Thomisidae. It was first described in 1929 by Mello-Leitão. As of 2017, it contains only one species, Metadiaea fidelis, from Brazil.
