= Runcinioides =

Scientific classification
- Kingdom: Animalia
- Phylum: Arthropoda
- Subphylum: Chelicerata
- Class: Arachnida
- Order: Araneae
- Infraorder: Araneomorphae
- Family: Thomisidae
- Genus: Runcinioides; Mello-Leitão

Type species
- Runcinioides argenteus

Species
- Runcinioides argenteus Mello-Leitão, 1929; Runcinioides litteratus (Piza, 1933); Runcinioides pustulatus Mello-Leitão, 1929; Runcinioides souzai Soares, 1942

Genus of spiders

Runcinioides is a genus of spiders in the family Thomisidae. It was first described in 1929 by Mello-Leitão. As of 2017, it contains four species found in Brazil and French Guiana.
