= Henriksenia labuanica =

Scientific classification
- Kingdom: Animalia
- Phylum: Arthropoda
- Subphylum: Chelicerata
- Class: Arachnida
- Order: Araneae
- Infraorder: Araneomorphae
- Family: Thomisidae
- Genus: Henriksenia
- Species: H. labuanica

Binomial name
- Henriksenia labuanica Striffler & Rembold, 2009; replacement name

Synonyms
- Misumena nepenthicola Pocock, 1898; nomen nudum; Misumenops nepenthicola (Pocock, 1898); based on a nomen nudum; Misumenops nepenthicola Bristowe, 1930; preoccupied by Fage, 1928

Species of spider

Henriksenia labuanica is a species of spider in the family Thomisidae, found in Malaysia (Borneo).

== Taxonomy ==
The species was first named by Reginald Innes Pocock in 1898 as Misumena nepenthicola; however, he did not give a diagnosis, so this is a nomen nudum. In 1930, W. S. Bristowe first described the species, giving it the name Misumenops nepenthicola. However, this name had already been used by Louis Fage in 1928 for a different species, so it is a junior homonym. An application to have Bristowe's name conserved was rejected, and in 2009, Striffler and Rembold published the replacement name Henriksenia labuanica – the only legitimate name that applies to the species.
