= Henriksenia =

Scientific classification
- Kingdom: Animalia
- Phylum: Arthropoda
- Subphylum: Chelicerata
- Class: Arachnida
- Order: Araneae
- Infraorder: Araneomorphae
- Family: Thomisidae
- Genus: Henriksenia; Lehtinen, 2004

Type species
- H. hilaris (Thorell, 1877)

Species
- See text.

Genus of spiders

Henriksenia is a genus of crab spiders that was first described by Pekka T. Lehtinen in 2004.

== Species ==
As of October 2023, the World Spider Catalog accepted four species:

- Henriksenia hilaris (Thorell, 1877) (type species) – India to Philippines, Indonesia (Sulawesi), New Guinea
- Henriksenia labuanica Striffler & Rembold, 2009 – Malaysia (Borneo)
- Henriksenia nepenthicola (Fage, 1928) – Singapore
- Henriksenia thienemanni (Reimoser, 1931) – Indonesia (Sumatra)
