= Celer =

Celer may refer to:

== People ==
- Celer (builder), foreman appointed by Romulus to oversee the building of Rome's first walls.
- Quintus Caecilius Metellus Celer, consul of the Roman Republic, 60 BC
- Publius Egnatius Celer, first century Stoic philosopher
- Servius Asinius Celer, Roman senator, died AD46
- Celer (magister officiorum), 6th century Byzantine minister
- Saint Gelert, 7th century Welsh saint

== Biology ==
- Misumenops celer, the celer crab spider
- Thermococcus celer, a species of extremely thermophilic Archaea
- Laosaurus (Laosaurus celer), a genus of hypsilophodont dinosaur
- Microvenator (Microvenator celer), a genus of dinosaur from the Early Cretaceous Cloverly Formation
- Trichoniscus pusillus (Philougria celer), one of the five most common species of woodlouse in the British Isles

== Other ==
- Celer (group), is an American drone music project formed in 2005 by composer and musician Will Long and Danielle Baquet-Long.
- Chery Celer, a subcompact car

== See also ==
- Cele (disambiguation)
- Celeres, a personal armed guard maintained by Romulus
- Celerity (disambiguation)
- Celeron
- Celery
- Cellar (disambiguation)
- Celler (disambiguation)
- Cello
