= Cele =

Cele may refer to:

== Places ==
- Cele - a village in KwaZulu-Natal, South Africa
- Qira County (or Cele County), Hotan Prefecture, Xinjiang, China
- Cele, Texas, USA
- Célé, river in the Cantal and Lot départements of southwestern France

== Other ==
- Cele (name)
- -cele, as a suffix, refers to a tumor or hernia, such as meningocele of the meninges

== See also ==
- Celer (disambiguation)
- Celes (disambiguation)
- Celebrity (disambiguation)
- Céilidh
