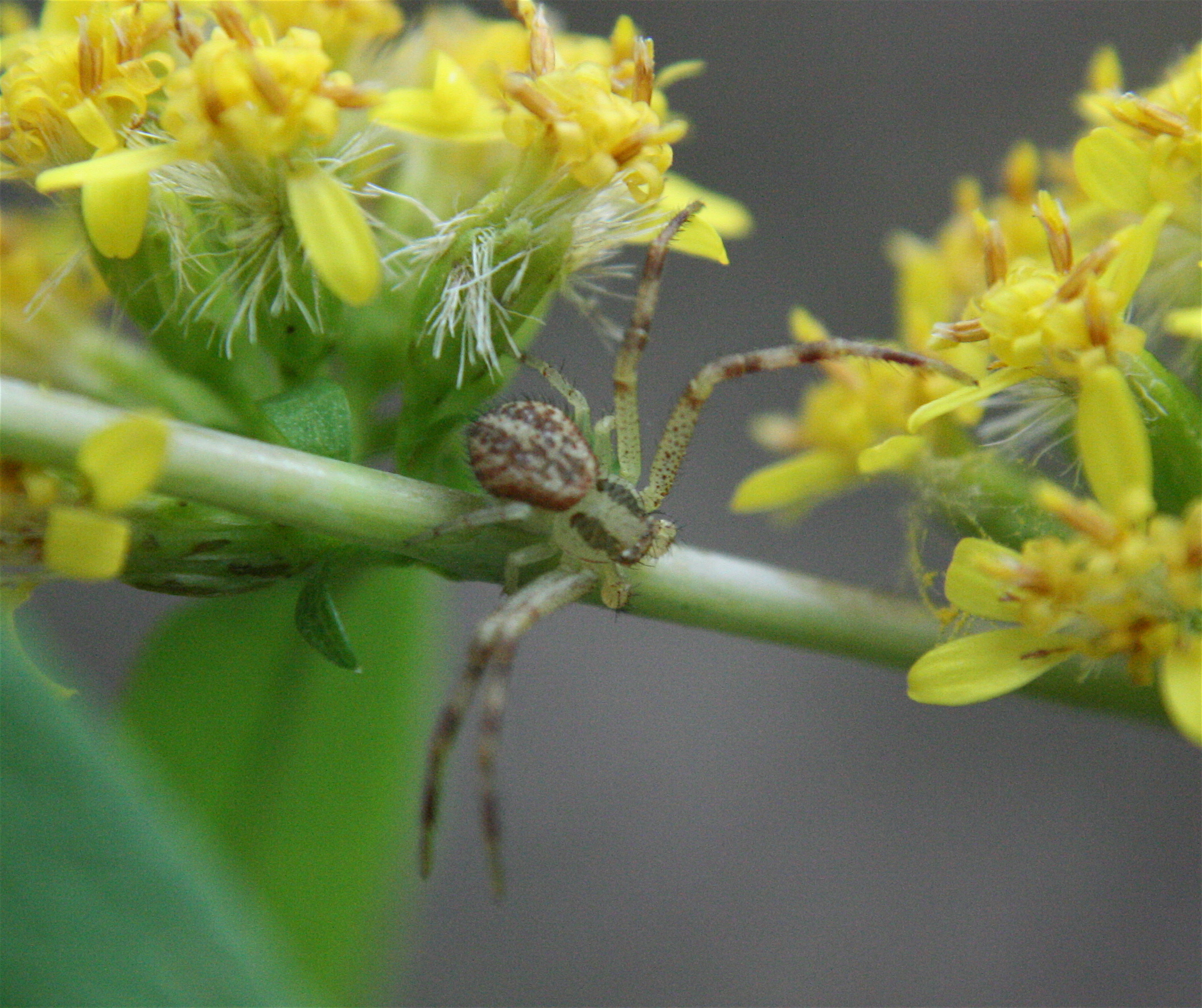

Scientific classification
- Kingdom: Animalia
- Phylum: Arthropoda
- Subphylum: Chelicerata
- Class: Arachnida
- Order: Araneae
- Infraorder: Araneomorphae
- Family: Thomisidae
- Genus: Mecaphesa
- Species: M. celer

Binomial name
- Mecaphesa celer (Hentz, 1847)

= Mecaphesa celer =

Species of spider

Mecaphesa celer, known generally as the swift crab spider, is a species of crab spider in the family Thomisidae. Its range is quite large, and it is found throughout much of North and Central America.

M. celer are sit-and-wait predators who hide out on the flowers and upper stalks of plants, waiting for prey to pass by. As a variety of crab spider, they have characteristically long first two pairs of legs which they use to grab prey. M. celer spin webs only for creating egg sacs and as part of mating, not for hunting.

The spider is a notable example of a species that displays sexual size dimorphism (SSD), a phenomenon in which one sex is significantly larger than the other. In the case of M. celer, females are dramatically larger than males, sometimes over twice their size, making the species a case of extreme sexual size dimorphism.

M. celer also displays sexual cannibalism, as the females have been observed to eat their male mates if the males are still in proximity of the females after copulation.

Like other spiders within the Thomisidae family, M. celer are an important pest control species for agriculture since they hunt at the upper parts of crop plants where the grains or other harvested products grow. They thereby prey upon and protect agricultural products from potential pests like aphids.

This species was formerly a member of the genus Misumenops, and was recently moved to Mecaphesa. Several older website and journal entries about the spider can still be found under the species name Misumenops celer, as with several of the references used in this article.

== Description ==
Like many members of the Thomisidae family, M. celer have the characteristic long front two pairs of legs and short back two pairs. Adults show sexual dimorphism not only in size but in color, and mature males are often darker than females and have distinctive red bands on their legs. Males also tend to have whiter abdomens with four or more pairs of brown spots that form a V-shape, starting from the mid-abdomen and terminating at end of the abdomen. The male body is also covered in noticeable dark hairs (setae). There can be difficulty in identifying M. celer from a male alone; males of M. celer appear quite similar to males of Mecaphesa dubia and Mecaphesa rothi, and due to natural variation in physical traits that can occur within a single species, distinguishing between these three species can be quite difficult. Female M. celer, meanwhile, are more distinct from other species. They tend to be yellow in color and have large, round abdomens much larger than their heads, unlike the male, whose abdomen and head are roughly equal in size. Females can actually vary in their coloration, with one variant being a bright, solid yellow with barely any brown spotting, another variant being yellow with reddish-brown streaking on the abdomen, and a third variant being completely white with dull brown streaking on the abdomen.

== Population structure, speciation, and phylogeny ==
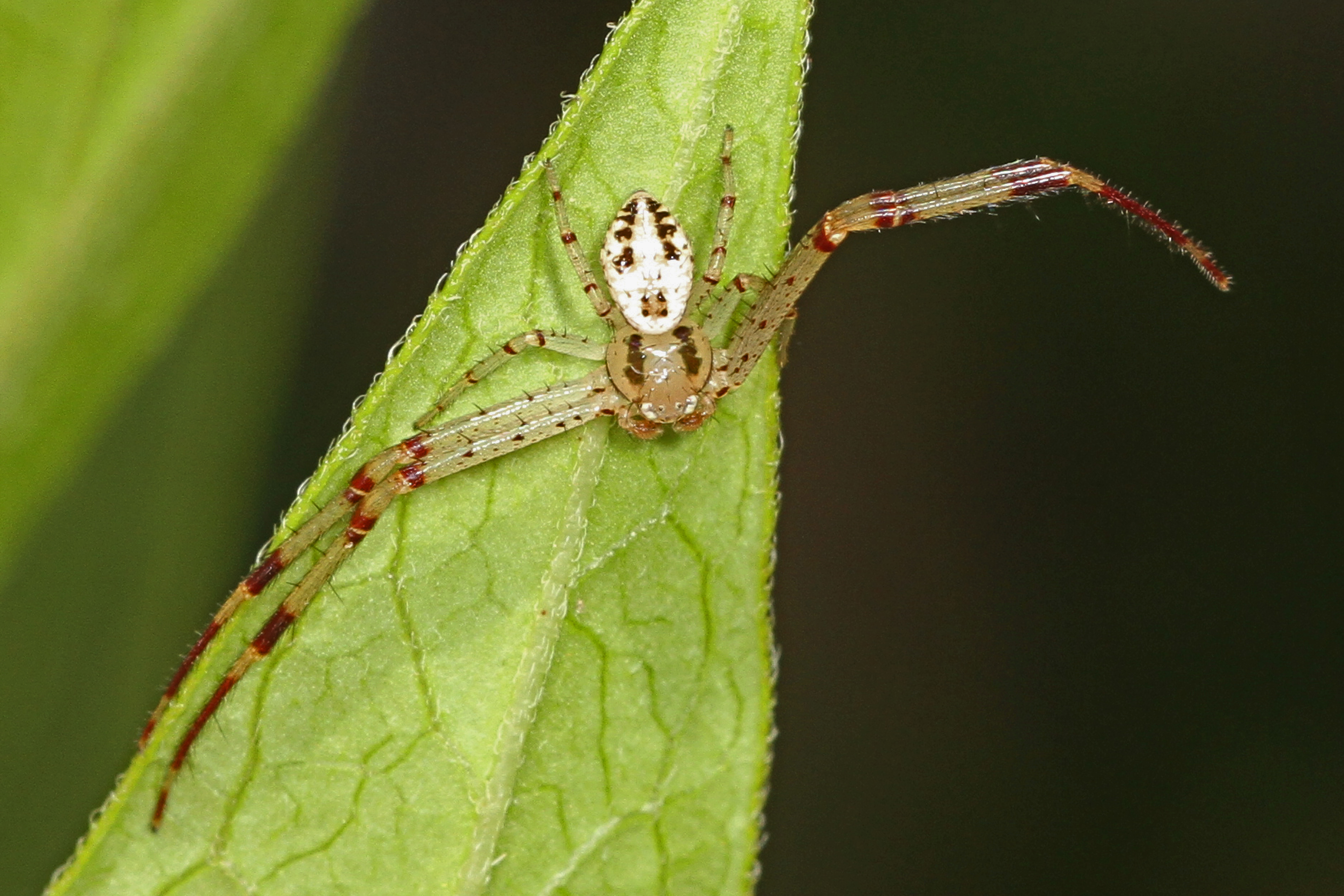
Male swift crab spider, Mecaphesa celer

=== Phylogeny ===
The phylogeny of this species of spider has not been explicitly mapped and displayed on a phylogenetic tree.

=== Subspecies ===
These three subspecies belong to the species Mecaphesa celer:

- Mecaphesa celer celer (Hentz, 1847)^{i g}
- Mecaphesa celer olivacea (Franganillo, 1930)^{i c g}
- Mecaphesa celer punctata (Franganillo, 1926)^{i c g}

Data sources: i = ITIS, c = Catalogue of Life, g = GBIF, b = Bugguide.net

== Habitat and distribution ==
=== Habitat ===
As an ambushing spider which often preys upon pollinating insects, M. celer usually lives in close association with flowers and upper plant parts. The spider is often seen on shrubs, bushes, and small trees, as well as on crop plants, such as sorghum, cotton, and alfalfa. One study of an Eastern Texas cotton field found that M. celer comprised 5.3% of all spiders collected in the field, indicating its abundance in agricultural fields.

=== Geographic distribution ===
M. celer is a nearctic spider species distributed widely across the North American continent (see the purple area in the map below).

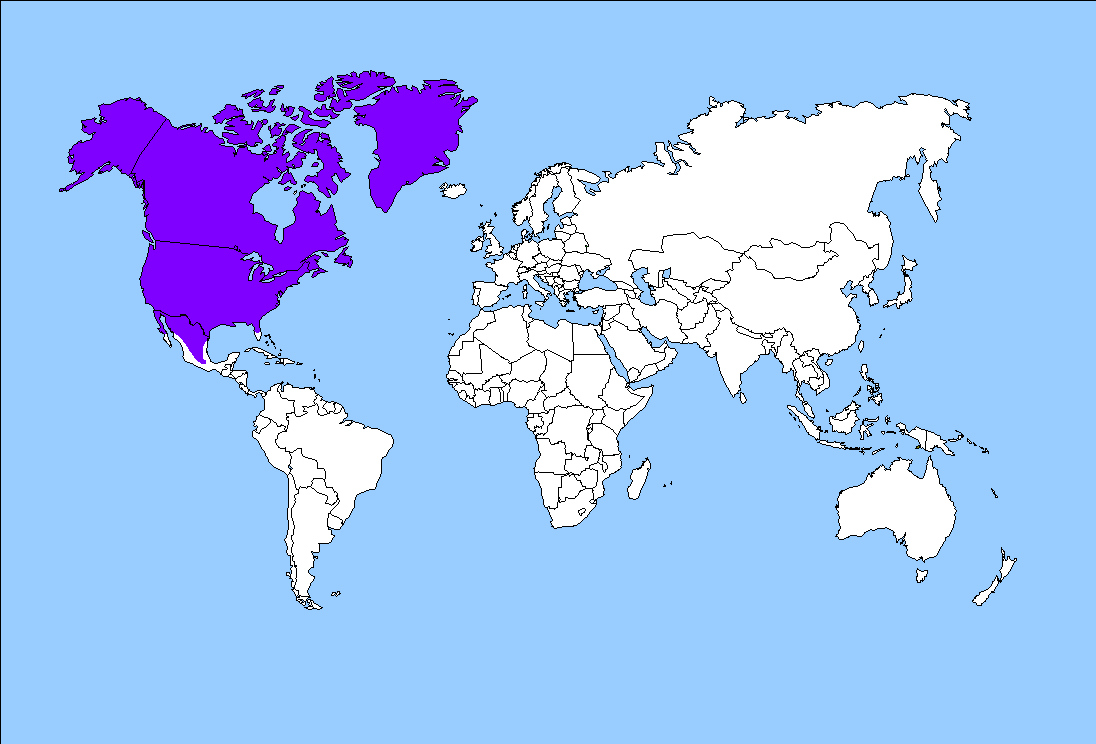
The nearctic realm

== Sexual size dimorphism ==
M. celer exhibits strong female-biased sexual size dimorphism (SSD), with males being roughly half the size of females and having a mass that is often less than 1/10th the average mass of a female. The exact selection pressures that have resulted in such dramatic size difference between the sexes in this species are still not well-known, and according to research, it does not appear that female-biased SSD in M. celer has evolved for any commonly acknowledged pre- or post-copulatory survival benefits to the male or female.

== Mating ==
=== Female/Male interactions ===
==== Mate choice ====
Virgin M. celer females appear to exercise no mate choice. Experiments have shown that virgin females will almost always accept the first male mate that comes along, showing no preference for smaller size or any other particular trait. Only after females have mated once do they appear to then become choosy, and many seem to reject mating attempts by subsequent males who come along, even attacking or killing male suitors.

==== Number of nates ====
It seems that M. celer males mate multiply more often than females do. Two studies have shown that males are capable of multiple matings over their lifetimes, but the same two studies are at odds about a female's ability to have multiple mates. The earlier study observed that its females mated only once and that after copulation, a waxy coating was present over the female's epigyne, which the researchers claimed probably prevented successive matings. The more recent study found, however, that while a large fraction of its females refused to mate a second time, 15% still mated a second time, showing that second matings are not impossible in M. celer, even if they are not a preferred behavior.

==== Courting ====
M. celer individuals engage in courtship behavior to indicate receptiveness and willingness to copulate to one another. When recognizing a potential female mate, males vibrate their abdomens and slowly approach the female, gesturing with the front two pairs of legs and the pedipalps. Then, the male touches the female with the same front two pairs of legs, and if the female is receptive, she raises her legs and suspends herself in silk threads to indicate her receptivity to the male.

After the female has accepted the male in this manner, the male climbs over the back (dorsal side) of the female and positions his head and thorax, collectively the prosoma, near the female's epigyne so that his pedipalps are close to it. A few different pre-mating behaviors have been observed among mating pairs of M. celer in a laboratory setting. In some pairs, there was no pre-mating behavior and copulation began immediately. In others, the male would rub the epigyne with his chelicerae before inserting the pedipalps, or the male would wait and rest with his chelicerae hovering over the epigyne.

==== Copulation ====
Copulation occurs in M. celer as it does in many other spider species, with the male inserting the pedipalps into the female's epigyne and pumping seminal fluid into the female. Hence, fertilization occurs internally within the female. During copulation, the hairs on the male's front two pairs of legs have been observed to flicker in sync with the pumping actions in the pedipalps, and occasionally the male may lubricate the embolus, the tip of the pedipalp which penetrates the epigyne, with his chelicerae. After copulation, which usually lasts between roughly 3 and 10 minutes, the male remains on the female until she becomes active again.

==== Sexual cannibalism ====
It appears that M. celer females exhibit sexual cannibalism. Laboratory study has observed that when a male mate is kept in proximity of the female after copulation is complete, the female eventually kills and eats him.

== Interactions with humans and livestock ==
Because M. celer feeds on insects visiting the flowering parts of plants, it can act as a valuable biological agent of insect control in crops. Members of the Thomisidae, as well as Salticidae, Argiopidae, and Oxiopidae spider families, have been shown to feed mainly in the upper part or head of the sorghum crop, where the grain is produced. Because sorghum is grown for the grain it produces, M. celer and other Thomisids provide important protection for farmers against the destruction of the crop's value.
