= M. foliata =

M. foliata may refer to:

- Misumena foliata, a synonym for Misumenops asperatus, a 'flower spider' species
- Myrmekiaphila foliata, a trapdoor spider species in the genus Myrmekiaphila

== See also ==
- Foliata (disambiguation)
