= Mr. Celebrity =

Mr. Celebrity may refer to:

- a manner of addressing a male celebrity
- Mr. Celebrity (1941 film), a U.S. sports comedy film
- Mr. Celebrity (2024 film), a Telegu-language action comedy thriller film from India
- Mr Celebrity, a racehorse at the 2005 Melbourne Cup
- Mr. Celebrity, a dog, a champion boxer raised by Hinda Wausau
- Mr. Celebrity, a character from the TV show Comedy Bang! Bang!; see List of Comedy Bang! Bang! (TV series) episodes
- Mr. Celebrity, a fictional racehorse, the titular character from the film Mr. Celebrity (1941 film)
- Mister Celebrity International, a beauty pageant; see List of beauty pageants

== See also ==
- Celebrity (disambiguation)
