= Public Figures =

Public figures are people who have achieved fame, prominence or notoriety within a society.

Public Figures may also refer to:

- Public Figures (band), Australian punk rock quartet; nominated at the 2026 J Awards
- Public Figures (TV series), American dramedy in development by Quibi

== See also ==
- "Public Figure", song by YoungBoy Never Broke Again from the 2018 album Until Death Call My Name
- Celebrity (disambiguation)
