= Celerity =

Celerity, or celeritas (Latin), may refer to:

- Speed, quickness

== Science and technology ==
- Speed of light, celeritas
- Celerity Computing Inc., defunct San Diego, California vendor
- Celerity IT, a Virginia-based web development consulting group
- Phase velocity, speed of propagation of a wave
- Proper velocity, an alternative way of measuring motion in relativity

== Transport ==
- USS Celeritas (SP-665), a United States Navy patrol vessel
- Mirage Celerity, an American two-seat cabin monoplane
- Celerity (carriage)

== Sport ==
- FC Celeritas Straßburg
- Feyenoord, a Dutch football club in Rotterdam, known as Celeritas 1909–1912
- Celeritas, a Dutch football club in Kampen, active in 1893; see Jasper Warner § Local sports
- Celeritas, a Dutch football club in Rotterdam, active in 1901; see Belgium vs Netherlands Cups § History

== See also ==
- Celery
- Celebrity
- Celer (disambiguation)
