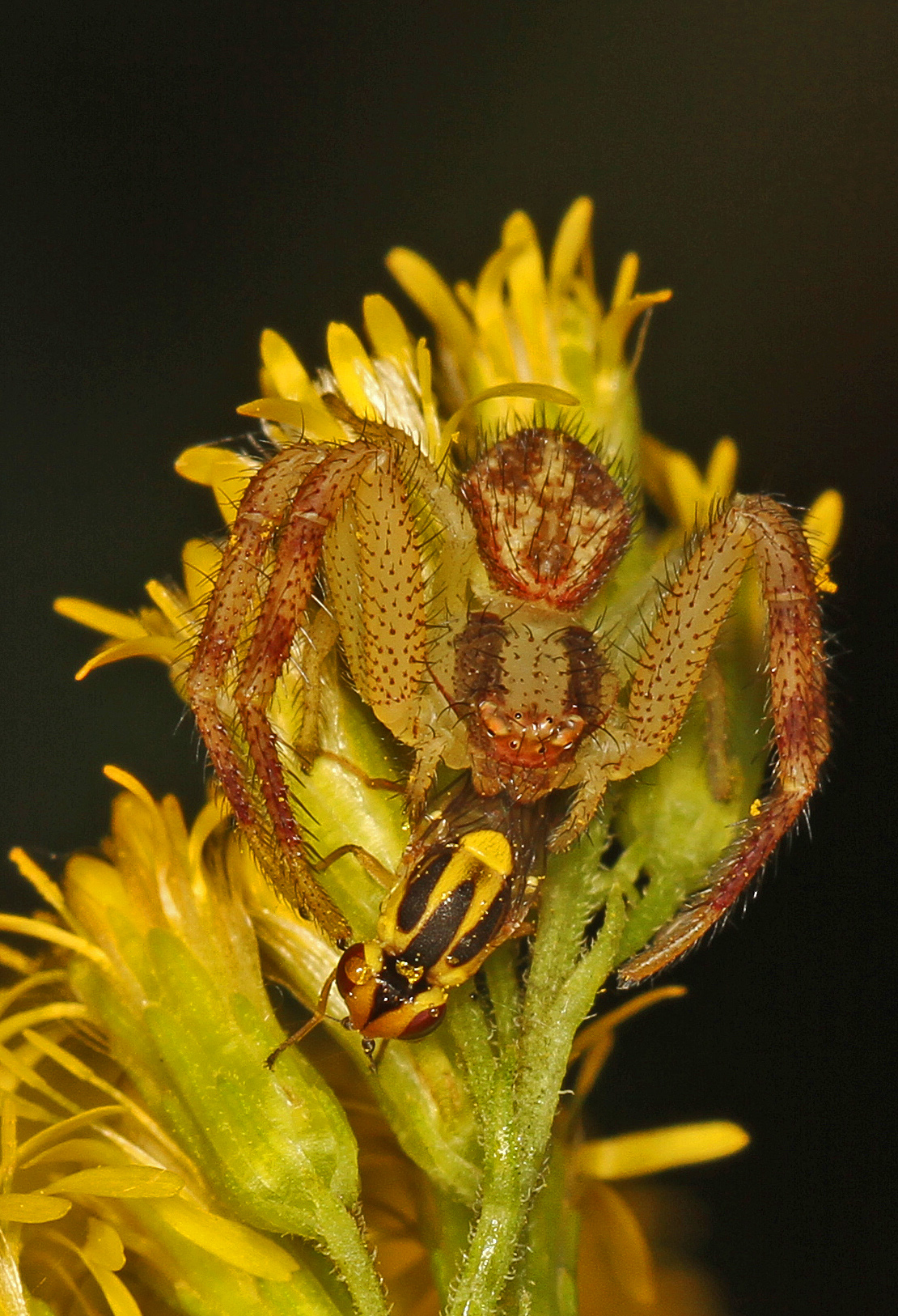
- M. asperata

Scientific classification
- Kingdom: Animalia
- Phylum: Arthropoda
- Subphylum: Chelicerata
- Class: Arachnida
- Order: Araneae
- Infraorder: Araneomorphae
- Family: Thomisidae
- Genus: Mecaphesa; Simon, 1900

Type species
- M. cincta Simon, 1900

Species
- 49, see text

= Mecaphesa =

Genus of spiders

Mecaphesa is a genus of crab spiders that was first described by Eugène Louis Simon in 1900.

== Species ==
As of November 2022 it contains forty-nine species and one subspecies, found in North America, Central America, the Caribbean, South America, and on Hawaii:

- Mecaphesa aikoae (Schick, 1965) – USA
- Mecaphesa anguliventris (Simon, 1900) – Hawaii
- Mecaphesa arida (Suman, 1971) – Hawaii
- Mecaphesa asperata (Hentz, 1847) – North, Central America, Caribbean
- Mecaphesa baltea (Suman, 1971) – Hawaii
- Mecaphesa bubulcus (Suman, 1971) – Puerto Rico
- Mecaphesa californica (Banks, 1896) – USA, Mexico, Hispaniola
- Mecaphesa carletonica (Dondale & Redner, 1976) – USA, Canada
- Mecaphesa cavata (Suman, 1971) – Hawaii
- Mecaphesa celer (Hentz, 1847) – North, Central America
- Mecaphesa cincta Simon, 1900 (type) – Hawaii
- Mecaphesa coloradensis (Gertsch, 1933) – USA, Mexico
- Mecaphesa damnosa (Keyserling, 1880) – Mexico, Guatemala, Panama
- Mecaphesa decora (Banks, 1898) – Mexico, Guatemala
- Mecaphesa deserti (Schick, 1965) – USA, Mexico
- Mecaphesa devia (Gertsch, 1939) – USA
- Mecaphesa discreta (Suman, 1971) – Hawaii
- Mecaphesa dubia (Keyserling, 1880) – USA, Mexico
- Mecaphesa edita (Suman, 1971) – Hawaii
- Mecaphesa facunda (Suman, 1971) – Hawaii
- Mecaphesa gabrielensis (Schick, 1965) – USA
- Mecaphesa gertschi (Kraus, 1955) – El Salvador
- Mecaphesa hiatus (Suman, 1971) – Hawaii
- Mecaphesa imbricata (Suman, 1971) – Hawaii
- Mecaphesa importuna (Keyserling, 1881) – USA
  - Mecaphesa i. belkini (Schick, 1965) – USA
- Mecaphesa inclusa (Banks, 1902) – Ecuador (Galapagos Is.)
- Mecaphesa insulana (Keyserling, 1890) – Hawaii
- Mecaphesa juncta (Suman, 1971) – Hawaii
- Mecaphesa kanakana (Karsch, 1880) – Hawaii
- Mecaphesa lepida (Thorell, 1877) – USA, Canada
- Mecaphesa lowriei (Schick, 1970) – USA
- Mecaphesa naevigera (Simon, 1900) – Hawaii
- Mecaphesa nigrofrenata (Simon, 1900) – Hawaii
- Mecaphesa oreades (Simon, 1900) – Hawaii
- Mecaphesa perkinsi Simon, 1904 – Hawaii
- Mecaphesa persimilis (Kraus, 1955) – El Salvador
- Mecaphesa prosper (O. Pickard-Cambridge, 1896) – Guatemala
- Mecaphesa quercina (Schick, 1965) – USA
- Mecaphesa reddelli Baert, 2013 – Ecuador (Galapagos Is.)
- Mecaphesa revillagigedoensis (Jiménez, 1991) – Mexico
- Mecaphesa rothi (Schick, 1965) – USA
- Mecaphesa rufithorax (Simon, 1904) – Hawaii
- Mecaphesa schlingeri (Schick, 1965) – USA
- Mecaphesa semispinosa Simon, 1900 – Hawaii
- Mecaphesa sierrensis (Schick, 1965) – USA
- Mecaphesa sjostedti (Berland, 1924) – Chile (Juan Fernandez Is.)
- Mecaphesa spiralis (F. O. Pickard-Cambridge, 1900) – Guatemala
- Mecaphesa velata (Simon, 1900) – Hawaii
- Mecaphesa verityi (Schick, 1965) – USA

== See also ==
- List of Thomisidae species
