= Mecaphesa importuna =

Scientific classification
- Domain: Eukaryota
- Kingdom: Animalia
- Phylum: Arthropoda
- Subphylum: Chelicerata
- Class: Arachnida
- Order: Araneae
- Infraorder: Araneomorphae
- Family: Thomisidae
- Genus: Mecaphesa
- Species: M. importuna

Binomial name
- Mecaphesa importuna (Keyserling, 1881)

Species of spider

Mecaphesa importuna is a species of crab spider in the family Thomisidae. It is found in the United States.

== Subspecies ==
These two subspecies belong to the species Mecaphesa importuna:

- (Mecaphesa importuna importuna) (Keyserling, 1881)
- Mecaphesa importuna belkini (Schick, 1965)
