= The Voice (American TV series) season 30 =

The Voice
- Season 30
- Promotional poster featuring coaches Levine, Latifah, Green, and Clarkson
- Hosted by: Carson Daly
- Coaches: Kelly Clarkson; Riley Green; Queen Latifah; Adam Levine
- No. of contestants: 48
- No. of episodes: 13

Release
- Original network: NBC
- Original release: September 21, 2026 – present

Season chronology
- ← Previous; Battle of Champions Next → Celebrity

The thirtieth season of the American reality television series The Voice premiered on September 21, 2026, on NBC. The season is hosted by Carson Daly, who returned for his thirtieth consecutive season as host before departing in the next season. The coaching panel consists of Adam Levine, who returns for his nineteenth season; Kelly Clarkson, who returns for her eleventh season; and debuting coaches Riley Green and Queen Latifah.

The knockout rounds were removed this season being replaced by the new "Cut Week" round, where the coaches send two artists directly to the live shows, and the remaining artists will compete for the last spot.

== Overview ==
=== Coaches and host ===
Coaches and Host of The Voice Season 30

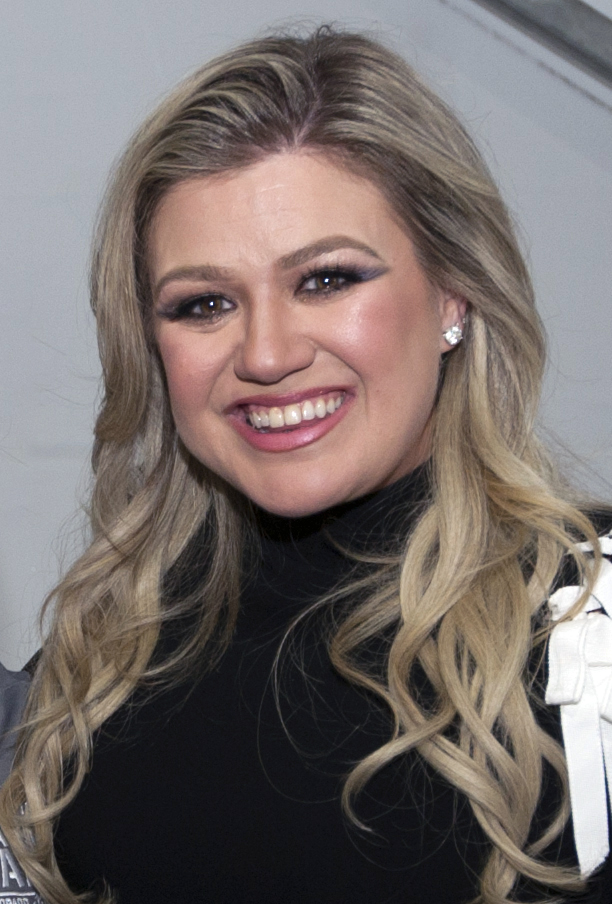
Kelly Clarkson

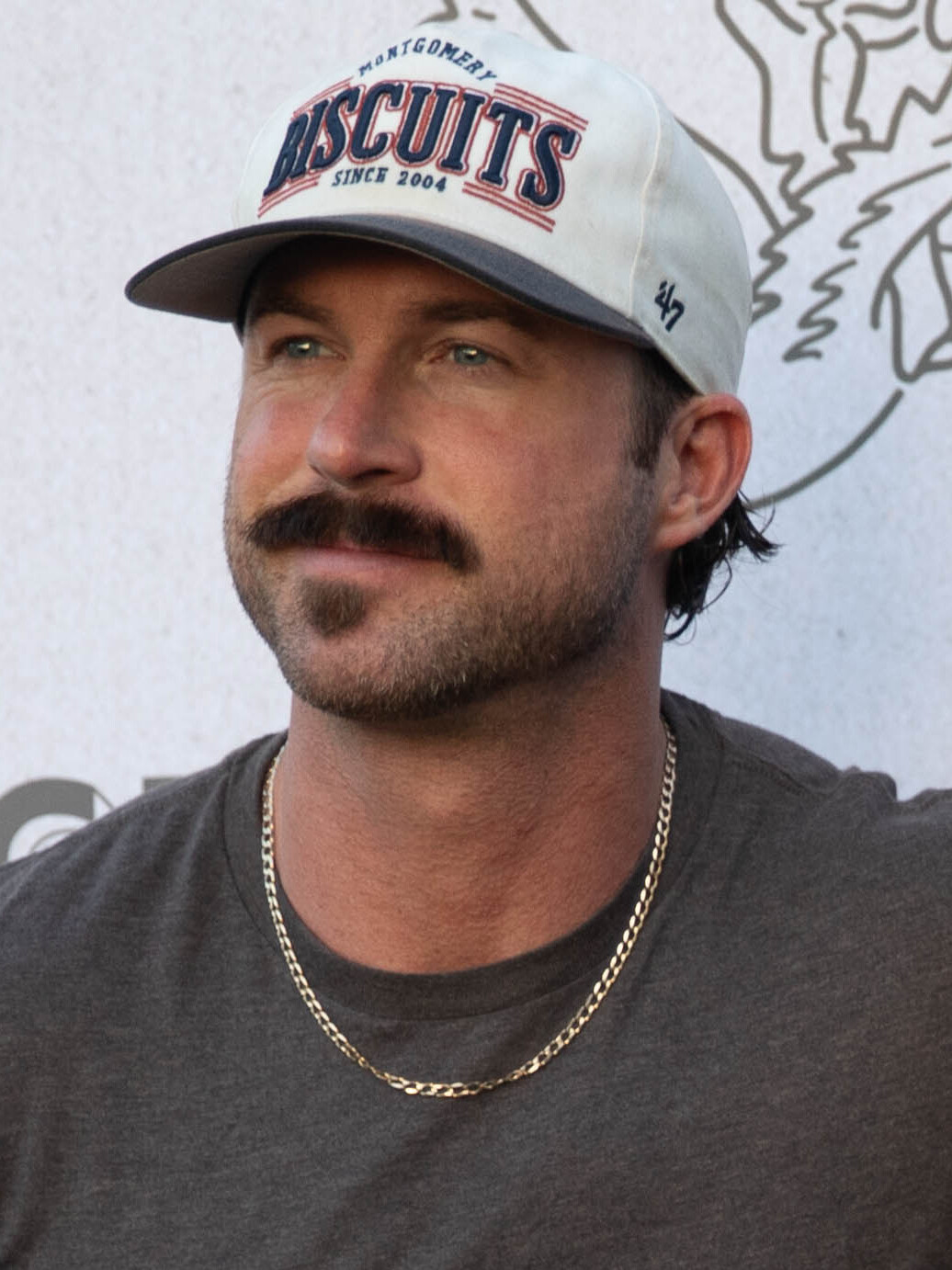
Riley Green

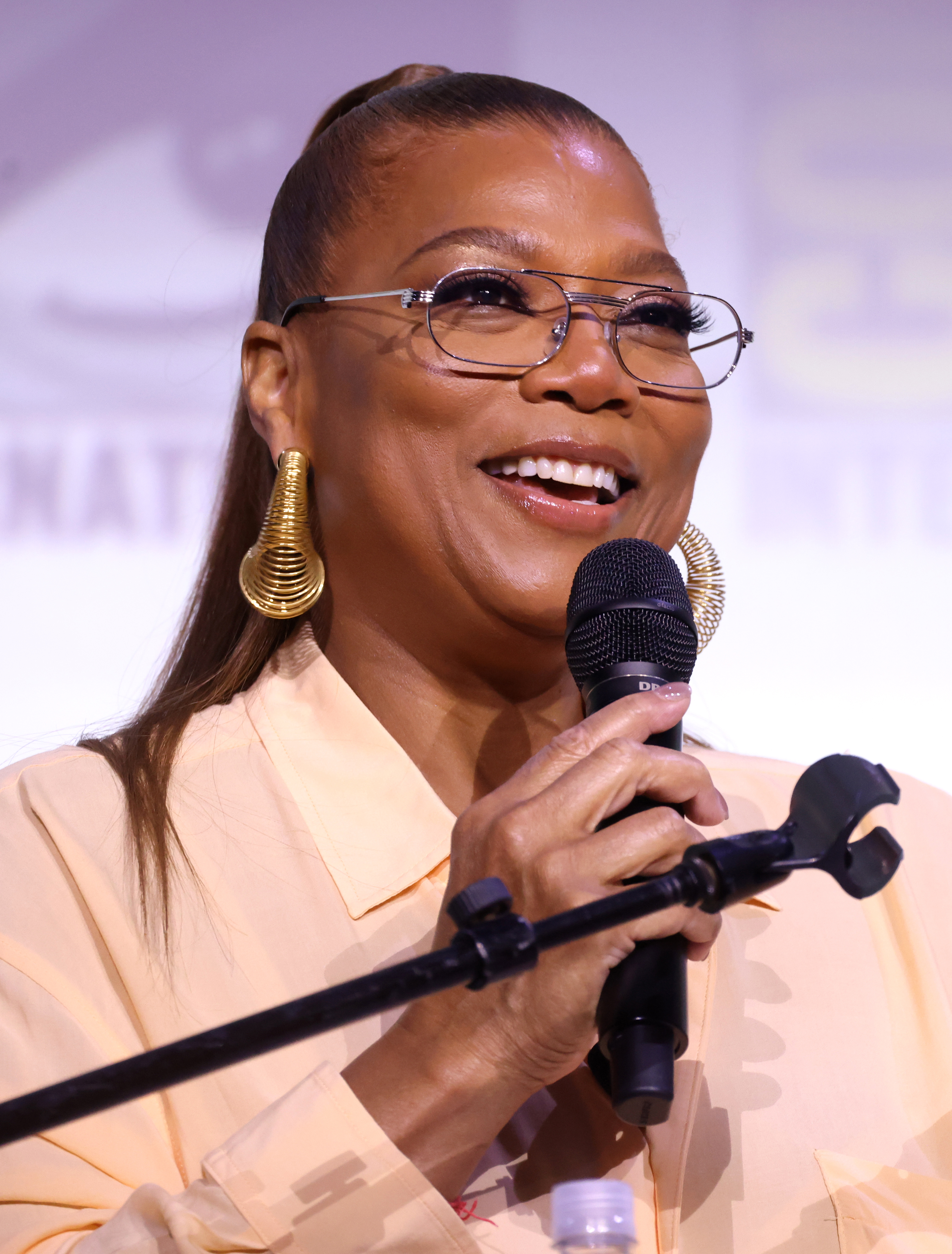
Queen Latifah

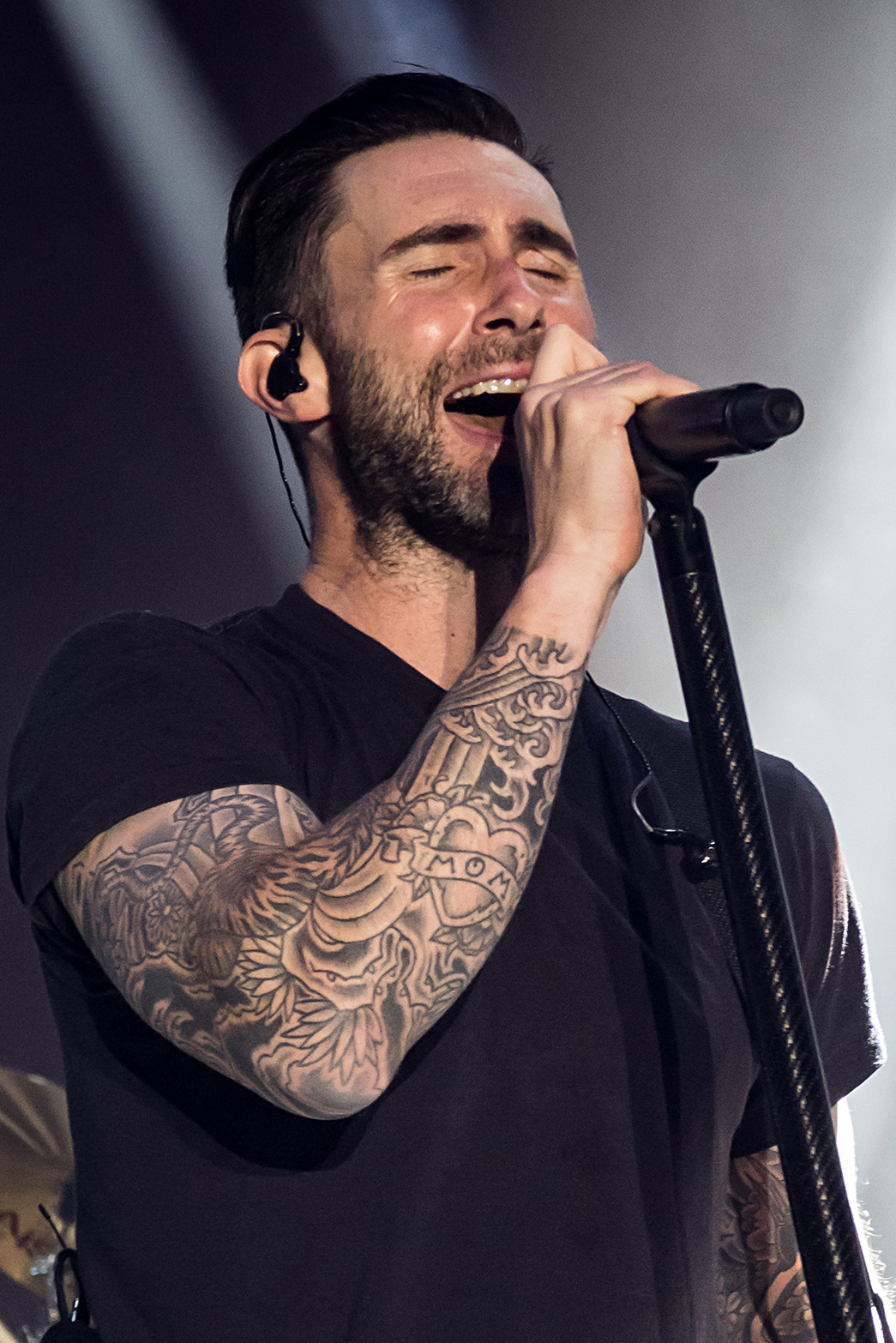
Adam Levine

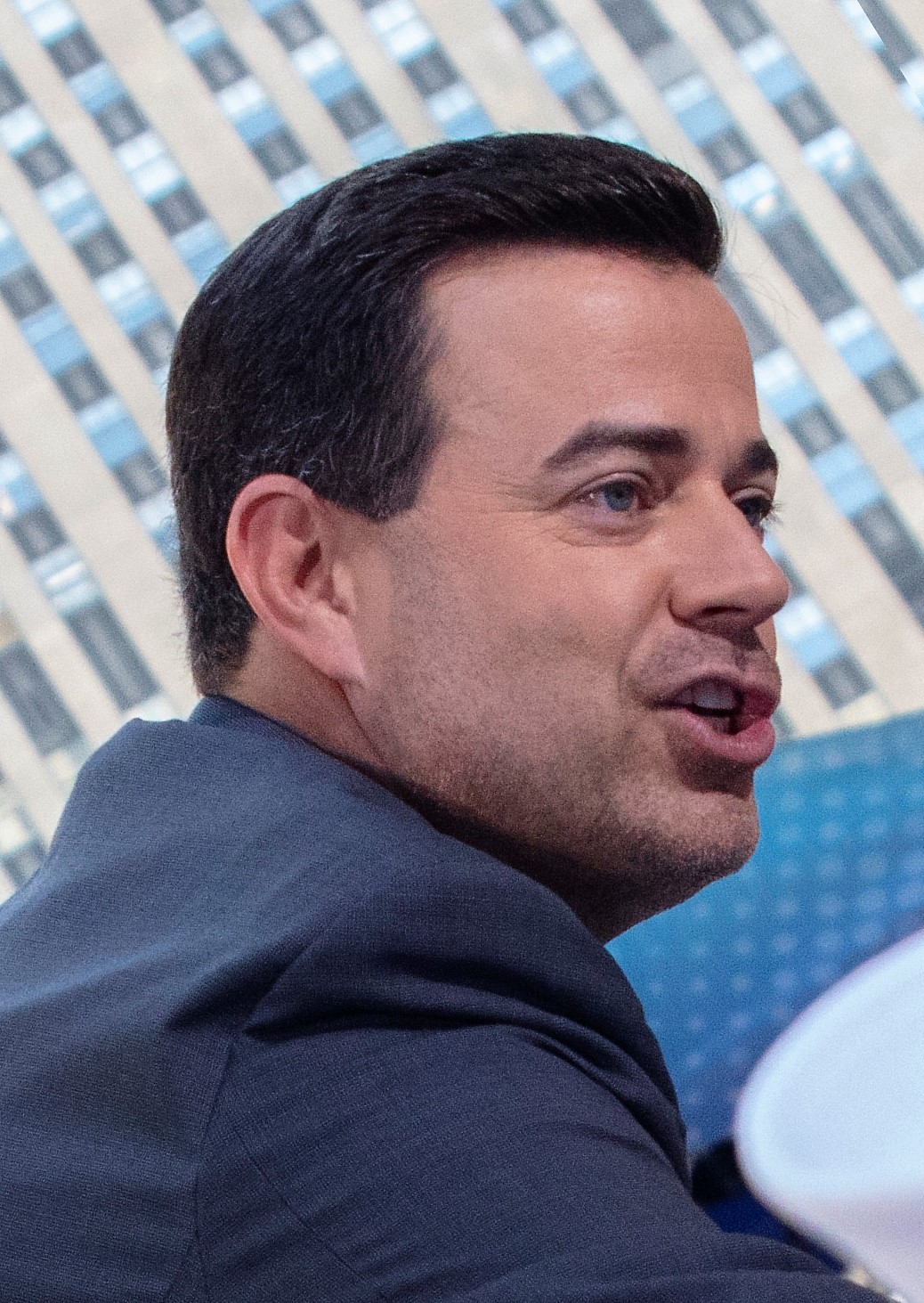
Carson Daly (host)

Of the coaches from the previous season, Adam Levine and Kelly Clarkson both returned, marking their nineteenth and eleventh seasons as coaches, respectively. Coach John Legend left the panel for this season. Levine's return was announced immediately after the season 29 finale on April 14, 2026, and Clarkson's return was announced on May 7, 2026. Days later, the show announced that country singer Riley Green and rapper-songwriter Queen Latifah would debut on the show as new coaches, joining Levine and Clarkson. This season marks the first time since the twenty-sixth season that two coaches debuted on the panel.

Carson Daly returns for his thirtieth consecutive season as host, before Keke Palmer replaces him for the next season.

=== Battle advisors ===
The battle advisors for this season are Ariana DeBose for Team Kelly, Carly Pearce for Team Riley, Patti LaBelle for Team Queen, and Alex Warren for Team Adam.

=== Marketing and promotion ===
On September 9, 2026, the official trailer for the show was released online. On September 17, 2026, the show released the coaches' cover of The Band's 1968 single "The Weight" via its online platforms. The following day (September 18, 2026), the blind audition of Hazel Gerson performing Alex Clare's "Too Close" was released online.

Shortly prior to the premiere on September 21, 2026, BigCountry's blind audition performing Screamin' Jay Hawkins' "I Put a Spell On You" was released online. Later episodes saw the auditions of Cade Mower, Chari A. Williams, Nina Howland, and Kayleigh Mathews released online as a sneak peek for their respective episodes.

=== Additions and changes ===
The new "First-In" button was added in the blind auditions, where, if turned first, a coach can use it to secure an artist for their team. In celebration of the thirtieth season, in the finale the artist with the most amount of TikTok likes and shares will be named the TikTok artist of the season.

== Teams ==
Teams color key
Winner	Eliminated in the Live shows
Runner-up	Eliminated in Cut Week
Third place	Stolen in the Battles
Fourth place	Eliminated in the Battles

Coaches' teams
Coach	Top 48 Artists				
Kelly Clarkson					
Kelly Clarkson	Brianna Cameron	Kyle Davis	Koumba Diallo	Anna McElroy	Nina Howland
Kelly Clarkson	Marcus Ladden Jr.	Brooklyn Marie	Matthew Chiu	Hazel Gerson	Johnnie Kapua
Kelly Clarkson	Kavi Nyx	Saade	Lance Tenazas		
Riley Green					
Riley Green	Ferryn & Brinkley	Joe Henley	Cade Mower	Everett Bounds	Kayleigh Mathews
Riley Green	Keiyana Osmond	Allie Rae	Caroline Alexis	Brendan Coulter	Kenna Elpers
Riley Green	Brayden Howell	Harmony McKee	Brandy Neelly		
Queen Latifah					
Queen Latifah	BigCountry	Mia Knight	Lillie Kolich	Alt Bloom	Chari
Queen Latifah	Bryan Jaymes	Destinee Monroe	~~Brandon Diaz~~	~~Marcus Ladden Jr.~~	~~Kayleigh Mathews~~
Queen Latifah	Luke Cope	Morgan Lett	Sophia Liano		
Adam Levine					
Adam Levine	Connor Closs	Dakota Cohen	Lexi Stephens	Brandon Diaz	Evan James
Adam Levine	Amanda Mikkel	Owen Uffens	~~Destinee Monroe~~	Julia Clark	Cal Cook
Adam Levine	Luke Curran	Marilyn Hucek	Wade Turner		
Note: Italicized names are artists stolen from another team during the battles (names struck through within former teams). The Bold name is the TikTok artist of the season.

== Blind auditions ==
The show began with the Blind Auditions on September 21, 2026. In each audition, an artist sings their piece in front of the coaches, whose chairs face the audience. If a coach is interested in working with the artist, they may press their button to face the artist. If only one coach presses the button, the artist automatically becomes part of their team. If multiple coaches turn, they compete for the artist, who will decide which team they want to join. This season, each coach ends up with 12 artists by the end of the blind auditions, creating a total of 48 artists advancing to the battles.

This season, a new feature was introduced, dubbed the "First-In Button." This addition allows each coach to claim an artist for their team if they were the first one to press their button. Each coach is allowed to utilize the feature once in the span of the round.

This is the sixth in The Voice history where at least one coach (Queen Latifah in this instance) had no one-chair turns on their teams. The others were Adam Levine and Pharrell Williams in season 7, John Legend in season 17, Clarkson in season 23, Legend and Niall Horan in season 24, and Horan in season 28.

Blind auditions color key
✔	Coach hit their "I WANT YOU" button
	Artist defaulted to this coach's team
	Artist selected to join this coach's team
	Coach hit their "First-In" button and artist defaulted to their team
	Artist was eliminated with no coach pressing their button

=== Episode 1 (September 21) ===
Among this episode's auditionees were Ferryn & Brinkley Wright, who both previously competed on the twenty-third season of American Idol.

First blind auditions results
Order	Artist	Age(s)	Hometown	Song	Coach's and artist's choices			
Order	Artist	Age(s)	Hometown	Song	Kelly	Riley	Queen	Adam
1	BigCountry	37	Tacoma, Washington	"I Put a Spell on You"	–	✔	✔	✔
2	Joe Henley	19	Grand Bay, Alabama	"Anymore"	✔	✔	–	–
3	Hazel Gerson	21	San Jose, California	"Too Close"	✔	✔	–	–
4	Marcus Ladden Jr.	19	Atlanta, Georgia	"Cry Me a River"	✔	–	✔	–
5	Destinee Monroe	32	Atlantic City, New Jersey	"Home Sweet Home"	–	✔	✔	✔
6	Ferryn & Brinkley (Ferryn and Brinkley Wright)	20 & 17	Sevierville, Tennessee	"When Will I Be Loved"	✔	✔	✔	✔
7	Forté (Marquis Forte Harris)	31	Emporia, Virginia	"Before I Let Go"	–	–	–	–
8	Caroline Alexis	25	Ozark, Alabama	"Take Me There"	–	✔	–	–
9	Mia Knight	16	Holmdel, New Jersey	"You Stole the Show"	✔	✔	✔	–
10	Owen Uffens	18	Rigby, Idaho	"Everybody's Talkin'"	✔	–	–	✔
11	Brianna Cameron	13	Union, New Jersey	"River Deep – Mountain High"	✔	✔	–	–

=== Episode 2 (September 22) ===
Among this episode's auditionees was Alt Bloom, who previously competed under his real name, Ethan Thompson, on the thirteenth season of American Idol.

Second blind auditions results
Order	Artist	Age	Hometown	Song	Coach's and artist's choices			
Order	Artist	Age	Hometown	Song	Kelly	Riley	Queen	Adam
1	Koumba Diallo	15	Delano, California	"Stone Cold"	✔	✔	✔	✔
2	Alt Bloom (Ethan Thompson)	36	Whitefish, Montana	"The Bones"	–	✔	✔	–
3	Johnnie Kapua	32	Herriman, Utah / Wellington, New Zealand	"Die with a Smile"	✔	–	✔	–
4	Harmony McKee	19	Medina, Tennessee	"Gunpowder & Lead"	–	✔	–	✔
5	Ethan Shobert	19	Charlotte, North Carolina	"The Great Divide"	–	–	–	–
6	Jenie	32	Far Rockaway, New York	"So Easy (To Fall in Love)"	–	–	–	–
7	Saniah Jewel	20	Englewood, New Jersey	"Pink Pony Club"	–	–	–	–
8	Lexi Stephens	23	Albany, New York	"Die on This Hill"	✔	✔	✔	✔

=== Episode 3 (September 23) ===
Third blind auditions results
Order	Artist	Age	Hometown	Song	Coach's and artist's choices			
Order	Artist	Age	Hometown	Song	Kelly	Riley	Queen	Adam
1	Kyle Davis	61	Prince George, Virginia	"In Your Eyes"	✔	✔	✔	✔
2	Kenna Elpers	23	Cynthiana, Indiana	"White Horse"	–	✔	✔	–
3	Morgan Lett	27	Akron, Ohio	"I'm Goin' Down"	–	✔	✔	–
4	Brooklyn Marie	14	Alexandria, Minnesota	"Traitor"	✔	–	✔	–
5	Conor Pederson	26	Pittsburgh, Pennsylvania	"Mercy"	–	–	–	–
6	Amanda Mikkel	31	Dayton, Ohio	"Moon River"	✔	✔	✔	✔

=== Episode 4 (September 28) ===
Among this episode's auditionees was Anna McElroy, who previously competed on the twenty-third season of American Idol.

Fourth blind auditions results
Order	Artist	Age	Hometown	Song	Coach's and artist's choices			
Order	Artist	Age	Hometown	Song	Kelly	Riley	Queen	Adam
1	Cade Mower	35	Bluffdale, Utah	"Something in the Orange"	✔	✔	✔	✔
2	Bryan Jaymes	39	Baton Rouge, Louisiana	"Everytime You Go Away"	–	✔	✔	✔
3	Allie Rae	15	Santa Fe, Texas	"Black Velvet"	✔	✔	✔	–
4	Connor Closs	23	Middletown, New Jersey	"Too Sweet"	–	✔	–	✔
5	Serrin Joy	24	Akron, Ohio	"Be Without You"	–	–	–	–
6	Saade (Saba Balchi)	24	San Francisco, California / Tehran, Iran	"Oscar Winning Tears"	✔	✔	✔	–
7	Everett Bounds	23	Hesperia, California	"Drivin' My Life Away"	–	✔	–	–
8	Sophia Liano	18	Stuart, Florida	"I Surrender"	–	✔	✔	–
9	Anna McElroy	26	Mobile, Alabama	"80s Mercedes"	✔	✔	✔	–
10	Julia Clark	24	Hilton Head Island, South Carolina	"Bellyache"	–	–	✔	✔
11	Cal Cook	28	Salt Lake City, Utah	"The Dress"	–	–	–	✔
12	Brett Tomberlin	29	Locust, North Carolina	"Your Man"	–	–	–	–
13	Chari (Chari A. Williams)	31	Atlanta, Georgia	"Get Here"	✔	✔	✔	✔

=== Episode 5 (October 5) ===
Among this episode's auditionees was Brandon Diaz, the husband of season 14 semifinalist Jackie Foster, who previously auditioned unsuccessfully in season 4, and later competed on the sixteenth season of American Idol; and Brandy Neelly, who previously competed on the thirteenth season of American Idol.

Fifth blind auditions results
Order	Artist	Age	Hometown	Song	Coach's and artist's choices			
Order	Artist	Age	Hometown	Song	Kelly	Riley	Queen	Adam
1	Brandon Diaz	29	Ashburn, Virginia	"Drink You Away"	✔	–	✔	–
2	Marilyn Hucek	34	Washington, D.C.	"La Tortura"	–	–	✔	✔
3	Keiyana Osmond	32	Salt Lake City, Utah	"Kiss Me"	–	✔	–	–
4	Dakota Cohen	25	Los Angeles, California	"Changes"	–	✔	–	✔
5	Luke Cope	33	Kernersville, North Carolina	"Burning House"	–	–	✔	✔
6	Nina Howland	24	New York City, New York	"Love Me Like a Man"	✔	✔	✔	✔
7	Luke Curran	31	Sarasota, Florida	"Operator (That's Not the Way It Feels)"	–	✔	–	✔
8	Matthew Chiu	25	Brooklyn, New York	"Home"	✔	–	–	–
9	Raymn	26	Los Angeles, California	"Yukon"	–	–	–	–
10	Brandy Neelly	31	Louisville, Kentucky	"A Lesson in Leavin'"	–	✔	✔	–
11	Phinley McKee	16	Lancaster, Ohio	"Way Down We Go"	–	–	–	–
12	Kayleigh Mathews	31	Tucson, Arizona	"When I Call Your Name"	✔	✔	✔	✔

=== Episode 6 (October 6) ===
The sixth episode included the last auditions as well as the first battle.

Sixth blind auditions results
Order	Artist	Age	Hometown	Song	Coach's and artist's choices			
Order	Artist	Age	Hometown	Song	Kelly	Riley	Queen	Adam
1	Lillie Kolich	25	Albuquerque, New Mexico	"Back to Friends"	✔	✔	✔	✔
2	Brendan Coulter	27	Toledo, Ohio	"Liar"	✔	✔	Team full	–
3	Zalissa	26	Memphis, Tennessee	"Sweet Thing"	–	–	Team full	–
4	Kavi Nyx (Sanjana Santosh)	17	Atlanta, Georgia	"Wildflower"	✔	✔	Team full	✔
5	Isabella Juliet	17	Gilbert, Arizona	"Things a Man Oughta Know"	–	–	Team full	–
6	Evan James	22	Highland, Michigan	"Wasted on You"	✔	✔	Team full	✔
7	Lance Tenazas	22	Mission Viejo, California	"Risk It All"	✔	✔	Team full	–
8	Bela Pierce	29	Lakeland, Florida	"Just a Girl"	Team full	–	Team full	–
9	Wade Turner	18	Georgetown, Massachusetts	"This Town"	Team full	✔	Team full	✔
10	Brayden Howell	19	Marshville, North Carolina	"Friends in Low Places"	Team full	✔	Team full	Team full

== Battles ==
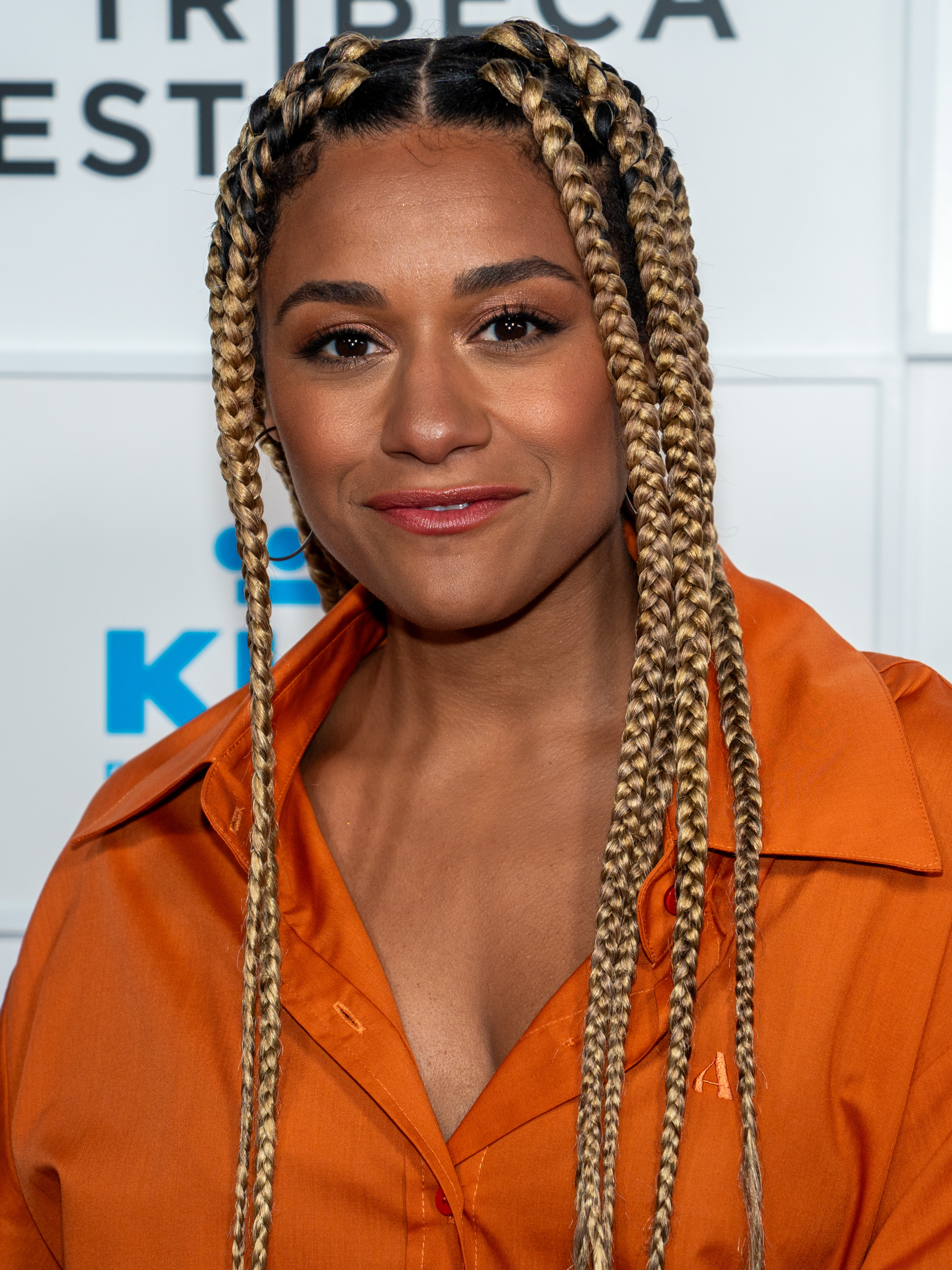
Ariana DeBose served as an advisor for Team Kelly, Carly Pearce for Team Riley, Patti LaBelle for Team Queen, and Alex Warren for Team Adam.

The second stage of the show, the battles, aired from October 6, 2026, immediately after the conclusion of blind auditions, to October 26, 2026, consisting of episodes 6 through 10. The advisors for this round were Ariana DeBose for Team Kelly, Carly Pearce for Team Riley, Patti LaBelle for Team Queen, and Alex Warren for Team Adam.

Losing artists may be "stolen" by another coach, becoming new members of that coach's team. Multiple coaches can attempt to steal an artist, resulting in a competition for the artist, who will then decide which team to join. Each coach has one steal to use this round. At the end of this round, seven artists will remain on each team; six will be the battle winners, while the other is stolen from another coach. In total, 28 artists advanced to Cut Week.

Battles color key
Artist won the Battle and advanced to Cut Week
Artist lost the battle but was stolen by another coach, and advanced to Cut Week
Artist lost the Battle and was eliminated

Battles results
Episode	Coach	Order	Winner	Song	Loser	'Steal' result			
Episode	Coach	Order	Winner	Song	Loser	Kelly	Riley	Queen	Adam
Episode 6 (Tuesday, Oct. 6, 2026)	Riley	1	Ferryn & Brinkley	"Mama's Broken Heart"	Brandy Neelly	–	N/A	–	–
Episode 7 (Monday, Oct. 12, 2026)	Queen	1	Alt Bloom	"Ex-Factor"	Morgan Lett	–	–	N/A	–
Episode 7 (Monday, Oct. 12, 2026)	Adam	2	Connor Closs	"Homewrecker"	Cal Cook	–	–	–	N/A
Episode 7 (Monday, Oct. 12, 2026)	Riley	3	Joe Henley	"Don't Mind If I Do"	Kenna Elpers	–	N/A	–	–
Episode 7 (Monday, Oct. 12, 2026)	Kelly	4	Koumba Diallo	"Birds of a Feather"	Lance Tenazas	N/A	–	–	–
Episode 7 (Monday, Oct. 12, 2026)	Riley	5	Everett Bounds	"Louisiana Woman, Mississippi Man"	Caroline Alexis	–	N/A	–	–
Episode 7 (Monday, Oct. 12, 2026)	Queen	6	Lillie Kolich	"Girl Crush"	Kayleigh Mathews	✔	✔	N/A	–
Episode 8 (Tuesday, Oct. 13, 2026)	Queen	1	BigCountry	"Tennessee Whiskey"	Luke Cope	–	Team full	N/A	–
Episode 8 (Tuesday, Oct. 13, 2026)	Kelly	2	Anna McElroy	"Some Things I'll Never Know"	Johnnie Kapua	N/A	Team full	–	–
Episode 8 (Tuesday, Oct. 13, 2026)	Riley	3	Keiyana Osmond	"She Will Be Loved"	Brendan Coulter	–	Team full	–	–
Episode 8 (Tuesday, Oct. 13, 2026)	Adam	4	Evan James	"Wind Up Missin' You"	Luke Curran	–	Team full	–	N/A
Episode 8 (Tuesday, Oct. 13, 2026)	Kelly	5	Nina Howland	"Breathe Me"	Hazel Gerson	N/A	Team full	–	–
Episode 8 (Tuesday, Oct. 13, 2026)	Queen	6	Chari	"On My Own"	Marcus Ladden Jr.	✔	Team full	N/A	–
Episode 9 (Monday, Oct. 19, 2026)	Queen	1	Bryan Jaymes	"As"	Brandon Diaz	Team full	Team full	N/A	✔
Episode 9 (Monday, Oct. 19, 2026)	Riley	2	Allie Rae	"Ain't No Sunshine"	Harmony McKee	Team full	Team full	–	Team full
Episode 9 (Monday, Oct. 19, 2026)	Adam	3	Owen Uffens	"Dive"	Wade Turner	Team full	Team full	–	Team full
Episode 9 (Monday, Oct. 19, 2026)	Kelly	4	Kyle Davis	"Take Me Home"	Matthew Chiu	Team full	Team full	–	Team full
Episode 9 (Monday, Oct. 19, 2026)	Adam	5	Amanda Mikkel	"Can't Help Falling in Love"	Julia Clark	Team full	Team full	–	Team full
Episode 9 (Monday, Oct. 19, 2026)	Kelly	6	Brianna Cameron	"Mercy"	Saade	Team full	Team full	–	Team full
Episode 10 (Monday, Oct. 26, 2026)	Queen	1	Mia Knight	"Never Enough"	Sophia Liano	Team full	Team full	N/A	Team full
Episode 10 (Monday, Oct. 26, 2026)	Riley	2	Cade Mower	"Wondering Why"	Brayden Howell	Team full	Team full	–	Team full
Episode 10 (Monday, Oct. 26, 2026)	Adam	3	Lexi Stephens	"All I Wanted"	Marilyn Hucek	Team full	Team full	–	Team full
Episode 10 (Monday, Oct. 26, 2026)	Kelly	4	Brooklyn Marie	"Titanium"	Kavi Nyx	Team full	Team full	–	Team full
Episode 10 (Monday, Oct. 26, 2026)	Adam	5	Dakota Cohen	"Bring Me to Life"	Destinee Monroe	Team full	Team full	✔	Team full

== Cut Week ==
Cut Week performances aired on November 2, 2026, consisting of episode 11. Each coach sent two artists directly to the live shows, and the remaining artists competed for the last spot on each team. The public's vote for one additional artist, from any team, completed the live shows lineup. In total, 13 artists advanced to the Live Shows.

Cut Week color key
Artist was chosen by their coach to move on to the Live Shows
Artist was originally eliminated, but was saved by the public's vote and moved on to the Live Shows
Artist was eliminated and was not saved by the public's vote

Artists immediately advanced
Episode	Coach	Artists	
Episode 11 (Monday, November 2, 2026)	Queen Latifah	BigCountry	Mia Knight
Episode 11 (Monday, November 2, 2026)	Adam Levine	Lexi Stephens	Connor Closs
Episode 11 (Monday, November 2, 2026)	Riley Green	Cade Mower	Ferryn & Brinkley
Episode 11 (Monday, November 2, 2026)	Kelly Clarkson	Koumba Diallo	Anna McElroy

Cut Week results
Episode	Coach	Order	Artist	Song	Result
Episode 11 (Monday, November 2, 2026)	Queen Latifah	1	Bryan Jaymes	"Use Me"	Eliminated
Episode 11 (Monday, November 2, 2026)	Queen Latifah	2	Destinee Monroe	"Space Oddity"	Eliminated
Episode 11 (Monday, November 2, 2026)	Queen Latifah	3	Alt Bloom	"For the First Time"	Eliminated
Episode 11 (Monday, November 2, 2026)	Queen Latifah	4	Lillie Kolich	"Friday I'm in Love"	Queen's choice
Episode 11 (Monday, November 2, 2026)	Queen Latifah	5	Chari	"Killing Me Softly with His Song"	Eliminated
Episode 11 (Monday, November 2, 2026)	Adam Levine	6	Evan James	"Midnight Train to Memphis"	Eliminated
Episode 11 (Monday, November 2, 2026)	Adam Levine	7	Dakota Cohen	"Hemorrhage (In My Hands)"	Adam's choice
Episode 11 (Monday, November 2, 2026)	Adam Levine	8	Owen Uffens	"Electric Feel"	Eliminated
Episode 11 (Monday, November 2, 2026)	Adam Levine	9	Amanda Mikkel	"A Thousand Miles"	Eliminated
Episode 11 (Monday, November 2, 2026)	Adam Levine	10	Brandon Diaz	"Dare You to Move"	Eliminated
Episode 11 (Monday, November 2, 2026)	Riley Green	11	Allie Rae	"4x4xU"	Eliminated
Episode 11 (Monday, November 2, 2026)	Riley Green	12	Everett Bounds	"Killin' Time"	Eliminated
Episode 11 (Monday, November 2, 2026)	Riley Green	13	Keiyana Osmond	"Will You Love Me Tomorrow"	Eliminated
Episode 11 (Monday, November 2, 2026)	Riley Green	14	Kayleigh Mathews	"Walkin' After Midnight"	Eliminated
Episode 11 (Monday, November 2, 2026)	Riley Green	15	Joe Henley	"Don't Close Your Eyes"	Riley's choice
Episode 11 (Monday, November 2, 2026)	Kelly Clarkson	16	Marcus Ladden Jr.	"You'll Never Find Another Love Like Mine"	Eliminated
Episode 11 (Monday, November 2, 2026)	Kelly Clarkson	17	Brooklyn Marie	"Goodbye Yellow Brick Road"	Eliminated
Episode 11 (Monday, November 2, 2026)	Kelly Clarkson	18	Brianna Cameron	"Inseparable"	Kelly's choice
Episode 11 (Monday, November 2, 2026)	Kelly Clarkson	19	Nina Howland	"In the Kitchen"	Eliminated
Episode 11 (Monday, November 2, 2026)	Kelly Clarkson	20	Kyle Davis	"Can't Find My Way Home"	Saved

== Live shows ==
=== Weeks 1–2: Top 13 – Y2K Night (Nov. 9–16) ===
The Top 13 performances aired on November 9 and 16, 2026, consisting of episodes 12 and 13. The Top 13 artists, three from each team and one selected by the public, performed on Monday for the first group, with another round of performances on the following Monday. Each artist will perform one Y2K pop song. Due to the results taking place at the end of the same episode as the performances, the Live Shows are simulcast on NBC and Peacock in all time zones.

Teams Adam and Queen performed the first week and Teams Kelly and Riley performed the second week.

Live shows color key
Artist was saved by public's vote
Artist was eliminated

Top 13 results
Episode	Coach	Order	Artist	Song	Result
Episode 12 (Monday, Nov. 9, 2026)	Queen Latifah	1	Mia Knight	"Miss Independent"	Public's vote
Episode 12 (Monday, Nov. 9, 2026)	Adam Levine	2	Dakota Cohen	"I Don't Want to Miss a Thing"	Public's vote
Episode 12 (Monday, Nov. 9, 2026)	Queen Latifah	3	Lillie Kolich	"(You Drive Me) Crazy"	Eliminated
Episode 12 (Monday, Nov. 9, 2026)	Adam Levine	4	Connor Closs	"This I Promise You"	Public's vote
Episode 12 (Monday, Nov. 9, 2026)	Queen Latifah	5	BigCountry	"It's My Life"	Public's vote
Episode 12 (Monday, Nov. 9, 2026)	Adam Levine	6	Lexi Stephens	"I'm with You"	Public's vote
Episode 13 (Monday, Nov. 16, 2026)	Kelly Clarkson	1	Koumba Diallo	"Fallin'"	Public's vote
Episode 13 (Monday, Nov. 16, 2026)	Riley Green	2	Ferryn & Brinkley	"Cowboy Take Me Away"	Public's vote
Episode 13 (Monday, Nov. 16, 2026)	Kelly Clarkson	3	Kyle Davis	"Somewhere Only We Know"	Public's vote
Episode 13 (Monday, Nov. 16, 2026)	Kelly Clarkson	4	Anna McElroy	"Breathe"	Eliminated
Episode 13 (Monday, Nov. 16, 2026)	Riley Green	5	Cade Mower	"Iris"	Eliminated
Episode 13 (Monday, Nov. 16, 2026)	Kelly Clarkson	6	Brianna Cameron	"Reflection"	Public's vote
Episode 13 (Monday, Nov. 16, 2026)	Riley Green	7	Joe Henley	"I Hope You Dance"	Public's vote

Non-competition performances
Order	Performers	Song
12.1	Top 13 Artists	"Everybody (Backstreet's Back)"

=== Week 3: Top 10 – Dolly Parton Night (Nov. 23) ===
The Top 10 performances and results will air on November 23, 2026, consisting of episode 14. Each artist will perform one song by Dolly Parton.

Live shows color key
Artist was saved by public's vote
Artist was eliminated

Top 10 results
Episode	Coach	Order	Artist	Song	Result
Episode 14 (Monday, Nov. 23, 2026)	Queen Latifah	TBA	BigCountry	TBA	TBA
Episode 14 (Monday, Nov. 23, 2026)	Kelly Clarkson	TBA	Brianna Cameron	TBA	TBA
Episode 14 (Monday, Nov. 23, 2026)	Adam Levine	TBA	Connor Closs	TBA	TBA
Episode 14 (Monday, Nov. 23, 2026)	Adam Levine	TBA	Dakota Cohen	TBA	TBA
Episode 14 (Monday, Nov. 23, 2026)	Kelly Clarkson	TBA	Kyle Davis	TBA	TBA
Episode 14 (Monday, Nov. 23, 2026)	Kelly Clarkson	TBA	Koumba Diallo	TBA	TBA
Episode 14 (Monday, Nov. 23, 2026)	Riley Green	TBA	Ferryn & Brinkley	TBA	TBA
Episode 14 (Monday, Nov. 23, 2026)	Riley Green	TBA	Joe Henley	TBA	TBA
Episode 14 (Monday, Nov. 23, 2026)	Queen Latifah	TBA	Mia Knight	TBA	TBA
Episode 14 (Monday, Nov. 23, 2026)	Adam Levine	TBA	Lexi Stephens	TBA	TBA

== Elimination chart ==
Results color key
Winner	Saved by the public
Runner-up	Eliminated
Third place
Fourth place

Coaches color key
Team Kelly
Team Riley
Team Queen
Team Adam

=== Overall ===
Live shows' results per week
Artists	Top 13	Top 10	Top 8	Semifinals	Final
BigCountry	Safe				
Brianna Cameron	Safe				
Connor Closs	Safe				
Dakota Cohen	Safe				
Kyle Davis	Safe				
Koumba Diallo	Safe				
Ferryn & Brinkley	Safe				
Joe Henley	Safe				
Mia Knight	Safe				
Lexi Stephens	Safe				
Anna McElroy	Eliminated	Eliminated (Week 2)			
Cade Mower	Eliminated	Eliminated (Week 2)			
Lillie Kolich	Eliminated	Eliminated (Week 1)			

=== Per team ===
Live shows' results per team
Artists	Top 13	Top 10	Top 8	Semifinals	Final
Brianna Cameron	Advanced				
Kyle Davis	Advanced				
Koumba Diallo	Advanced				
Anna McElroy	Eliminated				
Ferryn & Brinkley	Advanced				
Joe Henley	Advanced				
Cade Mower	Eliminated				
BigCountry	Advanced				
Mia Knight	Advanced				
Lillie Kolich	Eliminated				
Connor Closs	Advanced				
Dakota Cohen	Advanced				
Lexi Stephens	Advanced				

== Ratings ==
Viewership and ratings per episode of The Voice season 30
No.	Title	Air date	Timeslot (ET)	Rating (18–49)	Viewers (millions)	DVR (18–49)	DVR viewers (millions)	Total (18–49)	Total viewers (millions)	Ref.
Special	"The Voice 30th Season Celebration"	September 17, 2026	Thursday 10:00 p.m.	0.15	1.73	TBD	TBD	TBD	TBD	
1	"The Blind Auditions, Season Premiere"	September 21, 2026	Monday 8:00 p.m.	0.40	5.33	TBD	TBD	TBD	TBD	
2	"The Blind Auditions, Part 2"	September 22, 2026	Tuesday 8:00 p.m.	0.41	4.69	TBD	TBD	TBD	TBD	
3	"The Blind Auditions, Part 3"	September 23, 2026	Wednesday 8:00 p.m.	0.36	4.67	TBD	TBD	TBD	TBD	
4	"The Blind Auditions, Part 4"	September 28, 2026	Monday 8:00 p.m.	0.41	5.16	TBD	TBD	TBD	TBD	
5	"The Blind Auditions, Part 5"	October 5, 2026	Monday 8:00 p.m.	0.44	5.07	TBD	TBD	TBD	TBD	
6	"The Blind Auditions, Part 6"	October 6, 2026	Tuesday 8:00 p.m.	0.29	TBD	TBD	TBD	TBD	TBD	
7	"The Battles Premiere"	October 12, 2026	Monday 8:00 p.m.	0.33	4.13	TBD	TBD	TBD	TBD	
8	"The Battles Part 2"	October 13, 2026	Tuesday 8:00 p.m.	0.26	4.02	TBD	TBD	TBD	TBD	
9	"The Battles Part 3"	October 19, 2026	Monday 8:00 p.m.	TBD	TBD	TBD	TBD	TBD	TBD	
10	"The Battles Part 4"	October 26, 2026	Monday 8:00 p.m.	TBD	TBD	TBD	TBD	TBD	TBD	
11	"Cut Week"	November 2, 2026	Monday 9:00 p.m.	TBD	TBD	TBD	TBD	TBD	TBD	
12	"Live Top 13 Part 1"	November 9, 2026	Monday 9:00 p.m.	TBD	TBD	TBD	TBD	TBD	TBD	
13	"Live Top 13 Part 2"	November 16, 2026	Monday 9:00 p.m.	TBD	TBD	TBD	TBD	TBD	TBD	
14	"Live Top 10"	November 23, 2026	Monday 9:00 p.m.	TBD	TBD	TBD	TBD	TBD	TBD	
15	"Live Top 8"	November 30, 2026	Monday 9:00 p.m.	TBD	TBD	TBD	TBD	TBD	TBD	
16	"Live Top 6"	December 7, 2026	Monday 9:00 p.m.	TBD	TBD	TBD	TBD	TBD	TBD	
