= Mecaphesa quercina =

Scientific classification
- Kingdom: Animalia
- Phylum: Arthropoda
- Subphylum: Chelicerata
- Class: Arachnida
- Order: Araneae
- Infraorder: Araneomorphae
- Family: Thomisidae
- Genus: Mecaphesa
- Species: M. quercina

Binomial name
- Mecaphesa quercina (Schick, 1965)

Species of spider

Mecaphesa quercina, the oak crab spider, is a species of crab spider in the family Thomisidae. It is found in the United States.
