= Mecaphesa coloradensis =

Scientific classification
- Domain: Eukaryota
- Kingdom: Animalia
- Phylum: Arthropoda
- Subphylum: Chelicerata
- Class: Arachnida
- Order: Araneae
- Infraorder: Araneomorphae
- Family: Thomisidae
- Genus: Mecaphesa
- Species: M. coloradensis

Binomial name
- Mecaphesa coloradensis (Gertsch, 1933)

Species of spider

Mecaphesa coloradensis is a species of crab spider in the family Thomisidae. It is found in the United States and Mexico.
