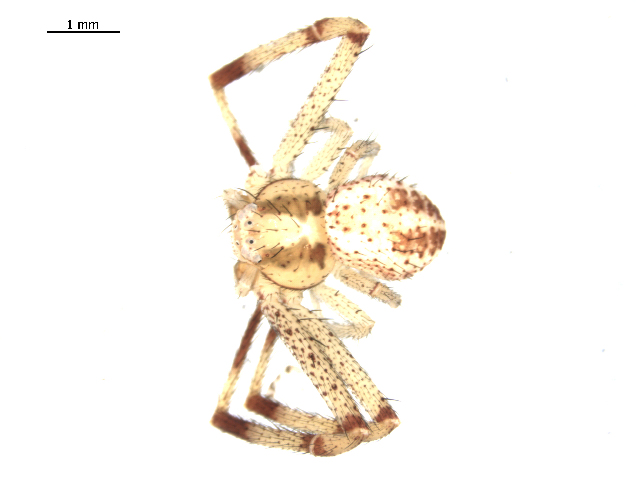

Scientific classification
- Domain: Eukaryota
- Kingdom: Animalia
- Phylum: Arthropoda
- Subphylum: Chelicerata
- Class: Arachnida
- Order: Araneae
- Infraorder: Araneomorphae
- Family: Thomisidae
- Genus: Mecaphesa
- Species: M. carletonica

Binomial name
- Mecaphesa carletonica (Dondale & Redner, 1976)

= Mecaphesa carletonica =

Species of spider

Mecaphesa carletonica is a species of crab spider in the family Thomisidae. It is found in the United States and Canada.
