= The Voice (American TV series) season 31 =

The Voice: Celebrity
- Season 31
- Hosted by: Keke Palmer
- Coaches: Riley Green; Queen Latifah; Joe Jonas

Release
- Original network: NBC

Season chronology
- ← Previous; Season 30

The thirty-first season of the American reality television series The Voice (subtitled as The Voice: Celebrity) will premiere in the first half of 2027, on NBC. This season is the second season to feature only three coaches. The season will be hosted by Keke Palmer, who joins the show for her first season, replacing Carson Daly. The coaching panel will consist of Riley Green and Queen Latifah, who both return for their second seasons; and former The Voice Australia coach Joe Jonas.

== Overview ==
=== Coaches and host ===
Coaches and Host of The Voice: Celebrity

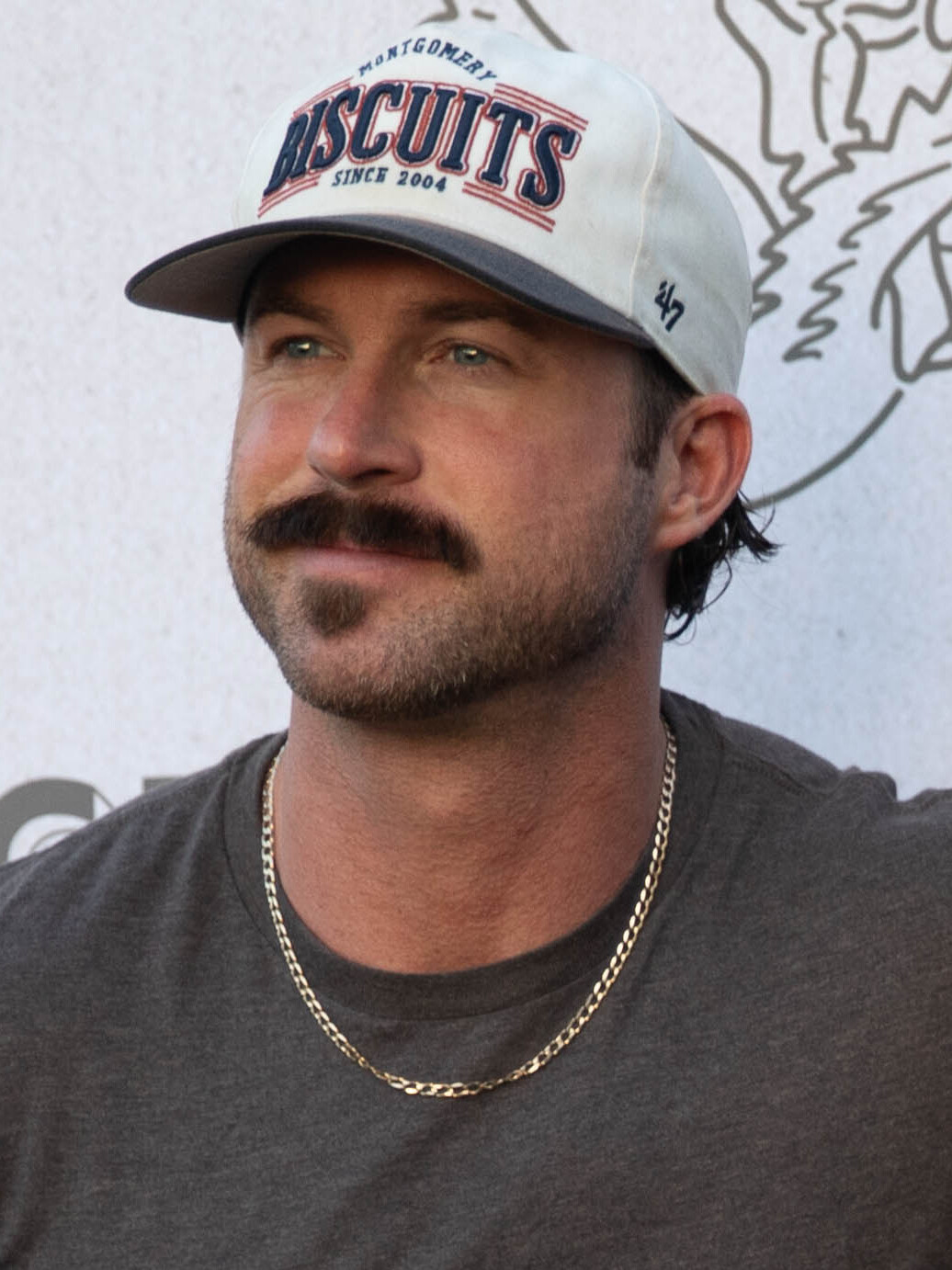
Riley Green

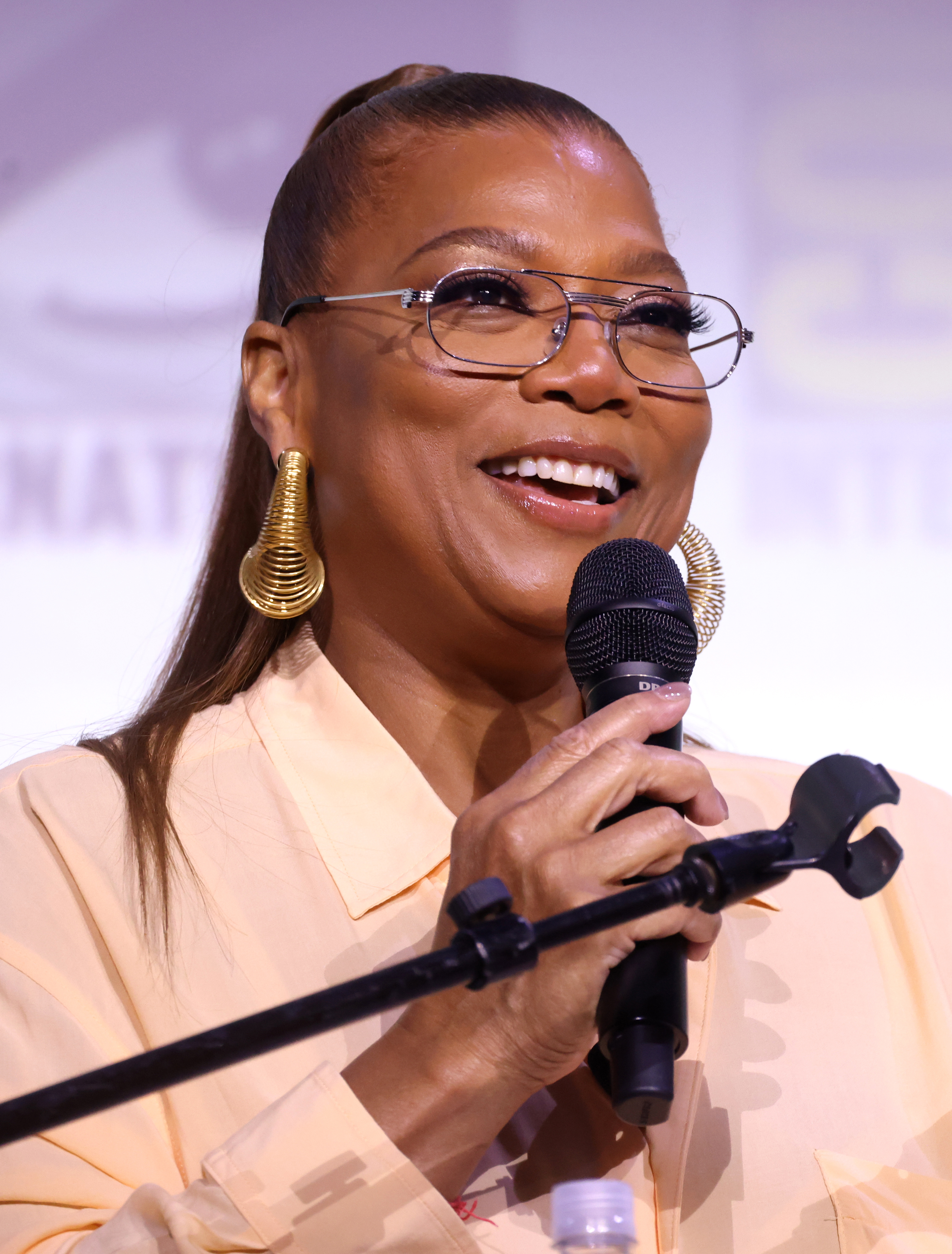
Queen Latifah

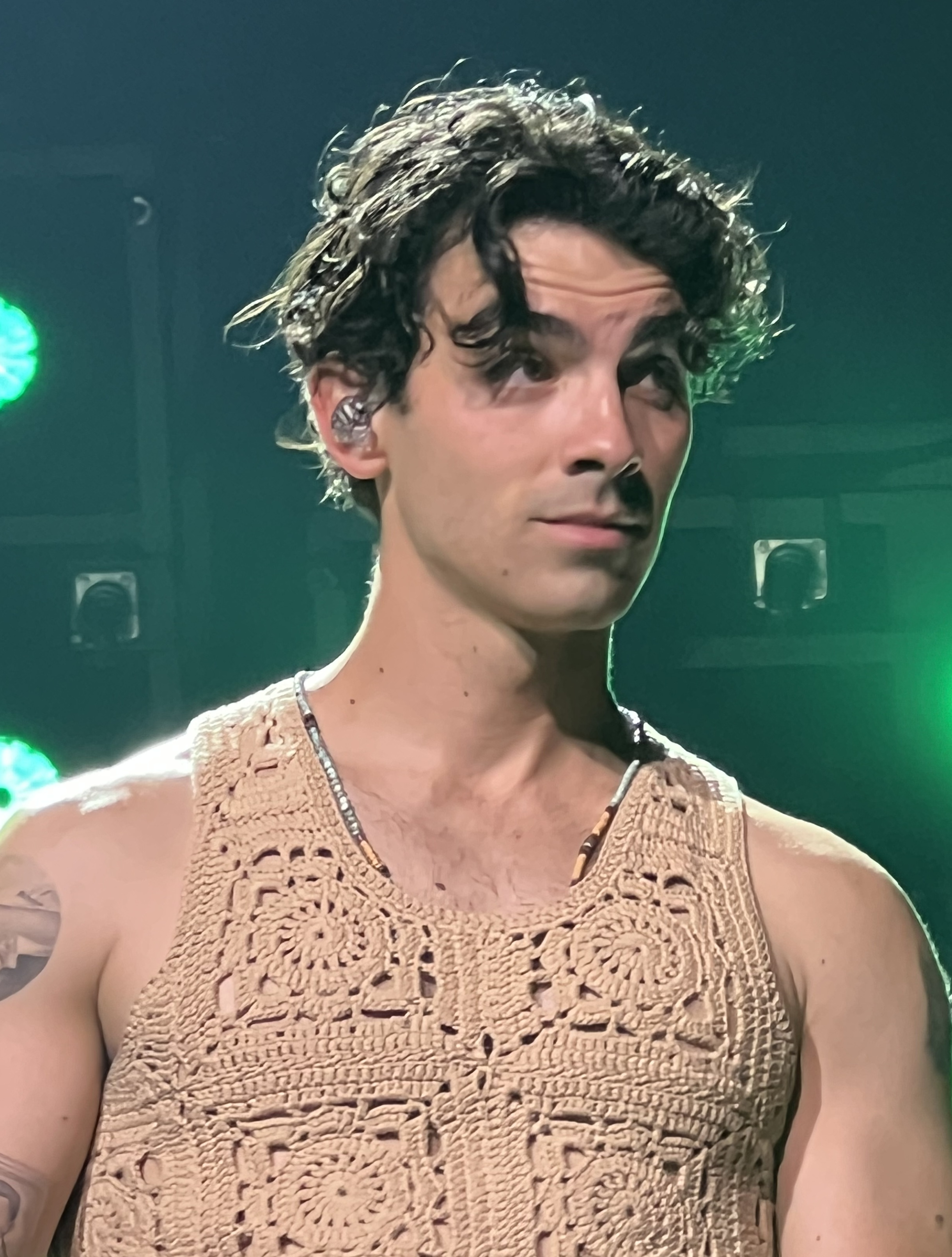
Joe Jonas

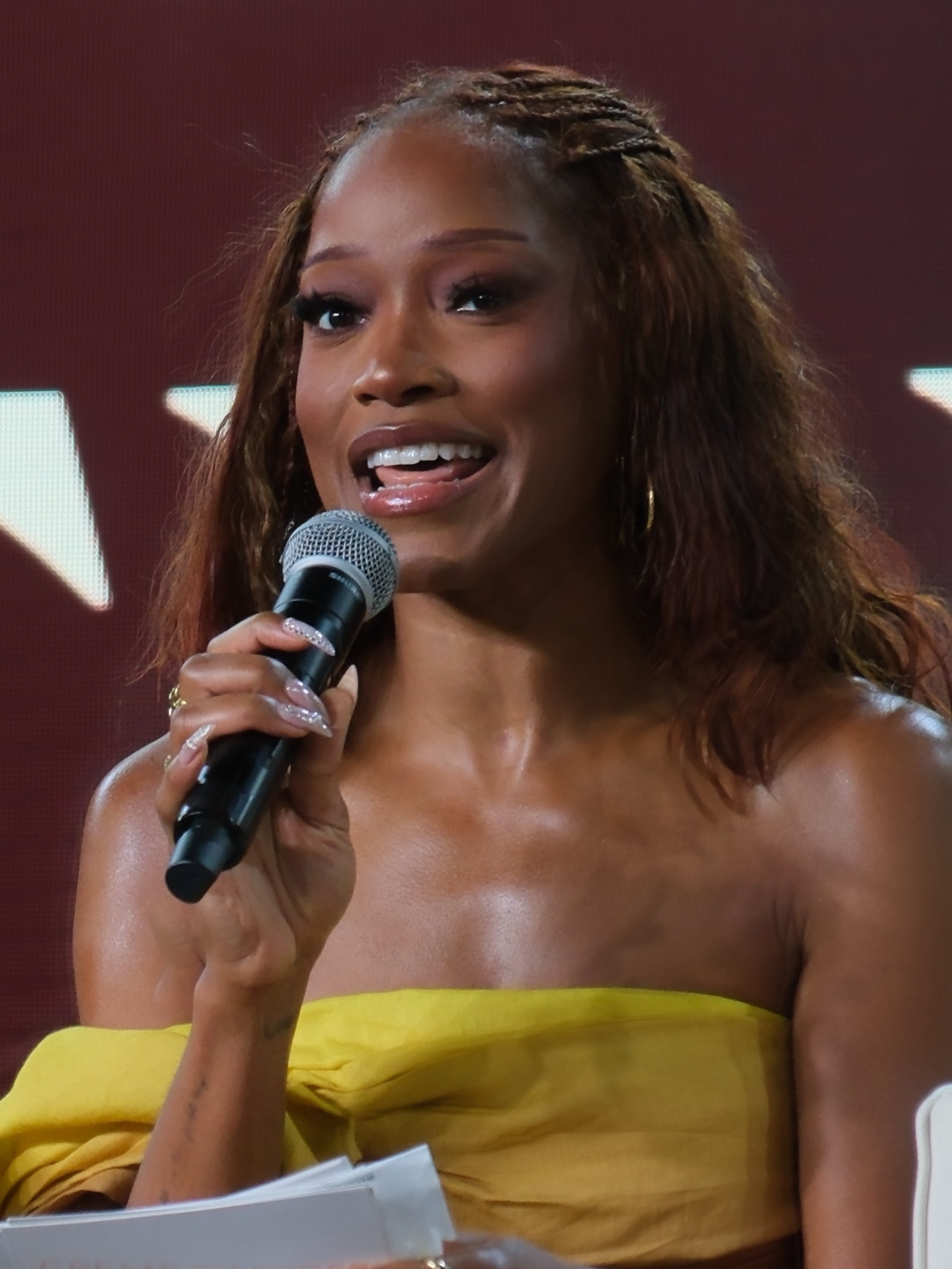
Keke Palmer (host)

On August 4, 2026, it was announced that Riley Green and Queen Latifah would reprise their roles as coaches from last season, but Adam Levine and Kelly Clarkson would not return. It was also announced that former The Voice Australia coach Joe Jonas would join the show as a new coach.

Carson Daly did not return, making this the first season to not feature him as host; his replacement was announced to be Keke Palmer. Daly will still serve as a producer during the season. This is the first season to not feature any of the original coaches or host from the inaugural season.

This is the second season, following the twenty-ninth, to feature only three coaches. It is also the second season to be branded under a different title, The Voice: Celebrity. Additionally, it is the first season to feature the most recently appointed coaches and host.

=== Additions and changes ===
This season is featured as a celebrity spin-off, featuring a group of actors, musicians, athletes, comedians, reality TV stars and influencers showing off their vocal talent.

== Teams ==
Teams color key
Winner	Eliminated in the Semifinals
Runner-up	Eliminated in the Playoffs
Third place	Stolen in the Battles
Fourth place	Eliminated in the Battles

Coaches' teams
Coach	Top 24 Artists
Riley Green	
Queen Latifah	
Joe Jonas	
Note: Italicized names are artists stolen from another team during the battles (names struck through within former teams).
