= Celeres =

Bodyguard of the kings of Rome

The celeres (Latin: [ˈkɛɫ̪ɛre:s], Ancient Greek: κελέριοι) were the bodyguard of the kings of Rome and the earliest cavalry unit in the Roman military. Traditionally said to have been established by Romulus, the legendary founder and first King of Rome, the celeres comprised three hundred men, ten chosen by each of the curiae. The celeres were the strongest and bravest warriors among the early Roman nobility, and were the bravest and most loyal soldiers in the army. The celeres may also have originated in the fourth century BC when the Romans adopted cavalry from the Samnites. The name of celeres was generally believed to have arisen from their celeritas, or swiftness, but Valerius Antias maintained that their first commander was named "Celer", (Note: Celer was a typical Roman cognomen, or surname.) perhaps the same Celer mentioned by Ovid as the foreman of the first fortification built around the Palatine Hill; it was he, rather than Romulus himself, who slew Remus after he overleapt the wall. According to some accounts they were infantry; while according to others they included both or were only cavalry.

Unlike most soldiers of the period, who served only in times of war, the celeres were a permanent force, attending the king at all times, including times of peace. They are generally regarded as a cavalry unit, for the Roman kings traveled and fought on horseback, and in his absence the celeres were led by the tribunus celerum, or tribune of the celeres, who doubled as the king's lieutenant and head of the royal household, holding a position analogous to that of the magister equitum under the Roman Republic. However, Dionysius of Halicarnassus states that the celeres fought mounted only where the ground was favourable, dismounting to fight on foot where the ground was unsuitable for cavalry. Numa Pompilius, the second King of Rome, established certain religious rites that the commanders of the celeres were required to perform.

The celeres remained the king's bodyguard until the establishment of the Republic in 509 BC. The last tribune of the celeres was Lucius Junius Brutus, the nephew of Lucius Tarquinius Superbus, the seventh and last King of Rome, and it was in his capacity as tribune that he convened the comitia curiata to abrogate the king's imperium, while Tarquin was away, besieging Ardea. There was no equivalent body under the early Republic; Roman magistrates were accompanied by the lictors, who had also been established by Romulus, while generals chose the troops they trusted most to protect them. Toward the end of the Republic, veteran soldiers were selected to serve in the cohors praetoria, or praetorian cohort, which in imperial times became the Praetorian Guard.

== Bibliography ==
- Dionysius of Halicarnassus, Romaike Archaiologia (Roman Antiquities).
- Titus Livius (Livy), History of Rome.
- Publius Ovidius Naso (Ovid), Fasti.
- Dictionary of Greek and Roman Antiquities, William Smith, ed., Little, Brown, and Company, Boston (1859).
- Harper's Dictionary of Classical Literature and Antiquities, Harry Thurston Peck, ed. (Second Edition, 1897).
