= Celer (builder) =

According to Ovid's description of the founding of Rome by Romulus (Fasti IV.809 ff.), Celer was the name of an otherwise unknown foreman, appointed by Romulus to oversee the building of Rome's first walls. Ovid, perhaps in part to exonerate the emperor Augustus' great forefather, relates how it was actually this foreman Celer (not Romulus) who struck down Remus for jumping over the wall in its early stages in an act of mockery towards his brother's attempt to fortify the new city. Romulus is portrayed by the poet as putting on a brave front at Remus' funeral, stoically suppressing his tears and grief in order to be a role model for his people. Ovid relates the account in connection with his description of the Roman festival of Parilia (April 21). Ovid also provides additional allusions to Celer's killing of Remus further on in the Fasti, in connection with the festival of Lemuria (Fasti V - May 9).

This may also be the same "Celer" who Valerius Antias claims served as the first head of the Celeres bodyguard during Romulus' reign as king, which would have likely provided the group its name, though Ovid does not mention this.

== See also ==
- Celeres, a personal armed guard maintained by Romulus, associated with Celer.
