= Celerity IT =

- Company type: Public
- Industry: Professional Services
- Genre: Consulting
- Founded: 2002
- Headquarters: Mclean, Virginia, United States
- Area served: Nationwide
- Key people: Curt Schwab(CEO)
- Services: Digital Strategy | Experience Design | Operational Excellence | Digital Products | M&A Advisory
- Owner: Randstad
- Website: www.celerity.com

Celerity IT is a Virginia based consulting firm that specializes in business and technology advisory services such as customer experience, design thinking, operational excellence, intelligent automation, business process and strategy, and a variety of Agile consulting services. Celerity was established in 2002 by Michael Berkman and Lewis Waters in McLean, Virginia. Celerity maintains offices in New York, NY; Harrisburg, PA; Pittsburgh, PA; Richmond, VA; Boston, MA; McLean, VA; Baltimore, MD; and Dallas, TX. They also offer technology services out of Clujj, Romania. Celerity launched Celerity Government Services (CGS) in 2009, which later spun off as Xcelerate Solutions.

In 2013, Celerity acquired 3PC Media, a digital agency based in Pittsburgh, Pennsylvania.

In 2015, Celerity was acquired by the French firm, AUSY.

== Awards ==
In 2014, Celerity's work on the National Geographic website won a Nielsen Norman Award for Best Intranet Design and a 2014 Ektron Site of the Year award for the Intranet category.

In 2015, Celerity's work on the Association of American Medical Colleges (AAMC) website won gold in the 2015 Horizon Interactive Awards in three categories: advocacy, health, and university. The site also won gold at the 2016 AVA Digital Awards.
