= Cele, Texas =

Cele
- Unincorporated community
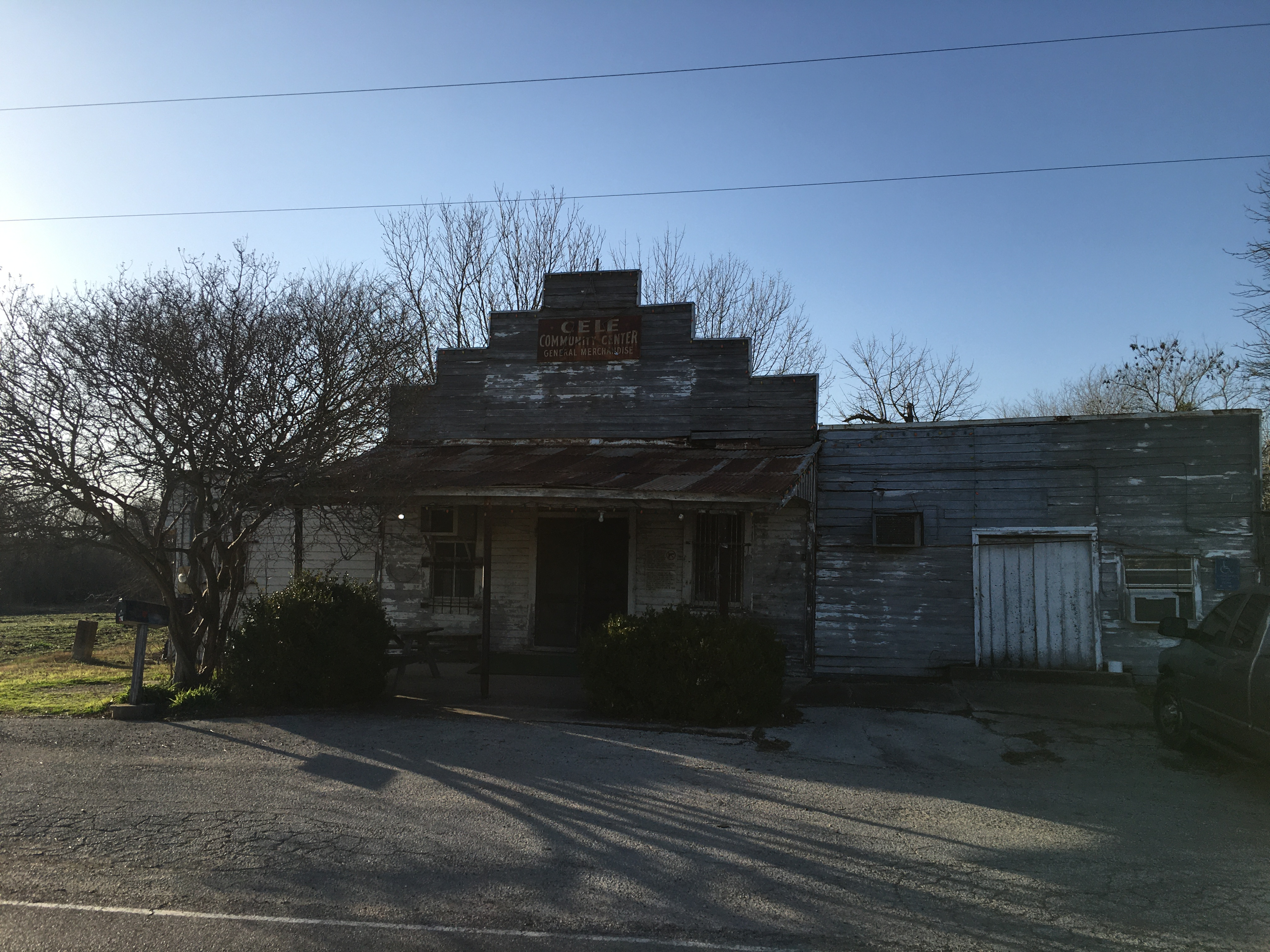
- Old Cele Store

- Location within the state of Texas Cele (the United States)
- Coordinates: 30°26′29″N 97°31′21″W
- Country: United States
- State: Texas
- County: Travis
- Time zone: UTC-6 (Central (CST))
  - Summer (DST): UTC-5 (CDT)

Cele is a small unincorporated community in northeastern Travis County, Texas, United States. It is located within the Greater Austin metropolitan area.

== History ==
Cele was first settled in the 1890s. It was reportedly named for Lucille Custer, who was the daughter of a local store owner. A post office was established at Cele in 1896 and remained in operation until 1902, with an interruption in 1899. John Pitts Johns served as the postmaster. After the post office closed, mail was first sent to the community from New Sweden, but is now sent from Manor. Cele had a population of 25 from the 1930s to the 1960s and was still listed on county maps in 1990.

It had one public business which closed on March 30, 2024, the Cele Store, a barbecue restaurant, a bar, and an events facility.

== Geography ==
Cele is located two miles west of Farm to Market Road 973, 7 mi (11 km) north of Manor, 3 mi (4.8 km) east of Pflugerville, and 25 mi (40 km) away from downtown Austin in northeastern Travis County.

== Education ==
Today, the community is served by the Pflugerville Independent School District. Schools that are zoned for the community are Mott Elementary School, Cele Middle School, and Weiss High School.
