= Celebrity (TV programme) =

- Presented by: Andi Peters; Penny Smith
- Country of origin: United Kingdom
- Original language: English
- No. of seasons: 1
- No. of episodes: 65

Production
- Production location: MTV Studios
- Running time: 25 minutes
- Production company: Carlton

Original release
- Network: ITV
- Release: 25 September – 22 December 2000

Celebrity is a British entertainment news programme, broadcast every weekday afternoon on ITV between 25 September and 22 December 2000.

== Background ==
Celebrity featured entertainment news, celebrity interviews and coverage of events from the world of television, music and film - in a similar format to that of Access Hollywood broadcast on American television.

The programme was presented by former CBBC presenter Andi Peters and GMTV newsreader Penny Smith live from MTV's studios in Camden every weekday afternoon between 5.05 pm and 5.30 pm.

Other contributors included Richard Blackwood, Emma Bunton, Josie d'Arby, Keith Duffy and Melanie Sykes who would present interviews for the programme, or host when Peters and Smith were unavailable.

The programme was intended as a stop-gap after ITV lost the rights for Home and Away to Channel 5 in early 2000, and before the revival of soap opera Crossroads and new daytime drama Night and Day began in 2001 as a permanent replacement in the former Home and Away slot.

The programme received poor viewing figures against BBC Two's Weakest Link and did not return after the first series.
