= Celebrity (disambiguation) =

A celebrity is a person who is famously recognized in a society or societies, be it in the physical or virtual world, such as social media; also, the state of being such a person.

Celebrity or celebrities may also refer to:

== Music ==
- Celebrity (album), 2001, by NSYNC
- "Celebrity" (Barenaked Ladies song), a 2004 UK single
- "Celebrity" (Brad Paisley song), 2003, on Mud on the Tires album
- "C-lebrity", a song by Queen and Paul Rodgers
- "Celebrity", a 2011 song by Big Sean on the album Finally Famous
- "Celebrity", a 2010 song by Lloyd Banks on the album H.F.M. 2 (The Hunger for More 2)
- "Celebrity", a 2019 song by Slayyyter on the mixtape Slayyyter
- "Celebrity" (IU song), 2021, from album Lilac

== Publications ==
- The Celebrity, an 1897 novel by the American author Winston Churchill

== Film and television ==
- Celebrity (1928 film), American silent comedy
- Celebrity (1998 film), by Woody Allen
- Celebrity (TV programme), 2000, UK
- Celebrity (American TV series), 1984 miniseries
- Celeb, British TV series with Harry Enfield and Amanda Holden
- Celebrity (South Korean TV series), 2023
- The Voice: Celebrity, the subtitle of the 31st season of the American singing competition The Voice

== Other uses ==
- Chevrolet Celebrity, a car, 1982–1990
- Fisher Celebrity, homebuilt aircraft
- Celebrity (game), a party game
- Celebrity Cruises, a cruise line
- Celebrity tomato, a tomato cultivar
- Celebrities Nightclub, a gaybar in Vancouver, Canada; also called just "Celebrities"
- Celebrities Radio (106.6 FM), Jakarta, Indonesia

== See also ==
- Mr. Celebrity (disambiguation)
