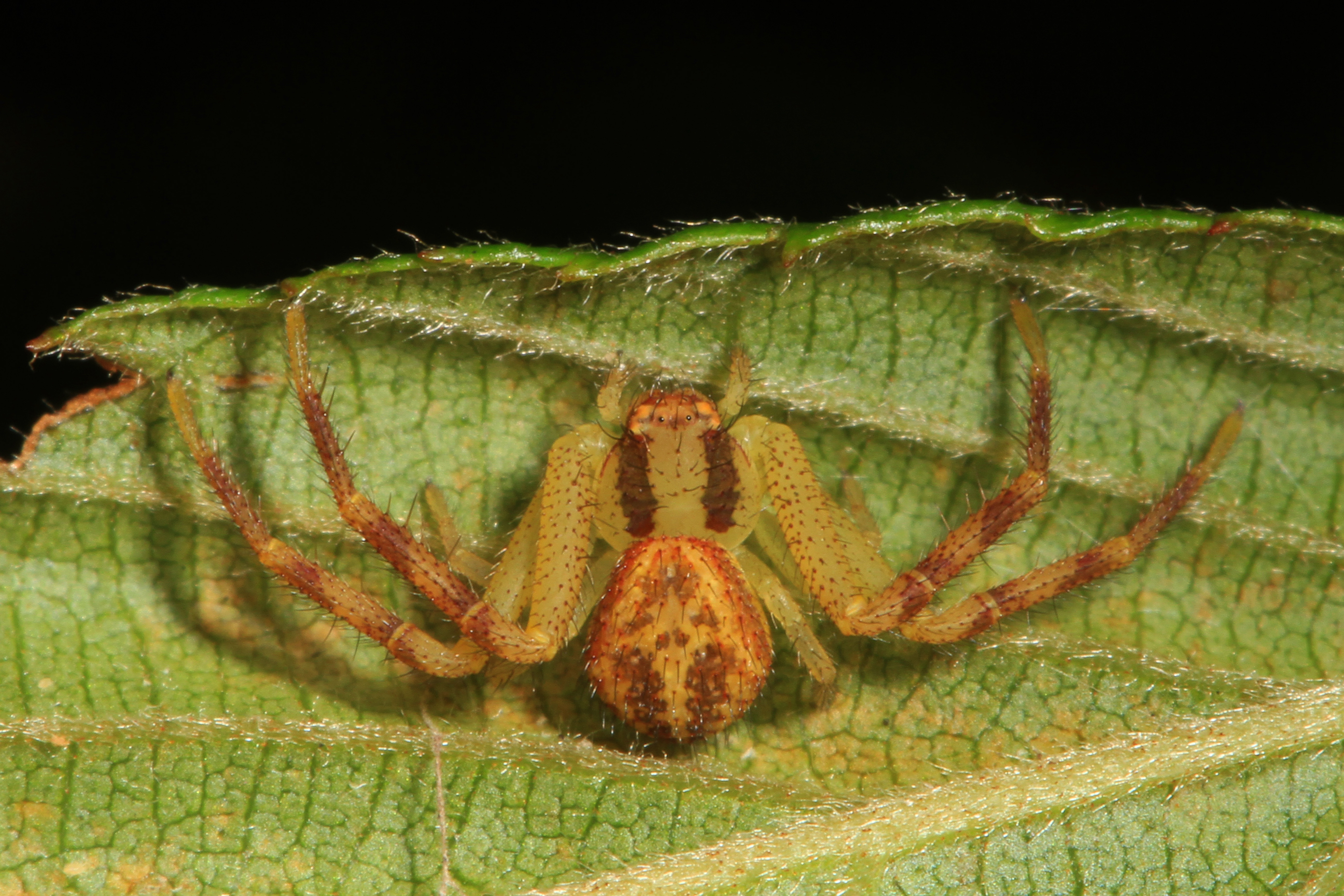

Scientific classification
- Domain: Eukaryota
- Kingdom: Animalia
- Phylum: Arthropoda
- Subphylum: Chelicerata
- Class: Arachnida
- Order: Araneae
- Infraorder: Araneomorphae
- Family: Thomisidae
- Genus: Mecaphesa
- Species: M. asperata

Binomial name
- Mecaphesa asperata (Hentz, 1847)

Synonyms
- Thomisus asperatus; Misumena rosea; Misumena foliata; Misumena placida; Misumena asperatus; Misumessus asperatus

= Mecaphesa asperata =

Species of spider

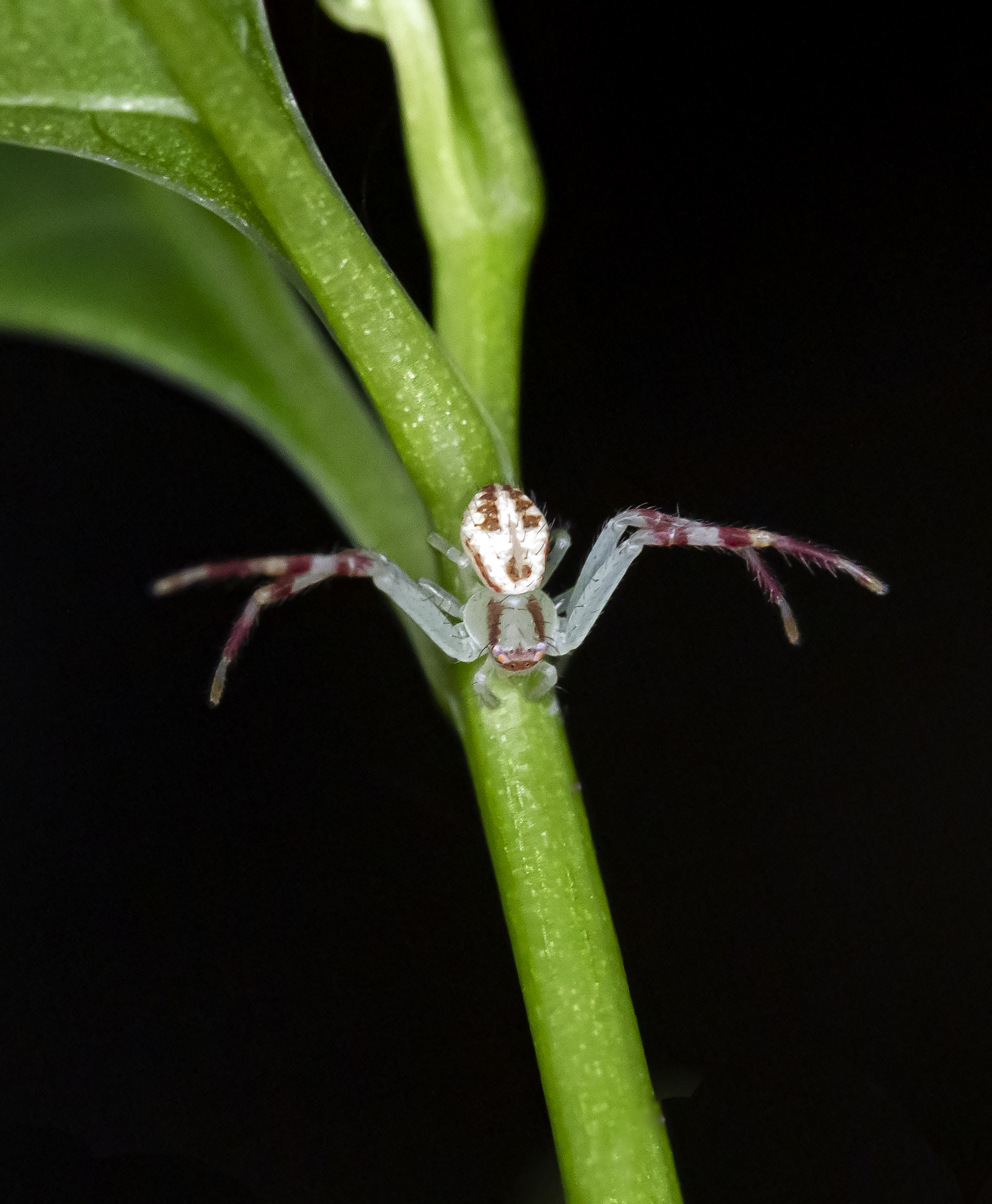
Northern crab spider (Mecaphesa asperata) on a flower stem

Mecaphesa asperata, the northern crab spider, is a species of crab spider in the family Thomisidae, found in North and Central America, and the Caribbean. It is a species of the 'flower spiders', so-called because they generally hunt in similarly coloured flowers for visitors such as bees and flies, and is a much smaller nearctic relative of the better-known Goldenrod Spider (Misumena vatia).

Mecaphesa asperata was formerly in the genus Misumenops under the name Misumenops asperatus.

Howell (2004) provides the following diagnostic/identifying characteristics: "M. asperatus is distinguished from Misumenoides and Misumena in that the carapace, abdomen and legs are distinctively covered with numerous short stiff spines. The ocular region is white. On the anterior half, the abdomen has red streaks laterally. On the posterior half, the abdomen has a mottled brown to red-brown V-shaped mark pointed towards the posterior. All legs are yellow, except the tibia and metatarsus I bear red annuli."

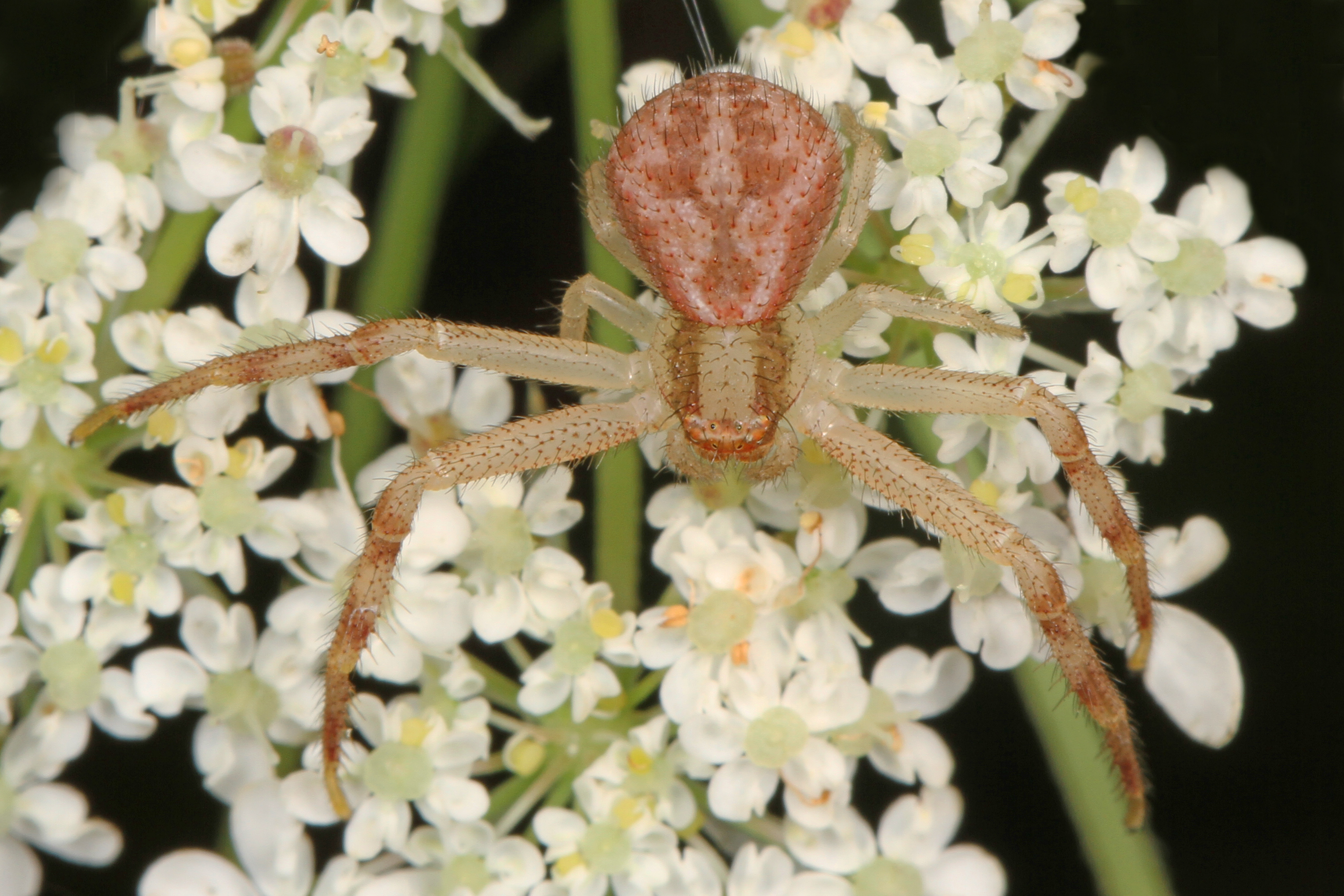
Northern crab spider, Mecaphesa asperata

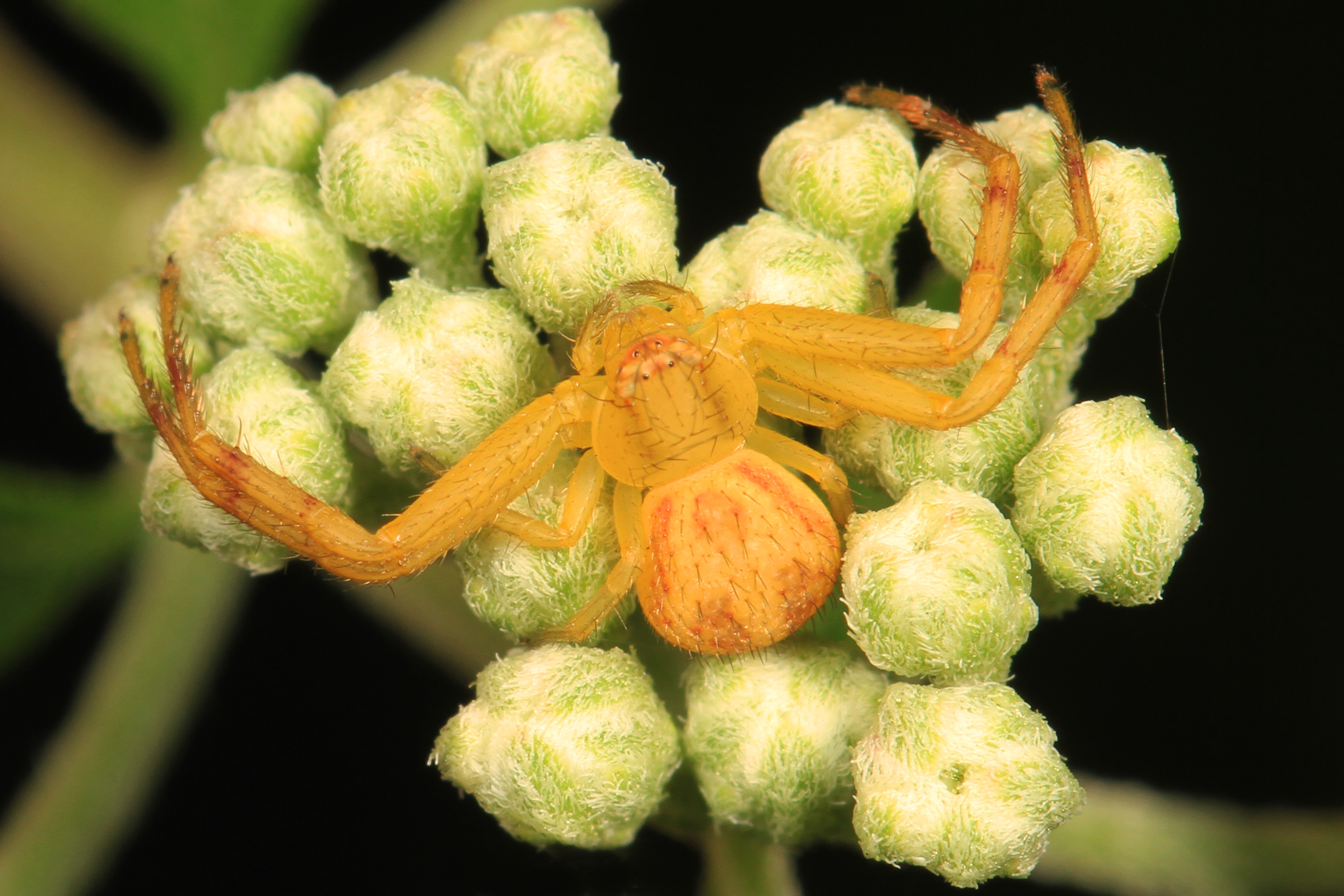
Northern crab spider, Mecaphesa asperata
