= Celler =

Celler may refer to:

== People ==
- Branko Celler, Australian academic
- Emanuel Celler (1888–1981), American politician
- Miroslav Celler (1991–2023), Slovakian squash player

== Places ==
- Celler Schloss or Celle Castle, Germany
- Serra d'En Celler, Spain
