= Misumena oblonga =

Scientific classification
- Domain: Eukaryota
- Kingdom: Animalia
- Phylum: Arthropoda
- Subphylum: Chelicerata
- Class: Arachnida
- Order: Araneae
- Infraorder: Araneomorphae
- Family: Thomisidae
- Genus: Misumena
- Species: M. oblonga

Binomial name
- Misumena oblonga O. Pickard-Cambridge, 1885

Species of spider

Misumena oblonga is a spider species found in Yarkant County of western China. A close relative, also from the Misumena genus, is Misumena vatia.

== See also ==
- List of Thomisidae species
