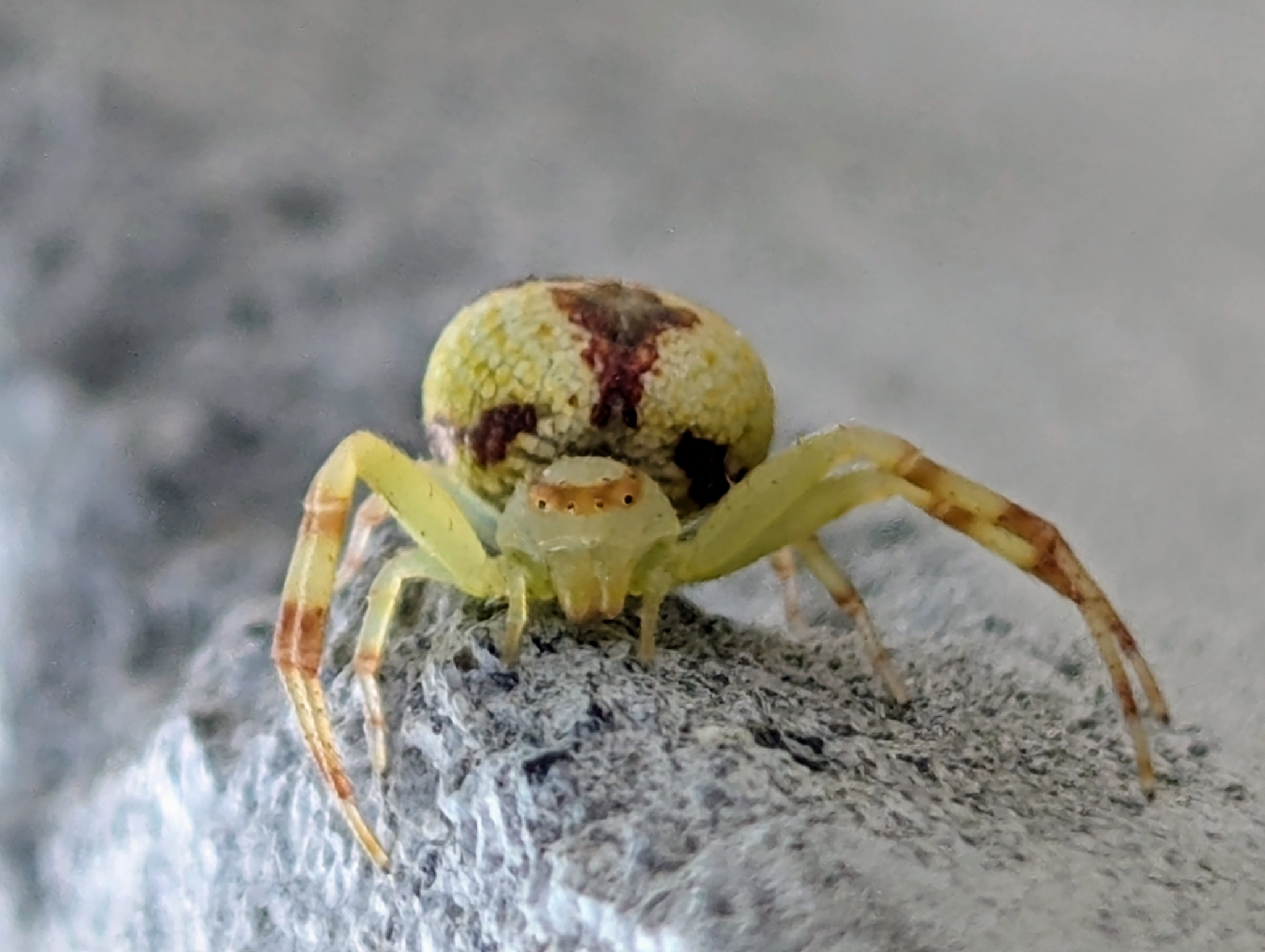
- female from India
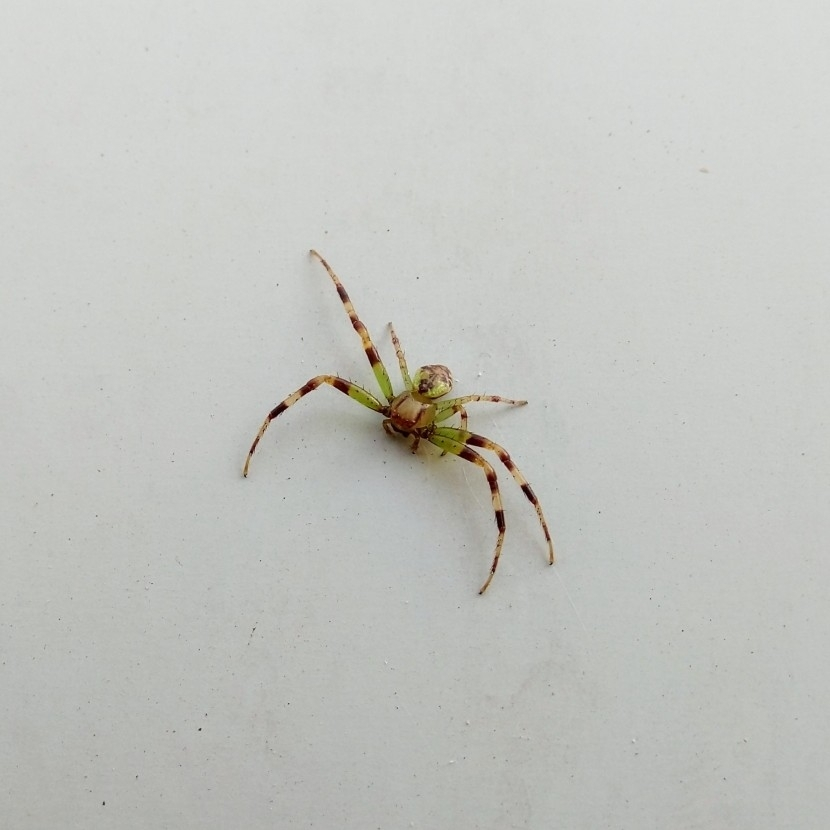
- male from India

Scientific classification
- Kingdom: Animalia
- Phylum: Arthropoda
- Subphylum: Chelicerata
- Class: Arachnida
- Order: Araneae
- Infraorder: Araneomorphae
- Family: Thomisidae
- Genus: Ebrechtella
- Species: E. concinna

Binomial name
- Ebrechtella concinna (Thorell, 1877)

Synonyms
- Diaea concinna Thorell, 1877; Diaea subargentata O. Pickard-Cambridge, 1885; Misumena dierythra Thorell, 1892; Ebrechtella fruhstorferi Dahl, 1907; Misumena gamma Chrysanthus, 1964; Misumena silveryi Tikader, 1965; Misumenops subargentatus Marusik, 1993; Misumenops maygitgitus Barrion & Litsinger, 1995

= Ebrechtella concinna =

Species of spider

Ebrechtella concinna is a species of crab spider in the family Thomisidae. It is widely distributed across the Oriental region, ranging from Pakistan to the Philippines.

== Etymology ==
The specific name concinna is derived from Latin, meaning "elegant" or "neat", likely referring to the spider's appearance and markings.

== Taxonomy ==
Ebrechtella concinna was originally described as Diaea concinna by Tamerlan Thorell in 1877 based on material from "Celebes" (Sulawesi). The species has a complex taxonomic history, with numerous synonyms created by different authors who described what are now considered the same species from various locations across its range.

In 2004, Pekka T. Lehtinen transferred the species to the genus Ebrechtella and synonymized several related species, including Ebrechtella fruhstorferi, Misumena gamma, M. silveryi, Misumenops subargentatus, and M. maygitgitus.

== Distribution ==
E. concinna has a wide distribution across the Oriental region. It has been recorded from Pakistan, India, Bangladesh, Myanmar, Thailand, Malaysia, Singapore, Indonesia (Sulawesi, New Guinea), and the Philippines.

== Description ==
Ebrechtella concinna is a medium-sized crab spider with the smaller males measuring approximately 2.5 millimeters in body length. The cephalothorax is yellowish-brown to brownish-yellow in coloration, with the front portion being broader and slightly truncated. There is often an arrow-head-shaped yellow marking on the back portion of the cephalothorax.

The abdomen is oval and moderately convex above, broadest toward the rear. In males, the upper surface is dull yellowish, covered with scale-like spots of silvery-white coloration. Five impressed spots form a triangle on the front half of the abdomen, with the forward-pointing apex surrounded by dull reddish yellow-brown coloration. Rows of reddish yellow-brown blotches extend backwards from these spots toward the spinnerets.

Females are generally lighter in coloration than males, with less distinct markings on the abdomen apart from the five impressed spots and patches near the spinnerets. The legs in both sexes are relatively long, with the first and second pairs being the longest and strongest. The legs are brownish-yellow with darker reddish-brown markings that give them an annulated appearance.
