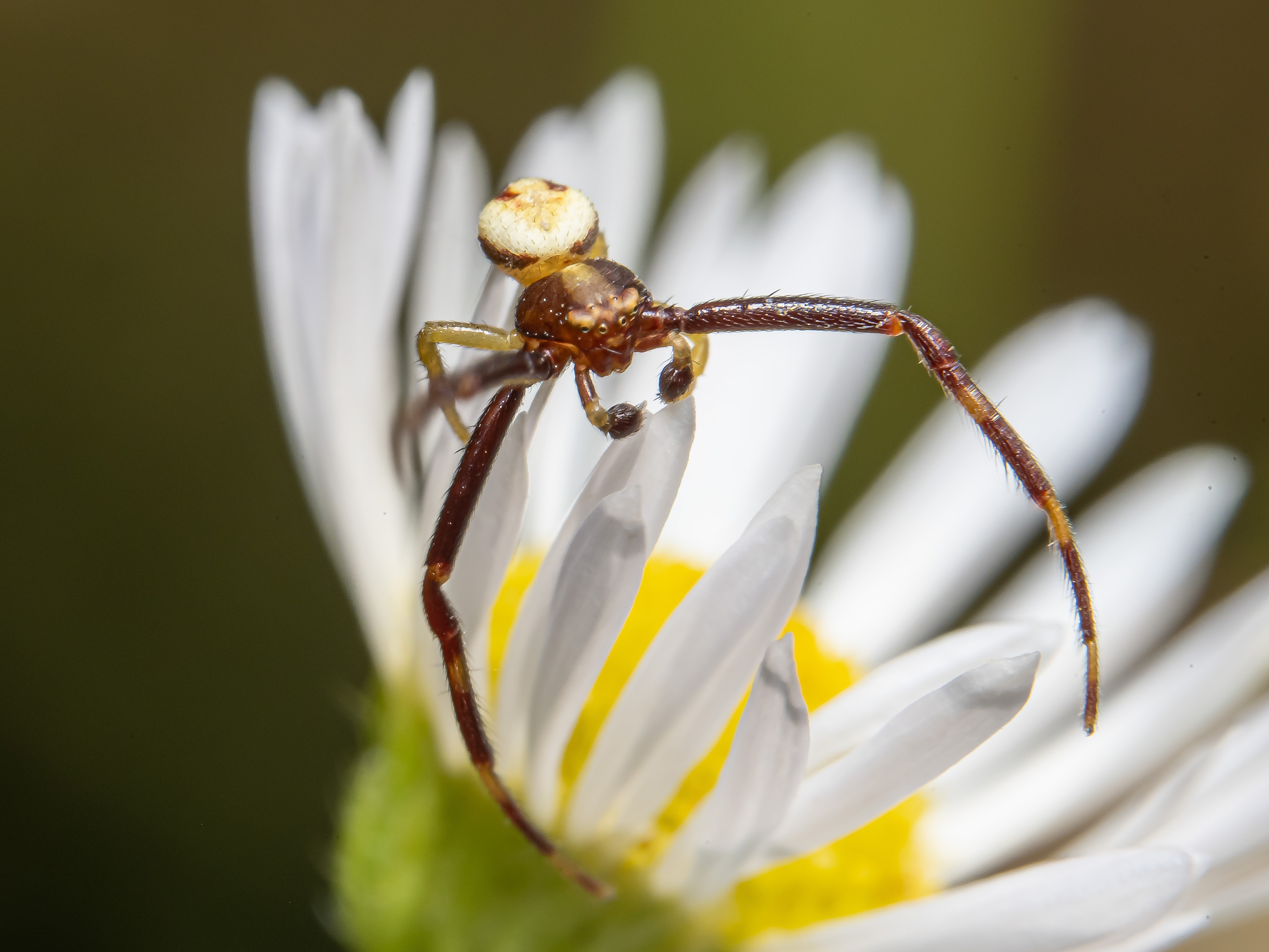
- Male

Scientific classification
- Kingdom: Animalia
- Phylum: Arthropoda
- Subphylum: Chelicerata
- Class: Arachnida
- Order: Araneae
- Infraorder: Araneomorphae
- Family: Thomisidae
- Genus: Misumena
- Species: M. vatia

Binomial name
- Misumena vatia (Clerck, 1757)

Synonyms
- List: Araneus vatius; Aranea calycina; Aranea 4-lineata; Aranea kleinii; Aranea osbekii; Aranea hasselquistii; Aranea uddmanni; Aranea scorpiformis; Aranea virginea; Aranea citrea; Aranea citrina; Aranea sulphereoglobosa; Aranea sulphurea; Aranea quinquepuncata; Aranea albonigricans; Aranea calicina; Aranea cretata; Misumena citrea; Thomisus citreus; Thomisus calycinus; Thomisus dauci; Thomisus pratensis; Thomisus spinipes; Thomisus scorpiformis; Thomisus quadrilineatus; Thomisus viridis; Thomisus phrygiatus; Thomisus devius; Thomisus fartus; Thomisus vatius; Pachyptile devia; Thomisus cucurbitinus; Misumena oblonga; Misumena calycina; Misumena occidentalis; Misumenops vatia

= Misumena vatia =

- Female with prey silver-spotted skipper (Hesperia comma)

Species of spider

Misumena vatia is a species of crab spider found in Europe and North America. In North America, it is called the goldenrod crab spider or flower (crab) spider, as it is commonly found hunting in goldenrod sprays and milkweed plants. They are called crab spiders because of their unusual ability to walk sideways as well as forwards and backwards. Both males and females of this species progress through several molts before reaching their adult sizes, though females must molt more to reach their larger size. Females can grow up to 10 mm (0.39 in) while males are quite small, reaching 5 mm (0.20 in) at most. Misumena vatia are usually yellow or white or a pattern of these two colors. They may also present with pale green or pink instead of yellow, again, in a pattern with white. They have the ability to change between these colors based on their surroundings through the molting process. They have a complex visual system, with eight eyes, that they rely on for prey capture and for their color-changing abilities. Sometimes, if Misumena vatia consumes colored prey, the spider itself will take on that color.

Misumena vatia feed on common insects, often consuming prey much larger than themselves. They use venom to immobilize their prey, though they are harmless to humans. They face threats due to parasites and larger insects. For Misumena vatia, survival depends on the choice of hunting site. The spiders closely monitor multiple sites to see if others nearby are frequented by greater numbers of potential prey. The primary sex ratio is biased toward females. Females are stationary and choose a flower to settle on, while males cover great distances searching for mates. Females do not emit pheromones; rather, they leave "draglines" of silk behind them as they move, which males follow. Females live longer than males, on average. After mating, females guard their nests until the young have hatched, after which they die.

== Taxonomy and phylogeny ==
The species Misumena vatia was first described by Swedish arachnologist and entomologist Carl Alexander Clerck in his book Aranei Svecici. Misumena vatia belongs to the family Thomisidae, or spiders known as crab spiders. The family includes more than 2,000 species, which are found all over the world. The genus Misumena includes many other species which are found worldwide. Misumena vatia falls into the Thomisus clade. Other clades in the family Thomisidae include the Borboropactus clade, the Epidius clade, and the Stephanopis clade.

=== Similar species ===
Close relatives include Mecaphesa asperata, which is also found in North America, as well as Central America and the Caribbean. It is similar in size and shape but is light-gray to brown with pink stripes on the abdomen and cephalothorax. It is also coated with hairs that are short and stiff.

Similar species of the Misumenoides and Misumenops genera tend to be found south of Misumena vatia’s home range, but some species, such as Misumenoides formosipes, are found in North America as well. Philodromidae is a closely related family of wandering spiders. These spiders differ from those in the family Thomisidae in that their front legs are of a similar length as their back legs. Thus, their hunting style is quite different.

== Description ==
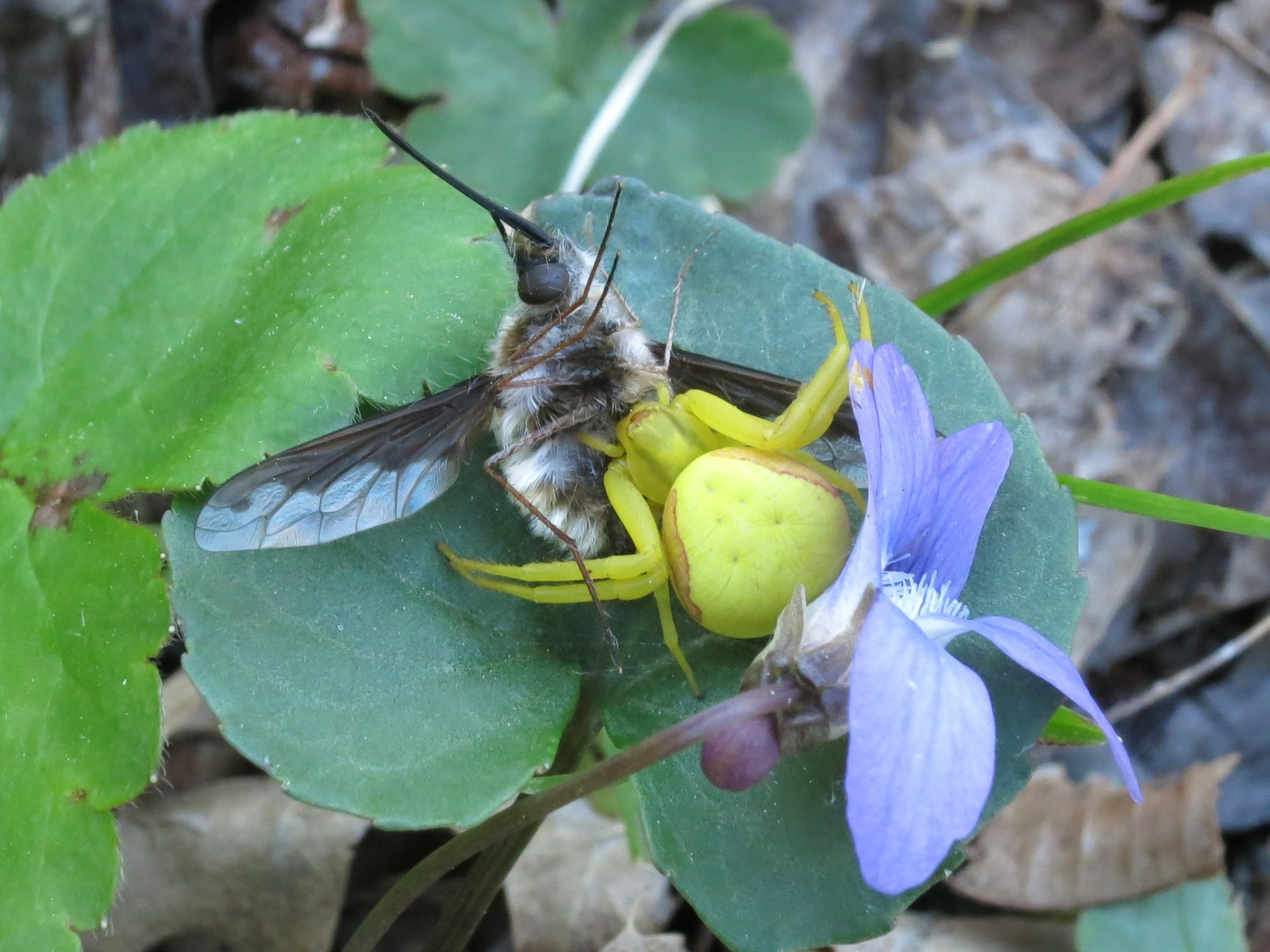
Eating a bee fly

This species has a wide, flat body that is short and crab-like. It can walk sideways in addition to being able to move forward and backward. Of its eight legs, the first two pairs are the longest. These sets of legs are usually held open, as the spider uses them to capture its prey. Misumena vatia is harmless to humans, as its fangs are not powerful enough to penetrate human skin and its venom is too weak to harm larger animals.

=== Color ===
These spiders may be yellow or white. This ultimately depends on the flower on which they are hunting (active camouflage). Younger females especially, which may hunt on a variety of flowers such as daisies and sunflowers, have a strong tendency to adapt to the color of the surrounding flower. However, the color-changing process is not instant and can require up to 25 days to complete. Older females need large amounts of relatively large prey to produce the best possible clutch of eggs. In North America, they are most commonly found in goldenrods, bright yellow flowers which attract large numbers of insects, particularly in autumn. It is often very hard even for a searching human to spot this spider on a yellow flower. These spiders are sometimes called 'banana spiders' because of their striking yellow color.

Females have light complexions, either white or yellow with darker sides. They may have some markings on the abdomen that can be brown or red. These markings are genetically determined and not affected by a background color change. Males are darker than females, with red or brown outer shells. They have a characteristic white spot in the middle that continues through the area around the eyes. Males specifically have two sets of red and white bands both dorsally and laterally. Similar species of the crab spiders appear in a variety of colors such as those of the genus Diaea, which can be lime green, or some species of Xysticus and Coriarchne which are brown.

=== Color change ===
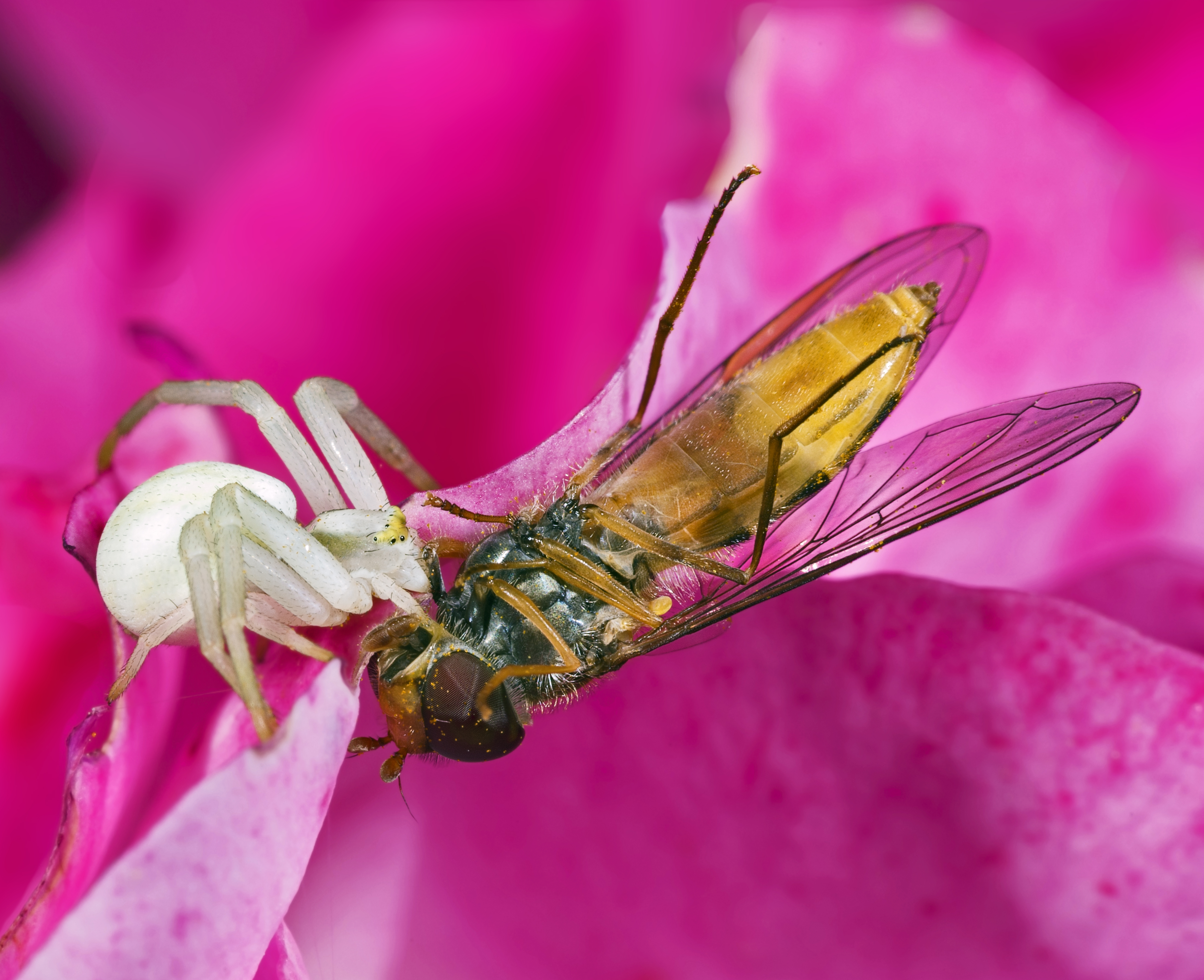
Because of their photoreceptors, arthropods see the white form of the spider only as a dark shape against a dark background when it sits on pink flowers.

These spiders change color based on visual cues. The color-change is most obvious on females of this species. The ability of males and juveniles to change color has not been documented. Two other known spiders with this color change ability include Thomisus onustus and Thomisus spectabilis. Depending on the color of flower they see around them, they can secrete a liquid yellow pigment into the body's outer cell layer. The baseline color of the spider is white. In its white state, the yellow pigment is sequestered beneath the outer cell layer so that inner glands which are filled with white guanine are visible. They are able to match with greater accuracy to white flowers, such as Chaerophyllum temulum (the rough chervil) in particular, compared to yellow flowers based on the spectral reflectance functions. While the spider is residing on a white plant, it tends to excrete the yellow pigment instead of storing it in its glands. In order to change back to yellow, the spider must first produce enough of the yellow pigment. For this reason it takes these spiders much longer to turn from white to yellow than it does for them to go from yellow to white. The color change from white to yellow can take between 10 and 25 days while the opposite color change takes only about six days. The yellow pigments are kynurenine and 3-hydroxykynurenine. Color changes are induced by visual cues and spiders with impaired vision lose this ability.

Notably, spiders of this species sometimes choose to hunt on flowers that, to the human eye, they do not appear to match in color. For instance, they can be found hunting on the pink petals of the pasture rose (Rosa carolina). The spider appears white, or changes to white, causing it to stand out to human observers. Arthropods, on the other hand, serve as both predators and prey to Misumena vatia, and have photoreceptors that allow them to see ultraviolet, blue, and green light but oftentimes lack red receptors altogether. As a result, Misumena vatia is camouflaged, appearing dark on a dark background.

=== Sexual dimorphism ===
Misumena vatia is highly sexually dimorphic. Females are larger than males and tend to fall between 6–9 mm (0.24–0.35 in) in length. Males, on the other hand, are only 3–4 mm (0.12–0.16 in) long. The female's legs are white or yellow, while the male's first and second legs are brown or red and the third and fourth are yellow. Additionally, in concurrence with the male’s smaller size, the male Misumena vatia molts two fewer times than the female.

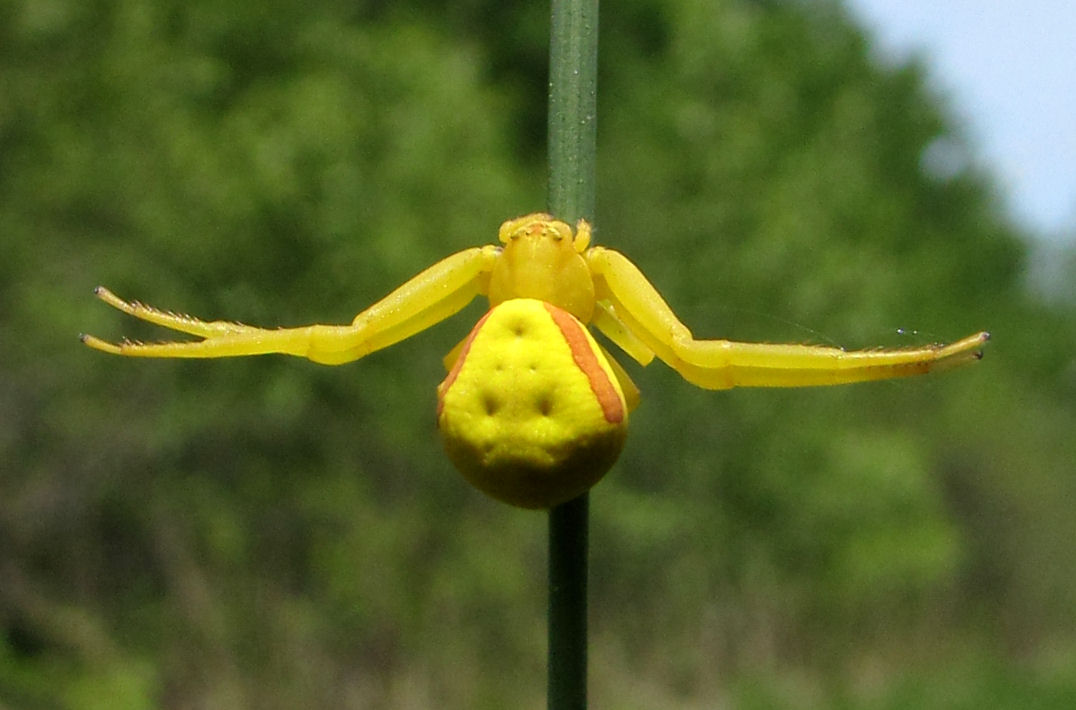
Female, imitating a flower

=== Other physical characteristics ===
Misumena vatia has two rows of eyes. Those in the anterior row are equally spaced and curved backward while those in the second row vary in appearance from animal to animal, and can be curved more or less than the first. The area around the eyes is narrower in the front than the back. The spider's hair is erect and can be either filiform or rod-shaped. The legs do not have spines, except under the tibia and metatarsus of the first two sets of legs. The appearance of the clypeus and the structure of the cephalothorax can be used to distinguish the genus Misumena within its subfamily.

== Habitat and distribution ==
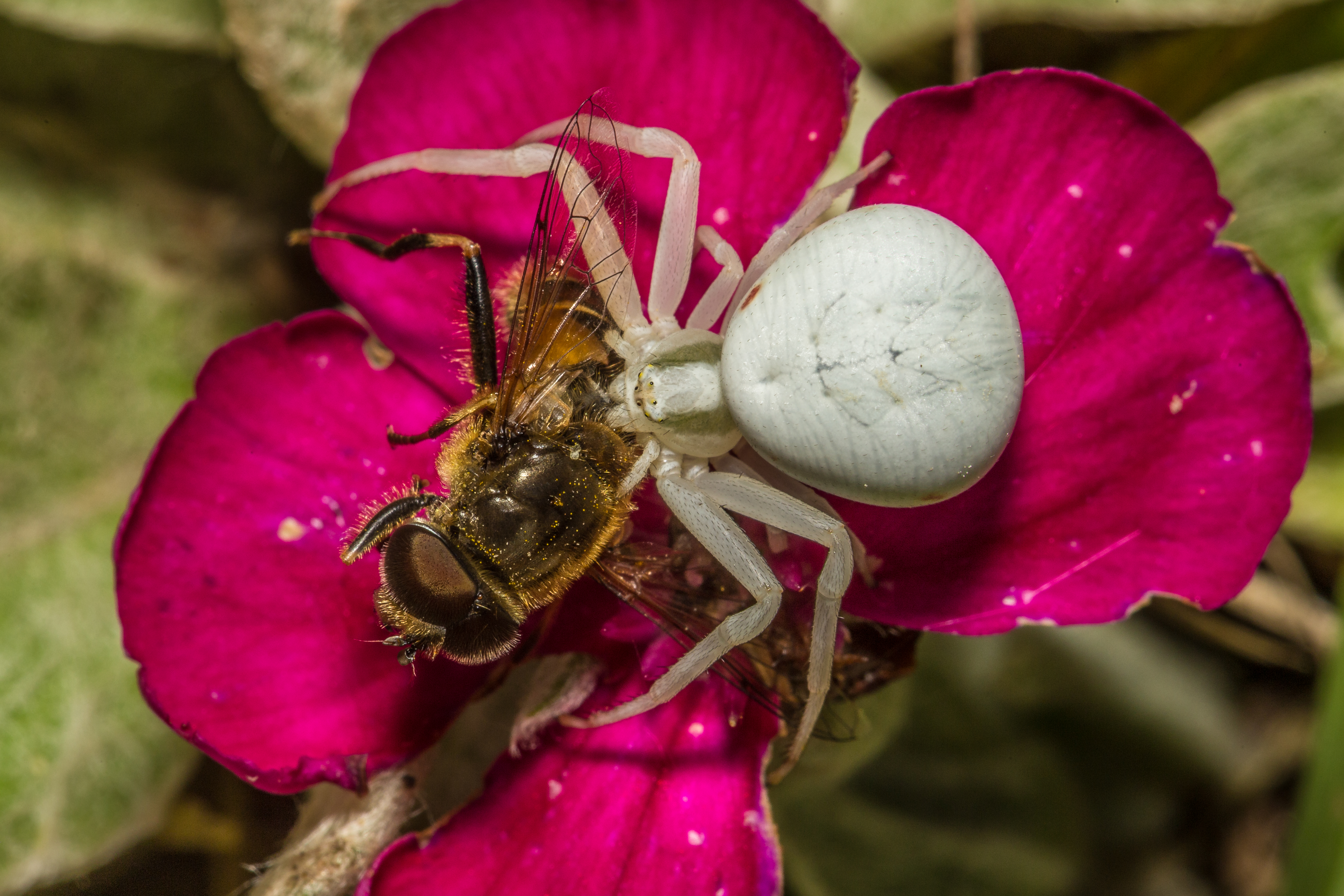
A Misumena vatia in Germany

Misumena vatia is found only in North America and Europe. Other species of crab spiders, however, can be found all over the world. The species prefers a temperate climate and generally inhabits forest biomes. Misumena vatia is terrestrial and can be found on several plants and flowers such as milkweed and goldenrod in North America, as well as trillium, white fleabane (Erigeron strigosus), ox-eye daisy (Chrysanthemum leucanthemum), red clover (Trifolium pratense) and buttercups (Ranunculus acris)."

=== Home range ===
Females of this species do not travel more than a few yards (meters) from their feeding location. They are attracted by the fragrance of flowers, though other visual and tactile clues also help them choose a territory. Their survival depends on their ability to choose a small area home to flowering plants which will attract prey. Males are highly motile and may disperse great distances as they search for mates. Additionally, spiderlings may travel great distances by ballooning, if they find the area around their nest to be lacking in resources. However, this is risky as there is no guarantee that the search for a new territory will be successful.

=== Patch choice ===
Misumena vatia hunts large prey with a low rate of success. Hunting success rate is highly dependent upon the spider's choice of hunting site. Before they lay their eggs, females are heavy and slow, which necessitates that they choose a hunting site on which to stay. When hunting on their preferred plant of milkweed, they monitor nearby umbels to see if another site would be more profitable. Over the course of a few hours, Misumena vatia may recognize and move to another nearby hunting site. Most often, they move to flowers that produce more nectar and attract more prey, however occasionally some intentionally and consistently pick less profitable sites to hunt on. Thus, the population is dimorphic in terms of patch choice behavior. The reason a minority might choose poorer hunting sites on purpose remains unknown.

== Diet ==
=== Hunting patterns ===
Female attacks small wasp

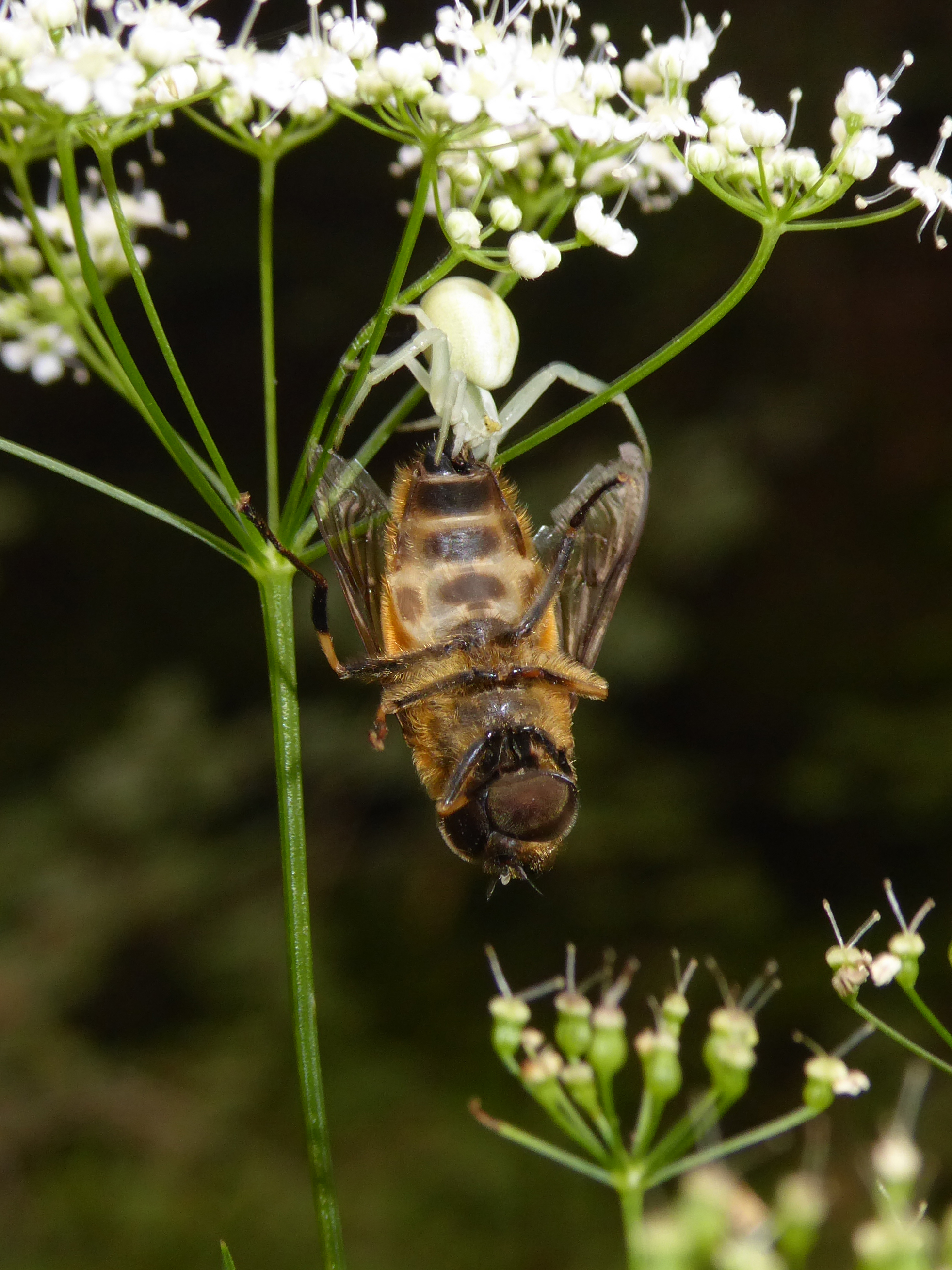
Misumena vatia with prey

Crab spiders are carnivorous, feeding on invertebrate insects such as flies, bees, butterflies, grasshoppers, dragonflies, and hoverflies. Bumblebees (Bombus appositus) provide the spider with the most biomass, but small syrphid flies (Toxomerus marginatus) are the prey captured most frequently. Other frequently captured prey include honeybees (Apis mellifera) and moths. Immature Misumena vatia commonly feed on smaller-sized prey such as thrips, aphids in the family Aphididae, and dance flies in the family Empididae. They may also use nectar and pollen as food sources when prey is scarce.

Misumena vatia primarily depends on its vision to hunt, so it typically finds and captures food during the day. They are commonly found on the upper strata of field vegetation, where females do their hunting, and males look for mates.

The spider can hunt prey larger than itself because of its paralyzing venom. Misumena vatia waits camouflaged, usually on flowering plants, and then grabs prey to inject its venom. Unlike many spiders which wrap their prey in silk, Misumena vatia relies entirely on its venom to immobilize its meals. It then uses its fangs to inject the prey with digestive enzymes before sucking out liquidated insides. This is a form of external digestion. As a result, prey size is not a limiting factor for consumption.

Although Misumena vatia most often hunts during the daytime, there is evidence that it is sometimes driven to hunt at night due to an increase in nocturnal prey activity. This behavior occurs most commonly in response to increased night-time activity by moths in early September.

Misumena vatia has the ability to retain its excretions for at least 50 days and will not excrete when confined to small spaces or near its hunting sites. Excretion may alert predators to the spider's whereabouts.

=== Diet-induced color change ===
Misumena vatia can also change color as a result of prey consumption. Once consumed, colorful prey can show through the thin, transparent epidermis of the abdomen, affecting opisthosomal coloration. Ingestion of red-eyed fruit flies cause the abdomen to turn pink. Coloration changes caused by prey consumption revert to the normal white or yellow within 4–6 days after prey ingestion. Color change intensity is positively correlated with the amount of colorful prey consumed. Color change intensity also decreases with the spider's age. These spiders have been observed to have pink, orange, yellow, brown, green, or white opisthosomas depending on the prey consumed.

== Reproduction and lifecycle ==
Sex ratios among Misumena vatia vary from a ratio of 1.5 females per male at hatching to a ratio of 2.5–5.1 females per male by the time they reach adulthood. Since males must spend considerable time searching for females, they face danger from the environment, reducing their numbers. Males cannot mate multiple times in quick succession but require a two-day interval between matings. In nature, Misumena vatia produces a single brood. However, females are capable of producing another brood if artificially induced.

=== Nests ===
Female Misumena vatia prefer common milkweed (Asclepias syriaca) over spreading dogbane (Apocynum androsaemifolium), pasture rose (Rosa carolina), and chokecherry (Prunus virginiana) for nest construction. Females who lay eggs on milkweed have higher nesting success, which correlates with early survival of clutches. The nest appearance can vary widely, depending on the type of plant on which it is constructed. In the case of the pasture rose and the sensitive fern (Onoclea sinsibilis), nests consist of several small leaves bound together. These nests are more vulnerable to predators though, because they are not as tightly bound as those created on milkweed, and have a greater area that is covered only by silk.

=== Mate-guarding ===
A minority of males—only about ten percent—guard pre-reproductive females as they molt into their adult stage. Almost all males who guard such females mate with them after they have molted. The low level of mate guarding is related to the female-leaning sex ratio expressed by Misumena vatia. Males of this species tend to guard less frequently and exhibit less aggression than other closely related species, such as Misumenoides formosipes, which do not have a female-biased sex ratio.

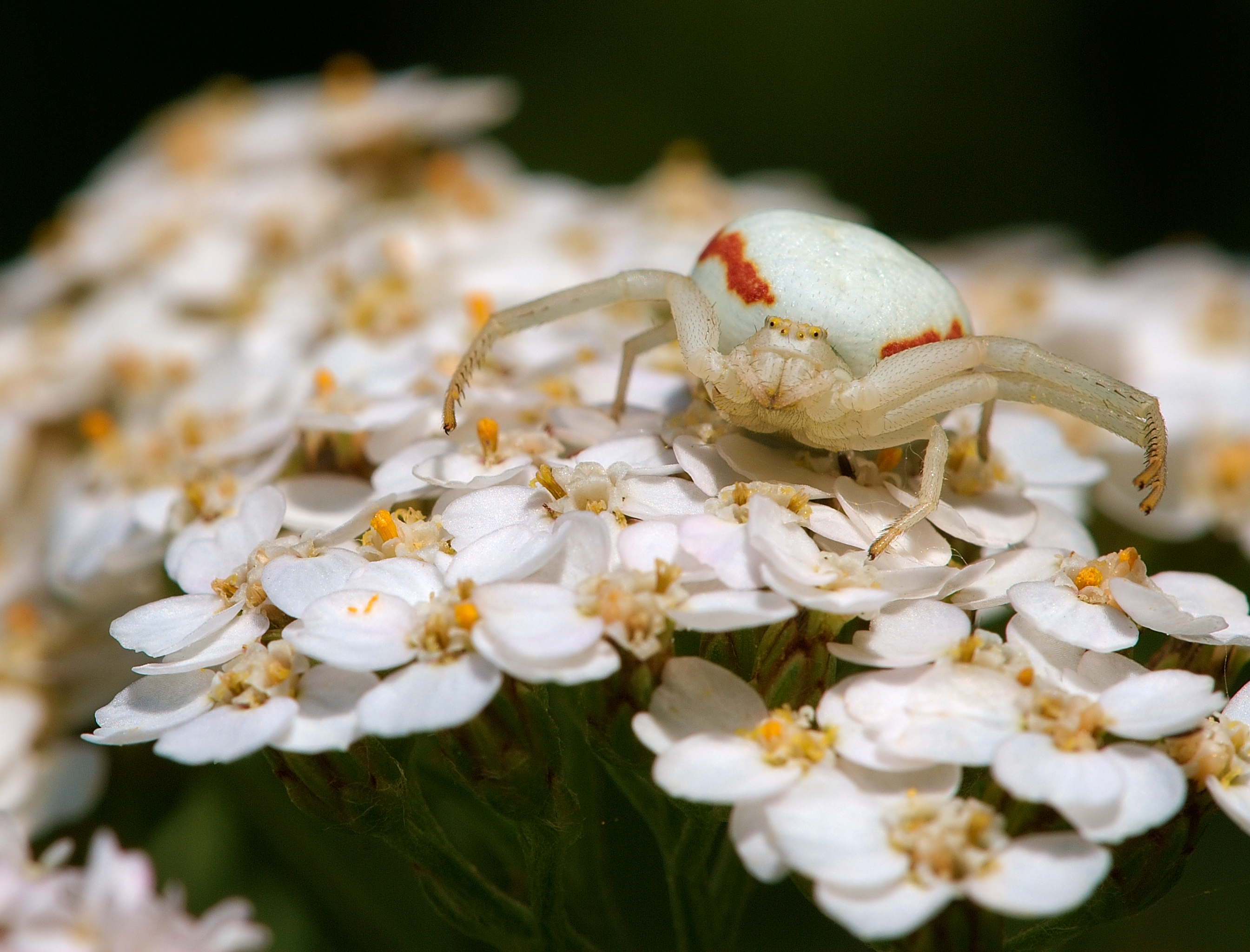
Female on Achillea millefolium

=== Lifecycle ===
In May and early June, males molt into adulthood, with the number of adult males peaking between June 5 to July 15. Females do not molt into adulthood until mid to late June, with numbers of adult females peaking around June 25. After males molt, their body mass does not increase, remaining at about 4 mg (0.00014 oz). Males, however, do undergo body changes as they enter the adult stage. Their front legs lengthen while the abdomen shrinks. Females live an average of two years and spend most of this time guarding their eggs sacs and the territory (flowers) on which they hunt. Males have shorter lifespans by about a month. Only near the end of the female's second year of life will she allow males onto her territory to mate. Females lay their eggs most commonly in the middle of the summer; these hatch after 3.5 weeks. Females usually die very soon after their eggs have hatched, during their second winter. Young undergo one molt within the egg sac, and emerge after hatching as second instars. They can sustain themselves for a few days with the nutrients from their yolk sacs.

== Mating ==
=== Mate-searching behavior ===
The much smaller males scamper from flower to flower in search of females and are often seen missing one or more of their legs. This may be due either to near misses by predators such as birds or to fighting with other males. Males exhibit a random pattern of searching for mates until they discover a female dragline. Females leave these draglines behind them as they search for prey. Males follow the draglines in search of potential mates. Unlike many spider species, the females do not deposit any pheromones on these lines. Males follow the lines mechanically rather than chemically. The tendency for a male to follow a line is highly influenced by its life stage and the stage of the female of interest. Adult males preferentially follow adult female and juvenile female draglines, while penultimate males do not display a specific preference. Male Misumena vatia are also more likely to follow lines laid by their own species than those of a related species.

=== Male–male interactions ===
Two males interested in the same female may compete, since encounters with females are relatively rare. This may include light touching, chasing, foreleg lashing, grappling, and biting between males. If the female is being guarded by an existing male, the guarding male may either fend off the challenger or be replaced. The male which finds the female of interest first has an advantage in any ensuing contest. In this species, unlike many other species of spider, older and younger males are generally the same size. While older males initiate contests more frequently than younger males, the nature of their attacks is less likely to include extensive bodily contact. Younger males win significantly more contests than older males. After a contest between males, the winner immediately mates with the female while the loser retreats.

=== Male–female interactions ===
When a male finds a female, he climbs over her head, over her opisthosoma and onto her underside, where he inserts his pedipalps to inseminate her. The male may wrap the female loosely with silk during copulation. Females have a pair of gonopores which the male pedipalp may enter for copulation. When the male inserts his pedipalp into the female's gonopore he will make rhythmic, vibratory movements that can last from 1–2 seconds. Gonopore contacts of less than 30 seconds will result in unfertilized eggs and a failed copulation. Matings last an average of four minutes.

Males can accurately identify the reproductive condition of potential mates. They prefer to mate with virgin females over those which have previously mated. Males mate for longer with virgin females and produce more pedipalp movements than during copulation with previously-mated females. Males are most likely to enter both gonopores of a virgin female, while they may only enter one gonopore of a previously-mated female. Females have a low probability of mating with a second male, but have a higher probability of mating with a second male than they do a third one.

The female then lays her eggs preferentially on plants from the Asclepias genus (milkweeds). When preparing to lay eggs, she first identifies a suitable location for her brood. She descends the plant stalk down to the leaf that she chooses and then rolls up the end of a leaf. She secures the leaf by spreading silk, creating a cocoon-like structure, and lays her eggs inside the nest she has created. She tends to lay her eggs at night. The young grow to be about 5 mm (0.20 in) by autumn and remain on the ground through winter. Their final molt, from penultimate instars to adults, occurs during May of the next year.

Because Misumena vatia employs camouflaging, it can focus more energy on growth and reproduction rather than on finding food and escaping from predators. As in many Thomisidae species, there is a positive correlation between female weight and egg clutch size, or fecundity. Selection for larger female body size thus increases reproductive success.

=== Sperm quantity ===
This species exhibits a high first-male sperm precedence, so providing a virgin female with a large sperm quantity is advantageous. Because there is a very limited number of virgin females available at any given time, there is strong selective pressure that favors males that provide large sperm quantities. The need to produce a large sperm quantity for each copulation prevents males from remating quickly. Additionally, females are likely to deny subsequent males after their first mating as further reproduction will interfere too strongly with the female's foraging success. More matings are also unfavorable because they can increase the risk of infection with sexually transmitted parasites or diseases.

In some cases, males can tell whether a female has mated previously from a distance. This may be due the female's heightened aggression that manifests after she has mated once. It is more common, however, that in order to assess the reproductive history of a given female, the male must first mount her, which is dangerous for the male as there is a chance the female may attack, capture, and kill him. Since females are difficult to locate and the cost of searching for them is so high, the risk is usually worthwhile to the male. In addition, since locating females is difficult, there is a low chance that another male has previously inseminated a given female, so it is therefore beneficial for males to provide large quantities of sperm. This adaptation is also beneficial in the case that a female loses her first brood. When a female has been inseminated with a large quantity of sperm, she may have enough to fertilize a second brood to replace the lost first brood.

=== Sexual cannibalism ===
Like many other arachnids and insects, Misumena vatia may express sexual cannibalism; however it is only considered moderately common. In cases of precopulatory sexual cannibalism, older males are more likely than younger males to be targets of attack, and are more likely to suffer death or injury as a result of such an attack, especially during the latter half of the mating season. This could be a result of a decreased ability among older males to evade attack from females. Older males do not tend to display riskier mating behavior than younger males. The size of the male does not influence its likelihood of being cannibalized during copulation. Females increase cannibalistic attacks as the mating season progresses. More males tend to be cannibalized after mid July, which could be a result of male aging but is more likely a result of increased female aggression during this time. Non-reproductive cannibalism is uncommon among Misumena vatia. However, it has been observed in individuals in roughly one percent of broods. In these broods, cannibalism tends to occur among spiderlings. Cannibalistic individuals can be up to three times larger than those who are non-cannibalistic.

== Parental care ==
=== Egg-guarding ===
Like many other species, Misumena vatia guards its nest to protect its vulnerable eggs from attack. Nest guarding increases the spider's overall reproductive success by protecting against predation from ichneumonid and dipteran egg predators. These spiders are usually observed guarding the nest by standing on its underside, the most vulnerable face of the nest. Most guarding spiders will remain by the nest until the young have begun to emerge from their eggs—about three weeks. A minority of spiders abandon their nests before spiderlings have hatched, while some may remain until all the young have hatched or longer. Most die within a few days of the hatching of their young.

=== Enemies ===
Parasitization by the ichneumonid wasp Trychosis cyperia, an egg predator, is common. The wasp deposits an egg in the nest and its larva feeds on the eggs. One attack can destroy the nest completely. Misumena vatia experience strong selection to minimize attack from wasps, which is why egg guarding by the female is important for reproductive success. Wasps tend to feed on small egg masses guarded by small spiders, as small spiders cannot defend their nests as effectively. Other known predators include ants, other spiders, birds, lizards, and shrews. When defending the nest from an approaching predator, females typically raise their front legs in a display otherwise observed when they are attacking prey.

== Physiology ==
=== Sensation ===
These spiders respond quickly to motion that is both within and outside of their visual range. To do so, they rely heavily on several types of mechanoreceptors. Tactile hairs sense touch, trichobothria sense air currents, and slit sensilla are sensitive to vibrations and mechanical stresses. While still important, vision plays a less important role in prey detection. Remarkably, Misumena vatia fail to notice prey when it is stationary.

=== Vision ===
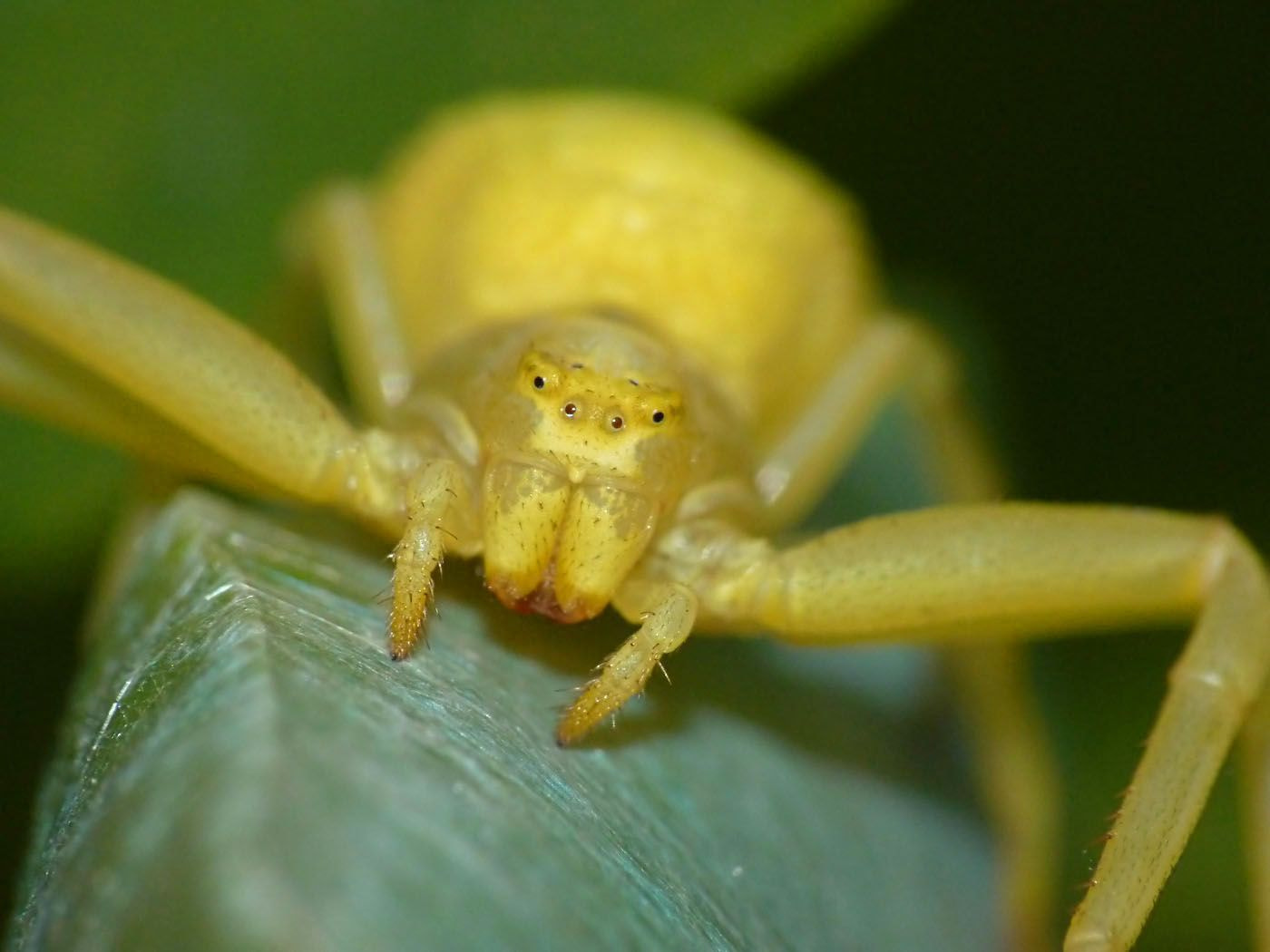
Close-up showing eyes

These spiders have two rows of four eyes each for a total of eight eyes. The antero-lateral (75 μm diameter) and postero-lateral (65 μm diameter) eyes are the larger in size of the four sets of eyes. The antero-median (59 μm diameter) are considered the principal eyes and along with the postero-median (55 μm diameter) constitute the smaller of the sets. All of the eyes other than the principal eyes are considered the secondary eyes. The antero-median eyes appear the clearest, while the other sets of eyes appear darker. The postero-median eyes look directly upward, and their field of view overlaps somewhat with that of the postero-lateral eyes. The antero-lateral and postero-lateral eyes also share a slight overlap in their visual fields. The antero-lateral eyes give these spiders a region of binocular vision. The organization of the antero-lateral, postero-median, and postero-lateral eyes allows these spiders to see nearly their entire upper visual environment.

The four pairs of eyes are similar in structure, all containing a retina, a dioptric apparatus, and a cellular vitreous body. The outermost layer of the eye is the lens. The columnar cells of the vitreous body stand between the lens and the retina, and their nuclei rest next to the retina. Three layers of pigment cells surround the vitreous body. The epidermis is the outer layer, and it contains electron-dense granules and electron-lucent inclusions of micro-crystals. The middle layer contains dark, pigment granules, and the innermost layer contains larger, dark, pigment granules inside glial cells. These layers prevent light that may enter through a nearby transparent cuticle from reaching the retina, keeping each eye isolated. The retina contains photoreceptor cells and other supporting cells.

The principle eyes have a complex and unique organization. They have three different photoreceptive segments. The periphery contains a half-circle of one type of rhabdomere, while the center is pigmented and contains two types of rhabdomeres. These spiders also have a "giant rhabdom" in the lowest layer of the center of the retina. Only the light entering along its optic axis stimulates this giant rhabdom, so the visual information comes in the shape of a dot. Misumena vatia can control the trajectory of the giant rhabdom by moving their eye muscles, which means these single points of visual information are integrated to generate the spider's visual field.

Vision plays an important role in the spider's substrate color matching. Misumena vatia have the necessary physiological machinery to see color, and are most sensitive to wavelengths of light between 340-520 nm. Misumena vatia's principle eyes have tiered retinas, with four layers containing different types of photoreceptors. These spiders have been proven to have green and UV photoreceptors, and likely have many other types which allow them to see a full range of colors. The secondary eyes are dichromal, meaning that they have two types of photoreceptors. Since Misumena vatia use their visual systems to inform color changes, they must be able to see color in their environment and on their own bodies. The visual field of the antero-lateral and antero-medial eyes allow the spider to see its legs, while the postero-lateral eyes see the opisthoma. Since the visual fields are so wide, these spiders see their own bodies and the color of their surroundings, which supports the idea that color matching is facilitated by the visual system.

=== Autotomy ===
Autotomy, the loss of one leg, can happen in a variety of critical situations, including fleeing from predators, fighting, and getting rid of parasites. The disadvantage is obvious, but most spiders can grow back lost limbs if the loss occurs during a juvenile stage and before the final molting.

The loss of an anterior leg is common among males. Over their lifetimes, approximately 30 percent of males will lose one of their anterior legs. One direct disadvantage of losing a leg is a decrease in mobility. Spiders with all eight legs have considerably higher body weights, showing that losing legs negatively impacts foraging and significantly decreases the speed with which they can move along lines. Since females are widely dispersed, the impairment of mobility adversely affects the male’s reproductive success.
