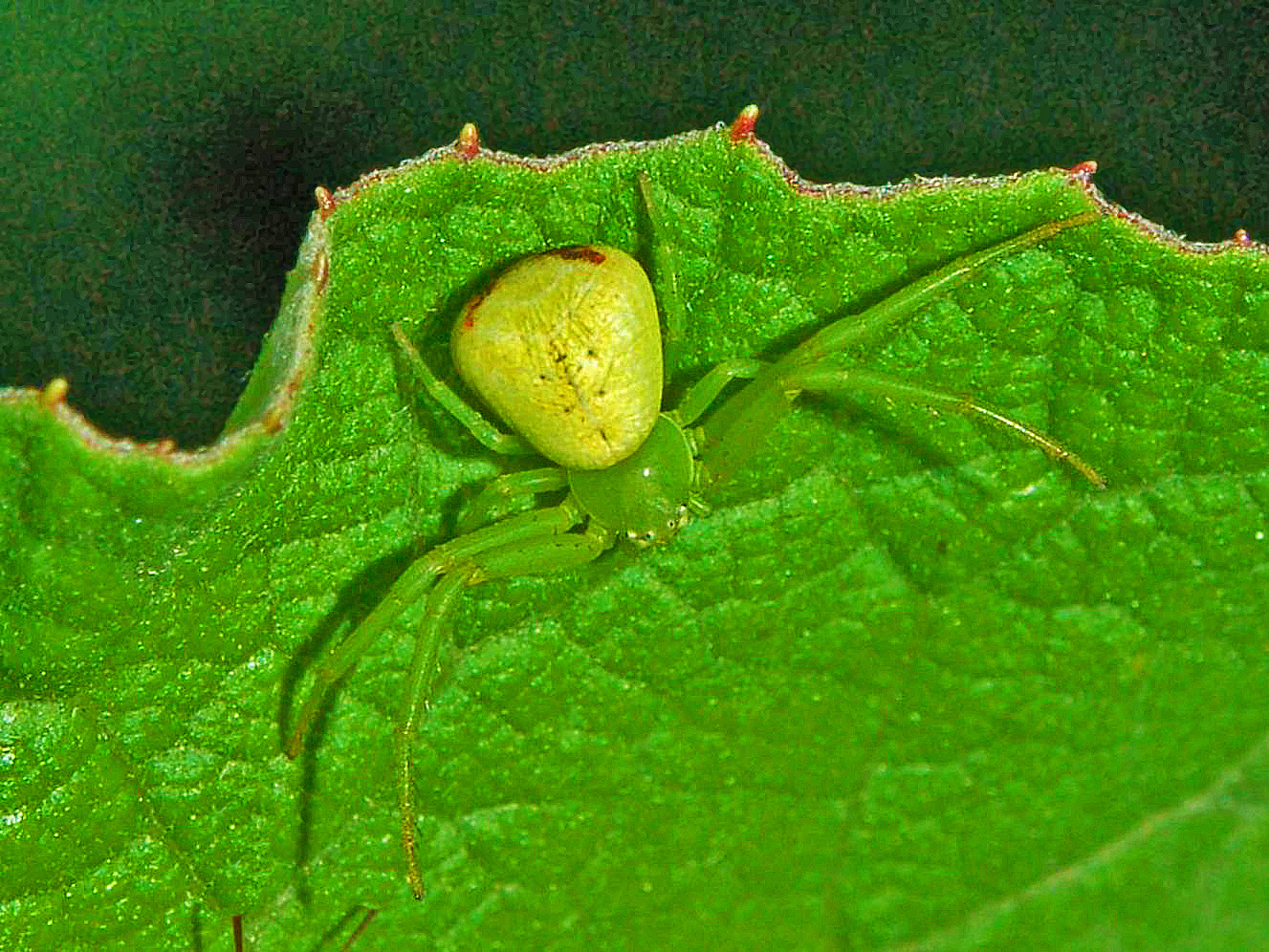
- Ebrechtella tricuspidata

Scientific classification
- Kingdom: Animalia
- Phylum: Arthropoda
- Subphylum: Chelicerata
- Class: Arachnida
- Order: Araneae
- Infraorder: Araneomorphae
- Family: Thomisidae
- Genus: Ebrechtella; Dahl, 1907

Type species
- E. concinna (Thorell, 1877)

Species
- 10, see text

= Ebrechtella =

Genus of spiders

Ebrechtella is a genus of crab spiders that was first described by Friedrich Dahl in 1907.

== Species ==
As of November 2022 it contains ten species and one subspecies, found in Asia and Europe:

- Ebrechtella concinna (Thorell, 1877) (type) – Pakistan to Philippines, Indonesia (Sulawesi), New Guinea
- Ebrechtella hongkong (Song, Zhu & Wu, 1997) – China
- Ebrechtella juwangensis Seo, 2015 – Korea
- Ebrechtella margaritacea (Simon, 1909) – Vietnam
- Ebrechtella pseudovatia (Schenkel, 1936) – Bhutan, China, Taiwan
- Ebrechtella sufflava (O. Pickard-Cambridge, 1885) – Pakistan
- Ebrechtella timida (Thorell, 1887) – Myanmar
- Ebrechtella tricuspidata (Fabricius, 1775) – Europe, Turkey, Caucasus, Russia (Europe to Far East), Kazakhstan, Iran, Central Asia, China, Korea, Japan
  - Ebrechtella t. concolor (Caporiacco, 1935) – Karakorum
- Ebrechtella xinjiangensis (Hu & Wu, 1989) – China
- Ebrechtella xinjie (Song, Zhu & Wu, 1997) – China

In synonymy:

- E. arciger (Grube, 1861) = Ebrechtella tricuspidata (Fabricius, 1775)
- E. dierythra (Thorell, 1892) = Ebrechtella concinna (Thorell, 1877)
- E. expallidata (O. Pickard-Cambridge, 1885) = Ebrechtella sufflava (O. Pickard-Cambridge, 1885)
- E. fruhstorferi Dahl, 1907 = Ebrechtella concinna (Thorell, 1877)
- E. gamma (Chrysanthus, 1964) = Ebrechtella concinna (Thorell, 1877)
- E. maygitgitus (Barrion & Litsinger, 1995) = Ebrechtella concinna (Thorell, 1877)
- E. pavesii (O. Pickard-Cambridge, 1873) = Ebrechtella tricuspidata (Fabricius, 1775)
- E. silveryi (Tikader, 1965) = Ebrechtella concinna (Thorell, 1877)
- E. subargentata (O. Pickard-Cambridge, 1885) = Ebrechtella concinna (Thorell, 1877)
- E. wenensis (Zhu, Song & Tang, 1995) = Ebrechtella pseudovatia (Schenkel, 1936)

== See also ==
- List of Thomisidae species
