= Misumena nigromaculata =

Conservation status
- Data Deficient (IUCN 3.1)

Scientific classification
- Kingdom: Animalia
- Phylum: Arthropoda
- Subphylum: Chelicerata
- Class: Arachnida
- Order: Araneae
- Infraorder: Araneomorphae
- Family: Thomisidae
- Genus: Misumena
- Species: M. nigromaculata

Binomial name
- Misumena nigromaculata (Denis, 1963)

Species of spider

Misumena nigromaculata is a species of spider endemic to Madeira. It was described by the French arachnologist Jacques Denis in 1963 based on a female specimen collected in 1940 from Funchal, Madeira. The female type specimen was 6 mm long, with a cephalothorax 3 mm long. It was described by Denis as being extremely similar to M. spinifera in appearance, differing only in having two large black spots on the lung-books and having the region between the spinnerets being black. The spider is endemic to Madeira, where the only confirmed record is from Funchal, while a more recent record from Dunas da Piedade, Ponta de São Lourenco is currently unconfirmed. Almost nothing is known of its range, population, population trends, and the threats facing the species.

== Taxonomy ==
Misumena nigromaculata was described by the French arachnologist Jacques Denis in 1963 based on a female specimen collected in 1940 from Funchal, Madeira. The type specimen was an adult female.

== Description ==
The female type specimen was 6 mm long, with a cephalothorax 3 mm long. It was described by Denis as being extremely similar to M. spinifera in appearance, differing only in having two large black spots on the lung-books and having the region between the spinnerets being black. The epigynes differ from those of spinifera in being much closer to the epigastric furrow. The metatarsi I and II have 8-8 lower spines, tibia I can have 11 to 13 pairs, and tibia II has 10 pairs. The tibial spines are unequal in size.

== Distribution and conservation ==
The spider is endemic to Madeira, where the only confirmed record is from Funchal, while a more recent record from Dunas da Piedade, Ponta de São Lourenco is currently unconfirmed. The type locality in Funchal was largely farms and gardens at the time of collection of the type specimen and is now a residential neighborhodd. The unconfirmed record from Dunas da Piedade is a semi-arid grassland. Other species in the genus Misumena are ambush hunters that hunt for prey on flowers.

Misumena nigromaculata is listed by the IUCN as being data-deficient as almost nothing is known of its range, population, population trends, and the threats facing the species. Excessive stone-stacking in tourist areas in Madeira may be detrimental to the spider.
