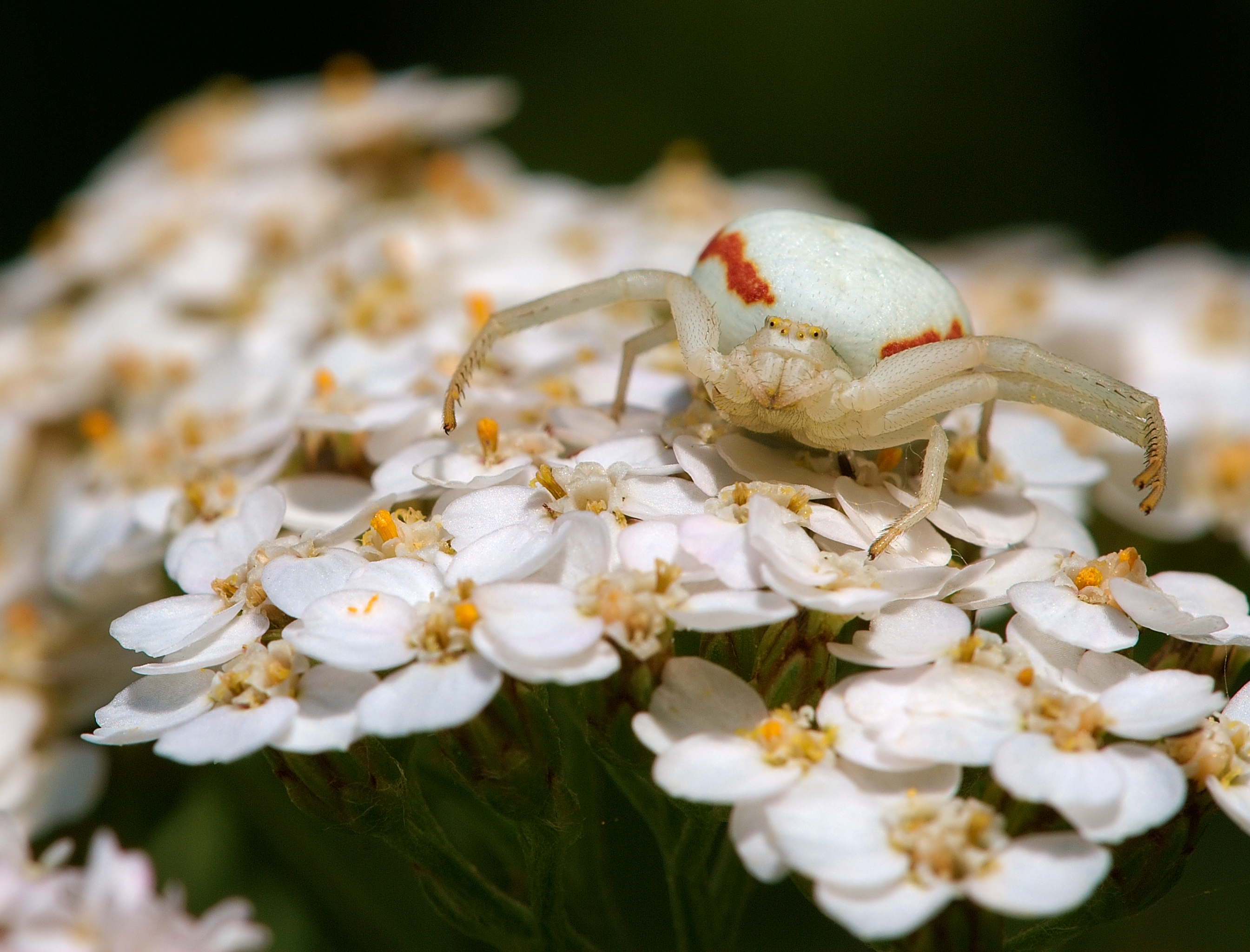
- Misumena vatia female

Scientific classification
- Domain: Eukaryota
- Kingdom: Animalia
- Phylum: Arthropoda
- Subphylum: Chelicerata
- Class: Arachnida
- Order: Araneae
- Infraorder: Araneomorphae
- Family: Thomisidae
- Genus: Misumena; Latreille, 1804

= Misumena =

Misumena Temporal range: Palaeogene–present

Genus of spiders

Misumena is a genus of crab spiders sometimes referred to as flower crab spiders. They are similar in appearance to several other genera in the family Thomisidae, such as Misumenoides and Mecaphesa.

Misumena vatia, the goldenrod crab spider, is a North American species commonly seen hunting in goldenrod (Solidago) sprays in autumn. It can change its color between white and yellow to match the flower it is sitting on. The color change takes a few days.

== Species ==
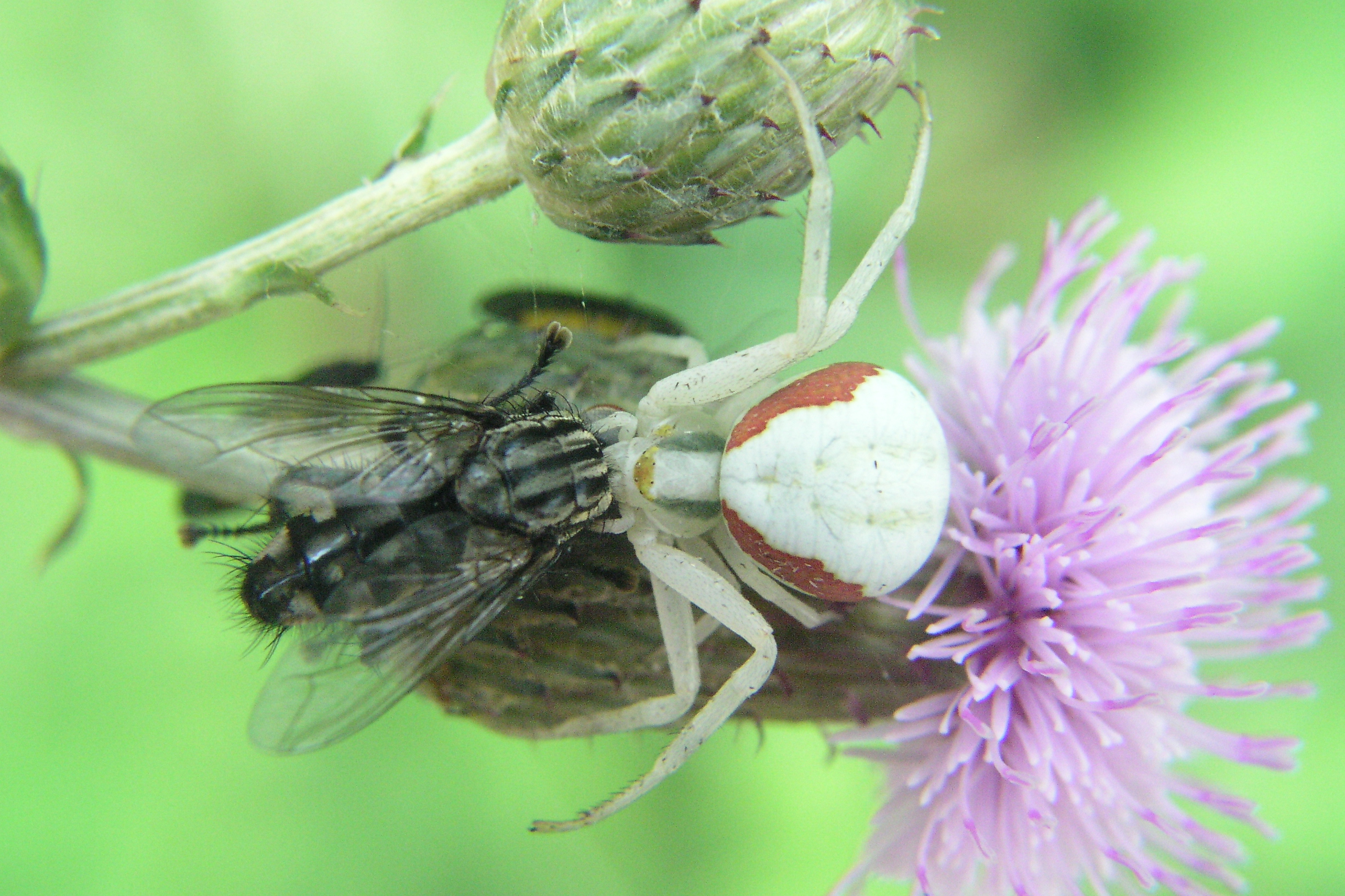
Misumena vatia with fly

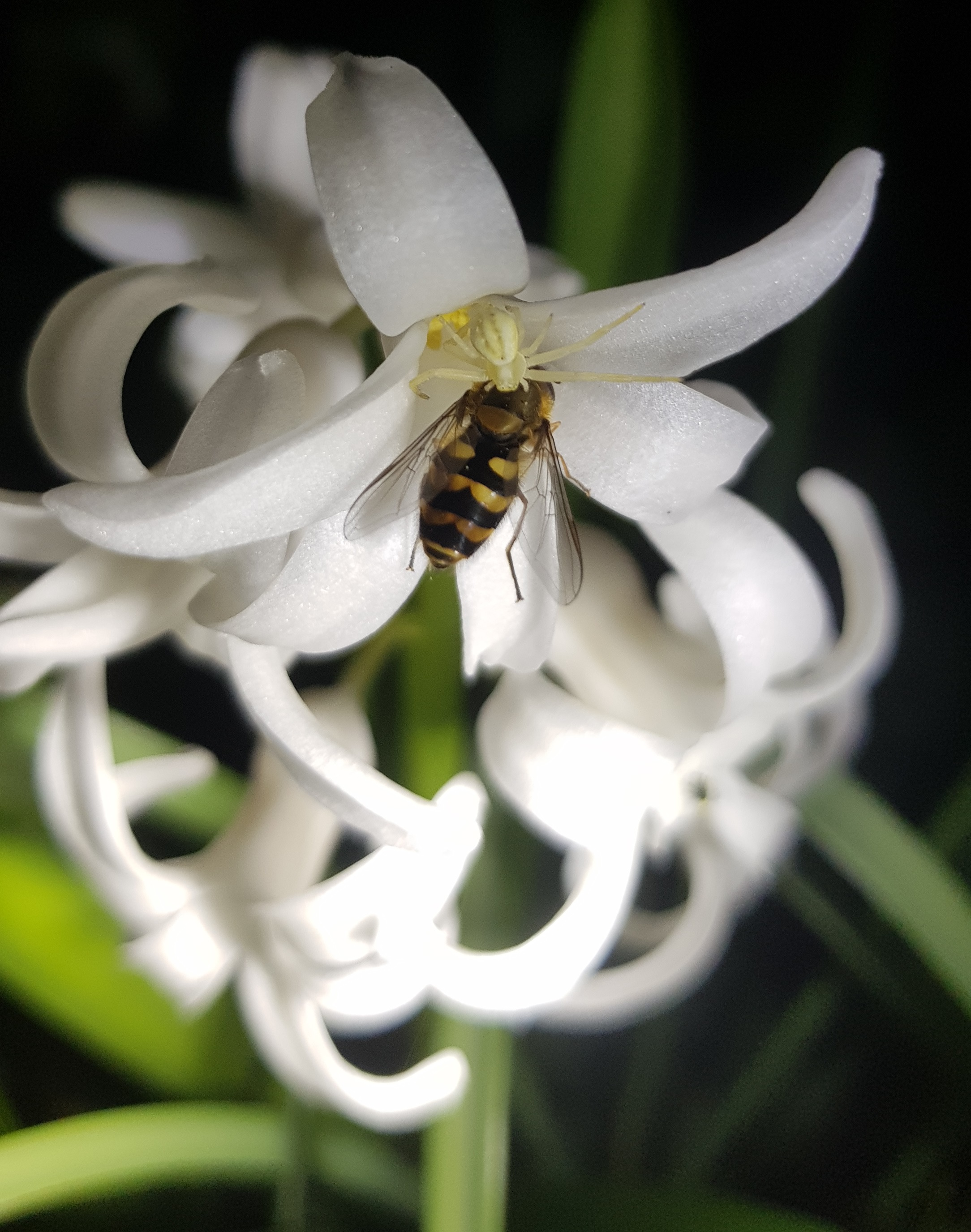
Misumena with hoverfly on Hyacinthus

As of 2022, the World Spider Catalog listed the following 40 species:

- Misumena adelae Mello-Leitão, 1944 – Argentina
- Misumena alpha Chrysanthus, 1964 – New Guinea
- Misumena amabilis Keyserling, 1880 – Peru
- Misumena annapurna Tikader, 1963 – India
- Misumena arrogans Thorell, 1881 – Yule Island
- Misumena atrocincta Costa, 1875 – Egypt
- Misumena beta Chrysanthus, 1964 – New Guinea
- Misumena bicolor Simon, 1875 – Corsica
- Misumena bipunctata Rainbow, 1898 – Australia
- Misumena citreoides (Taczanowski, 1872) – Guyana, French Guiana
- Misumena conferta Banks, 1898 – Mexico
- Misumena fasciata Kulczynski, 1911 – New Guinea
- Misumena fidelis Banks, 1898 – United States, Mexico
- Misumena frenata Simon, 1909 – Vietnam
- Misumena ganpatii Kumari & Mittal, 1994 – India
- Misumena greenae Tikader, 1965 – India
- Misumena grubei (Simon, 1895) – Mongolia, China
- Misumena indra Tikader, 1963 – India
- Misumena innotata Thorell, 1881 – New Guinea
- Misumena lorentzi Kulczynski, 1911 – New Guinea
- Misumena luteovariata Mello-Leitão, 1929 – Brazil
- Misumena maputiyana Barrion & Litsinger, 1995 – Philippines
- Misumena maronica Caporiacco, 1954 – French Guiana
- Misumena mickeyi (Sen, Saha & Raychaudhuri, 2012) – India
- Misumena mridulai Tikader, 1962 – India
- Misumena nana Lessert, 1933 – Angola
- Misumena nigripes (Taczanowski, 1872) – Peru, French Guiana
- Misumena nigromaculata Denis, 1963 – Madeira
- Misumena oblonga O. P.-Cambridge, 1885 – Yarkand
- Misumena pallescens Caporiacco, 1949 – Kenya
- Misumena peninsulana Banks, 1898 – Mexico
- Misumena platimanu Mello-Leitão, 1929 – Brazil
- Misumena ritujae (Gajbe, 2008) – India
- Misumena rubripes Keyserling, 1880 – Peru
- Misumena spinifera (Blackwall, 1862) – Madeira, Canary Islands
- Misumena spinigaster Mello-Leitão, 1929 – Brazil
- Misumena tapyasuka Barrion & Litsinger, 1995 – Java
- Misumena terrosa Soares, 1944 – Brazil
- Misumena vatia (Clerck, 1757) – Holarctic
- Misumena viridans Mello-Leitão, 1917 – Brazil
