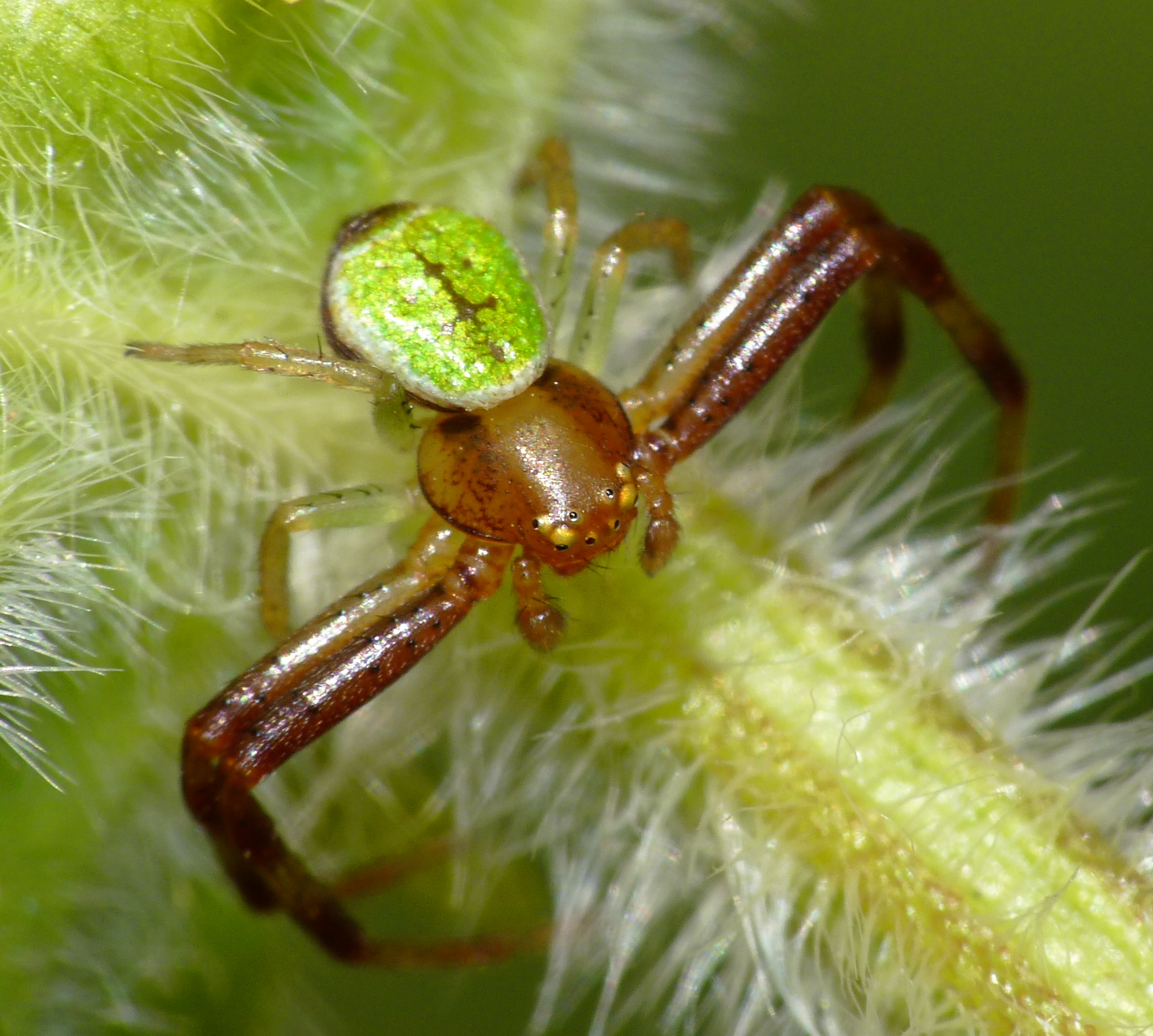
- Ebrechtella tricuspidata. Male
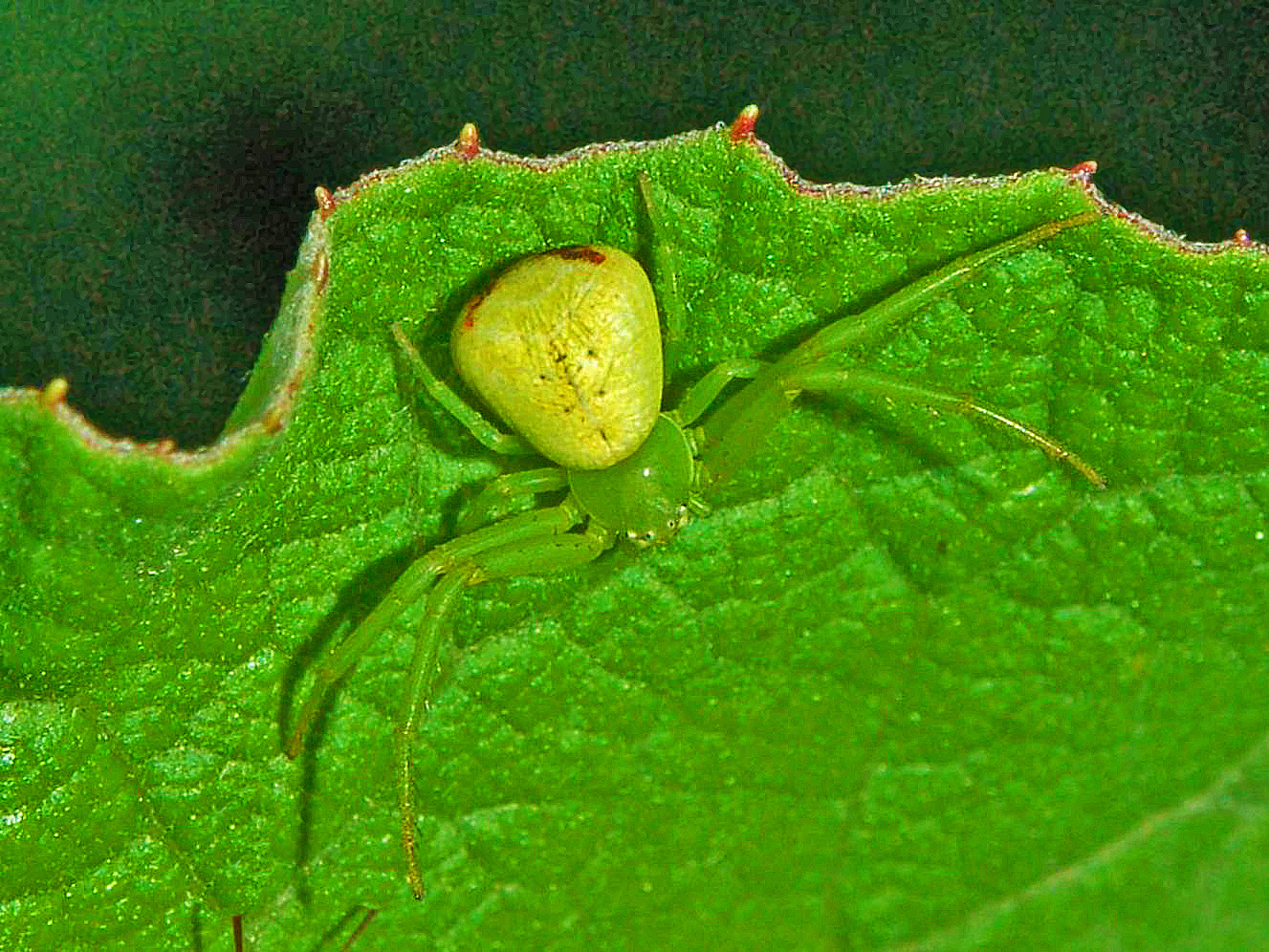
- Female

Scientific classification
- Domain: Eukaryota
- Kingdom: Animalia
- Phylum: Arthropoda
- Subphylum: Chelicerata
- Class: Arachnida
- Order: Araneae
- Infraorder: Araneomorphae
- Family: Thomisidae
- Genus: Ebrechtella
- Species: E. tricuspidata

Binomial name
- Ebrechtella tricuspidata (Fabricius, 1775)

Synonyms
- List: Aranea tricuspidata Fabricius, 1775; Aranea viatica Fourcroy, 1785; Aranea inaurata Olivier, 1789; Aranea delicatula Walckenaer, 1802; Aranea diana Walckenaer, 1802; Thomisus hermanii Hahn, 1833; Thomisus arcigerus Grube, 1861; Diana delicata Simon, 1864; Xysticus pavesii O. Pickard-Cambridge, 1873

= Ebrechtella tricuspidata =

Species of spider

Ebrechtella tricuspidata is a species of crab spiders belonging to the family Thomisidae.

== Subspecies ==
Subspecies include:

- Ebrechtella tricuspidata tricuspidata (Fabricius, 1775) - Palearctic realm
- Ebrechtella tricuspidata concolor (Caporiacco, 1935) - Karakorum

== Distribution ==
This species is widespread in the Palearctic realm (Europe, Turkey, Caucasus, Russia to Central Asia, China, Korea, and Japan). It is not found in Great Britain.

== Habitat ==
These medium-sized crab spiders inhabit dry meadows and sunny forest edges, waiting for prey well camouflaged in flower and foliage.

== Description ==
Ebrechtella tricuspidata can reach approximately a body length of 5–6 millimetres (0.20–0.24 in) in females, while males are smaller, reaching a body length of 2.5–3.5 millimetres (0.098–0.138 in). The cephalothorax (Prosoma) is light green in females, with sometimes indeterminate reddish markings on the back of the whitish-yellowish abdomen. These reddish markings usually consist of two broad rear-connected bands. Also legs are light green.

Males are clearly different-looking (sexual dimorphism). They have light brown cephalothorax with bright median stripe and the first two pairs of legs, while the bottle-shaped abdomen (Opisthosoma) is usually pale green, laterally with dark brown markings.

== Biology ==
Adults from both sexes can be found in May and June.

== Gallery ==
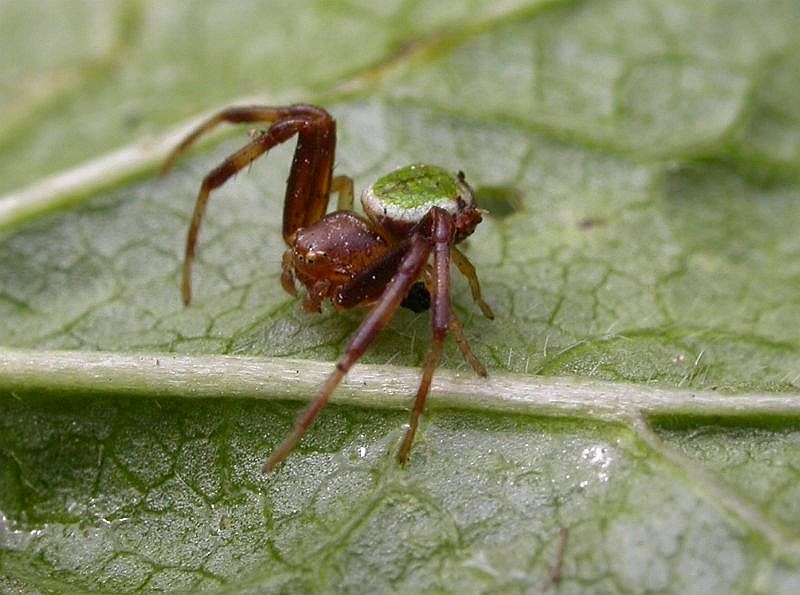
Male, side view

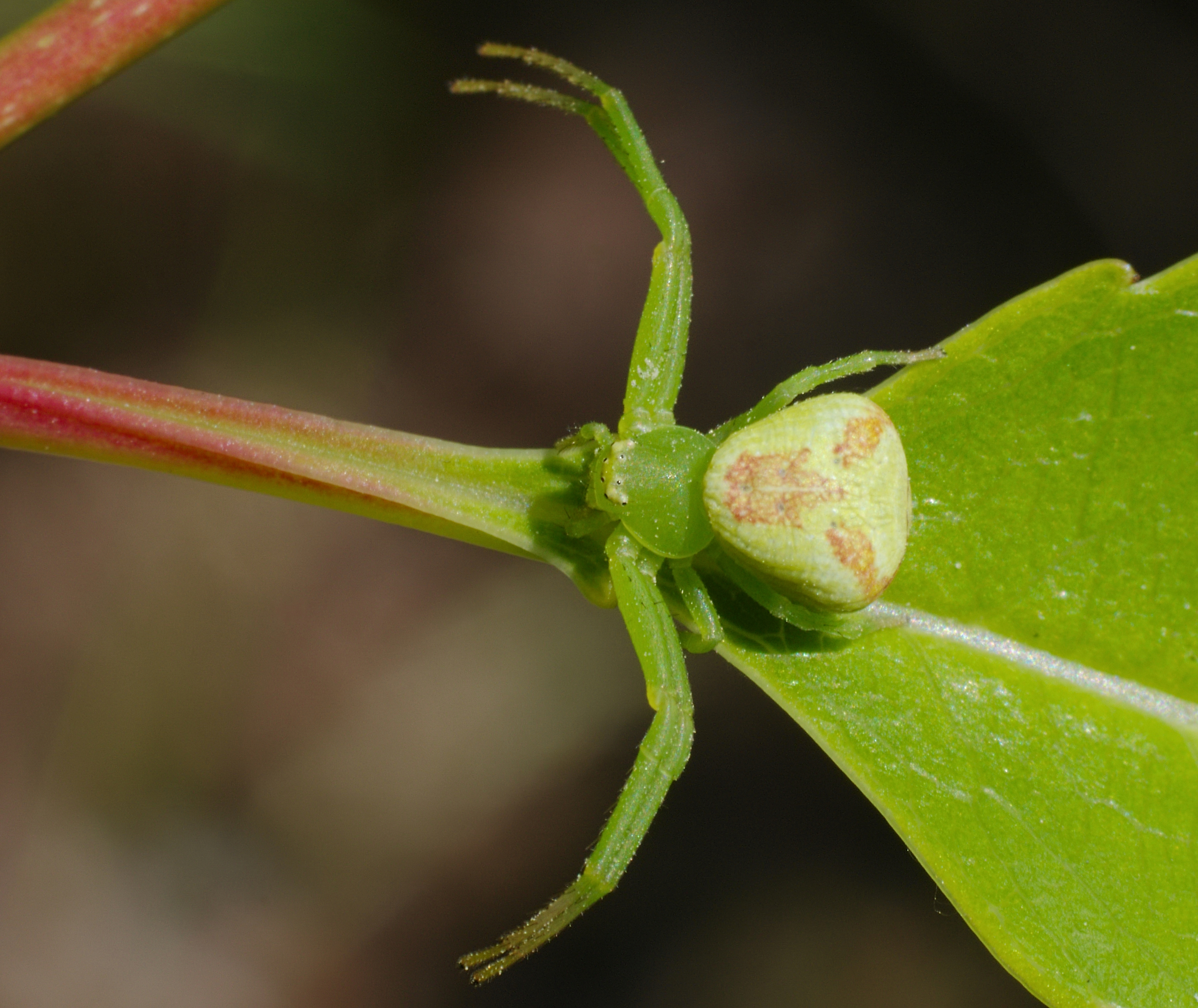
Female, dorsal view

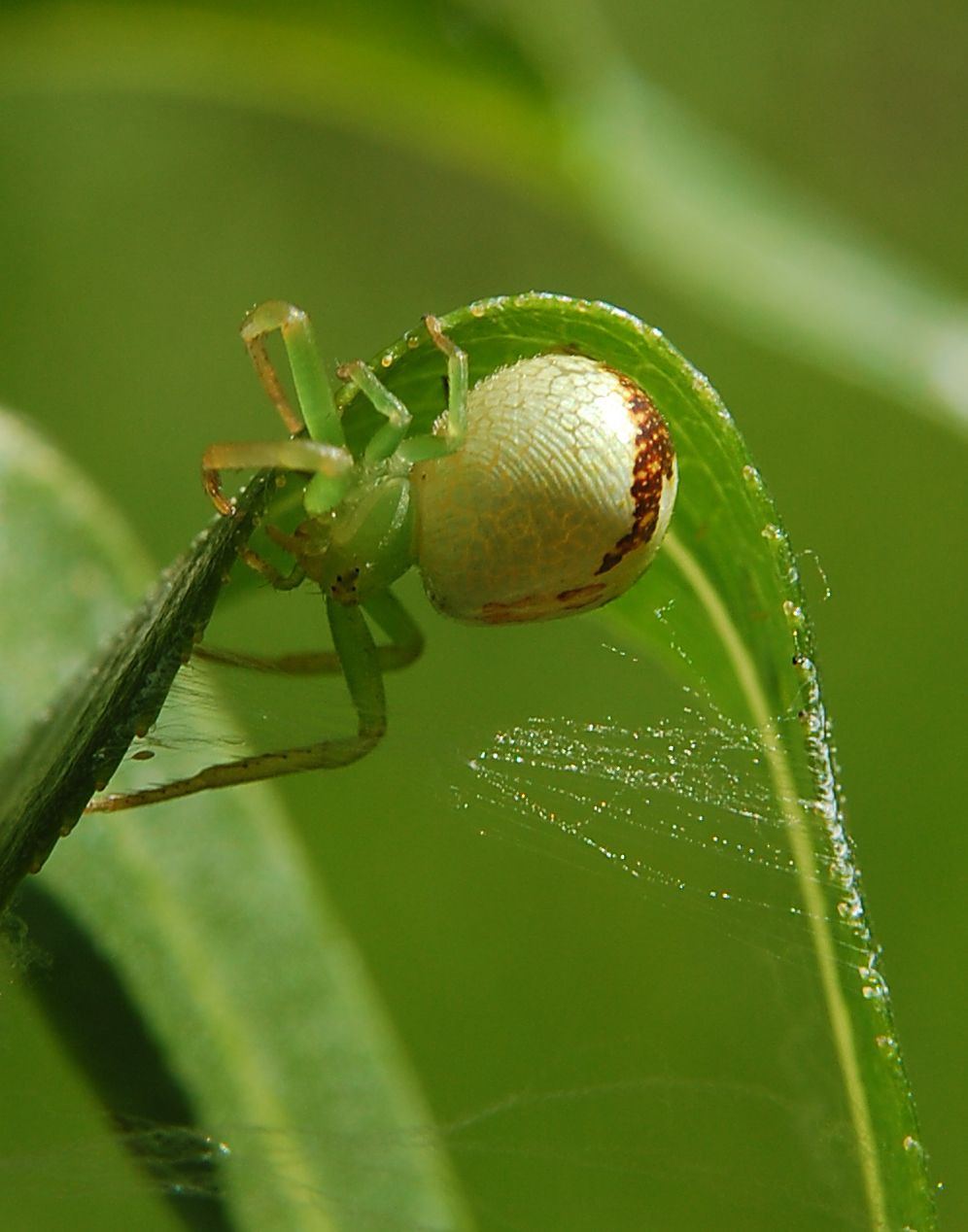
Female, preparing a leaf for egglaying

Female, catching a fly
