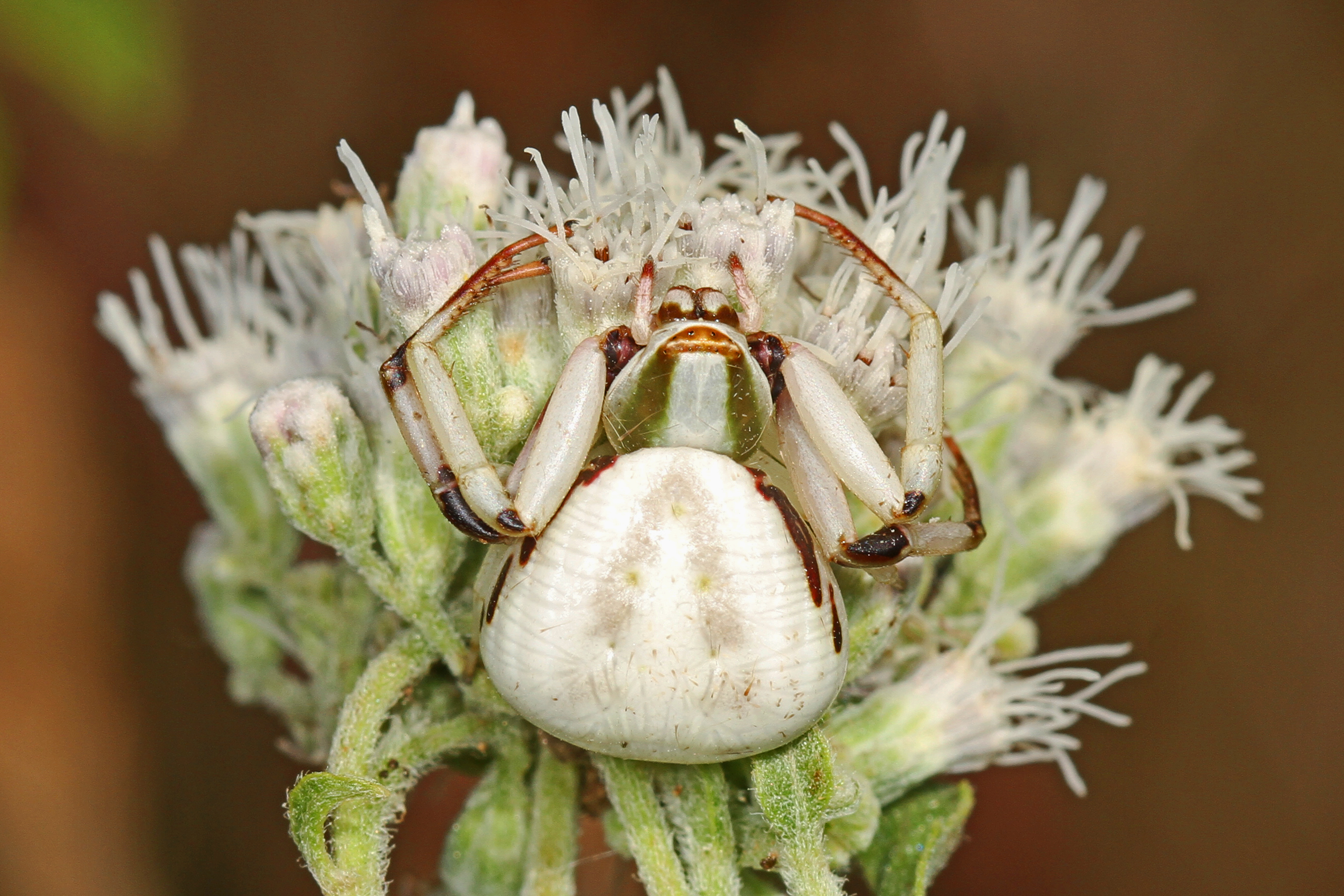
- Female
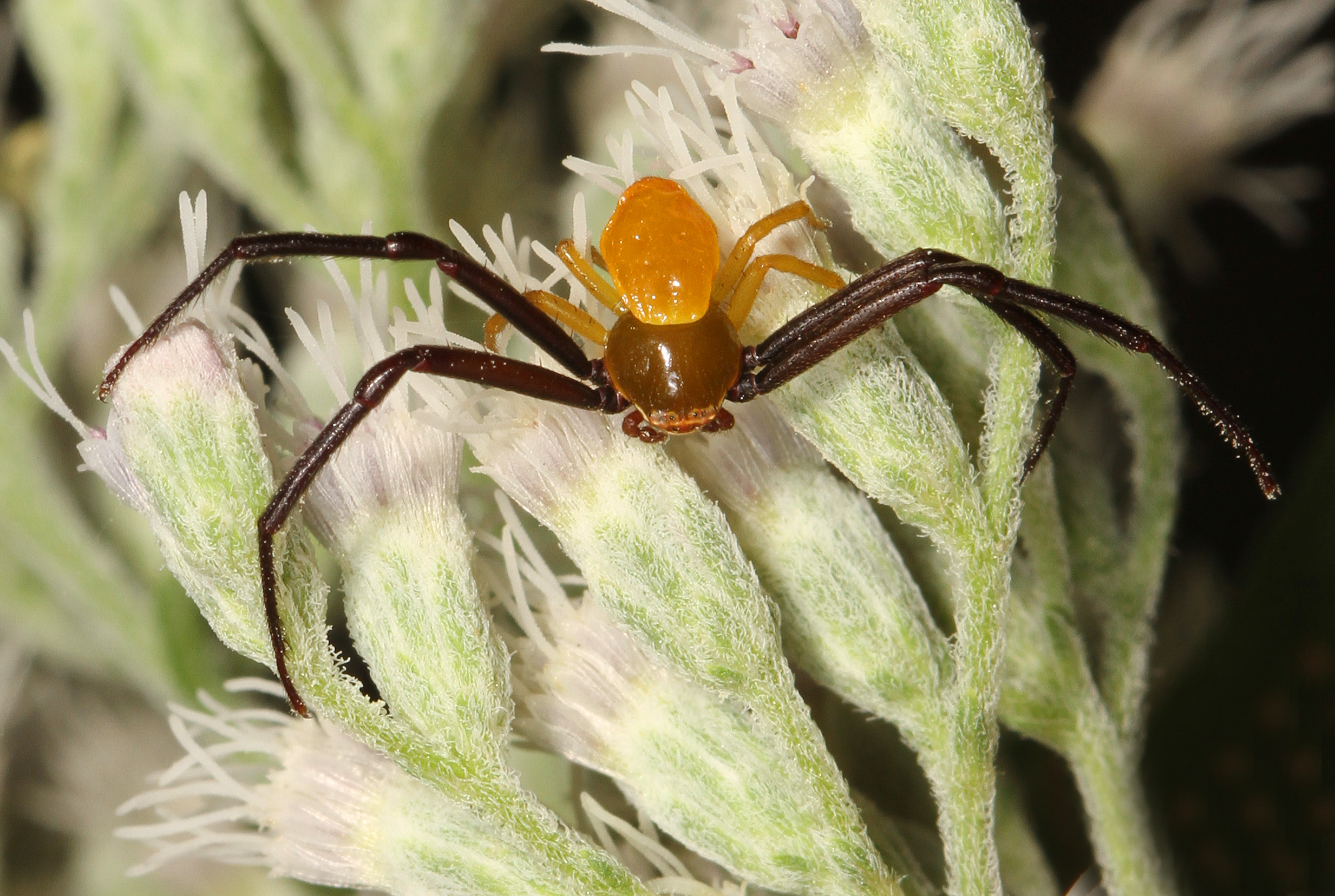
- Male

Scientific classification
- Kingdom: Animalia
- Phylum: Arthropoda
- Subphylum: Chelicerata
- Class: Arachnida
- Order: Araneae
- Infraorder: Araneomorphae
- Family: Thomisidae
- Genus: Misumenoides
- Species: M. formosipes

Binomial name
- Misumenoides formosipes (Walckenaer, 1837)

= Misumenoides formosipes =

Species of spider

Misumenoides formosipes is a species of crab spiders (Thomisidae), belonging to the genus Misumenoides ("crab" or "flower" spiders). The species' unofficial common name is white banded crab spider, which refers to a white line that runs through the plane of their eyes. This species is a sit-and-wait predator that captures pollinators as they visit the inflorescences on which the spider sits. The spider has strong front legs which are used to seize prey. The female spider is much larger than the male. The pattern of markings on females is variable and the overall color of the body can change between white and yellow dependent on the color of their surroundings. The color pattern for males, which does not change in their lifetime, differs from females in that the four front legs of males are darker and the abdomen is gold. The spider can be found throughout the United States and Colombia (Copacabana- Antioquia) . Males search for sedentary females within a heterogeneous habitat and guard them until they are sexually mature to reproduce.

== Physiology ==
White banded crab spiders are differentiated from other similar species by the presence of the white ridge below the bottom row of eyes. They get the name crab spider because of their resemblance to crabs in their shape and front legs.

=== Females ===
Female M. formosipes have a length of 5.0–11.3 millimetres (0.20–0.44 in). They can change their coloring to appear as white, yellow, or light brown and can have various markings along their body that are red, black, or brown. Their posterior is a rounded triangular shape.

=== Males ===
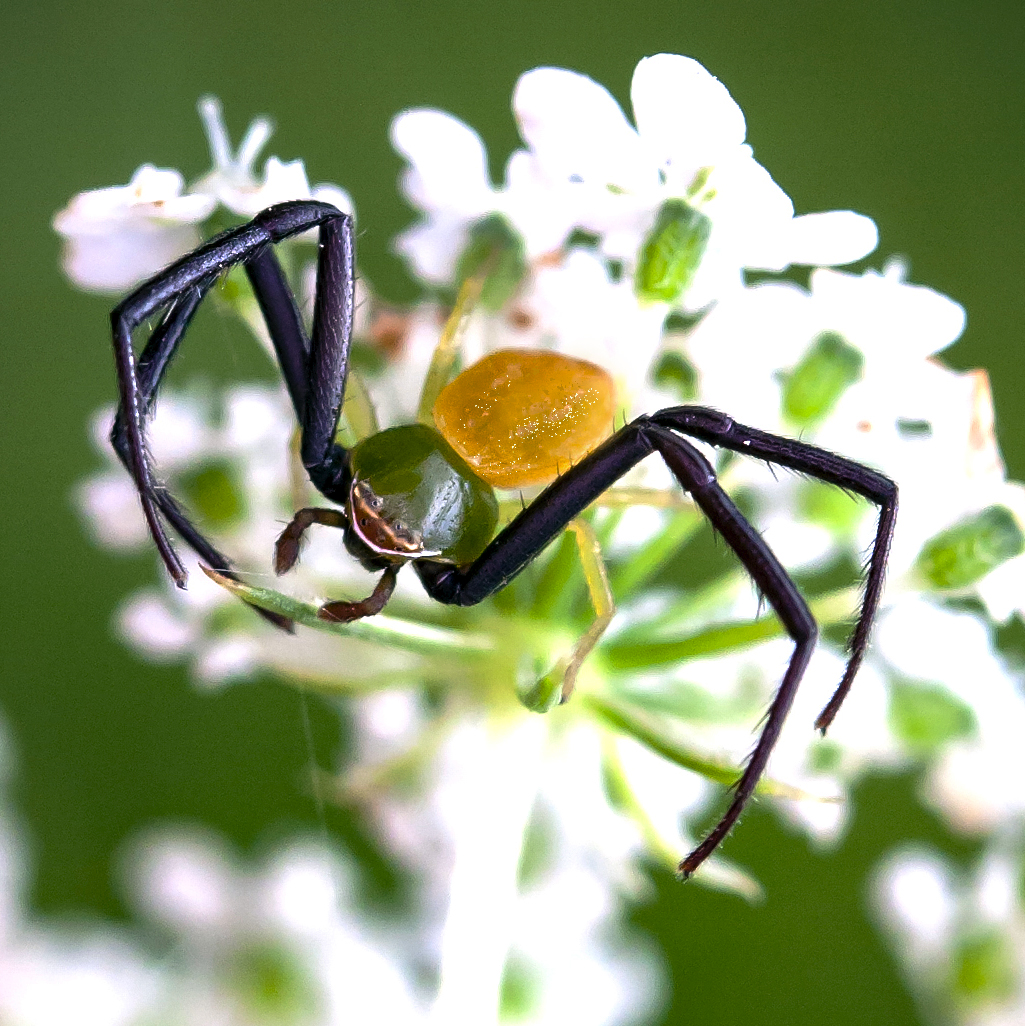
Misumenoides formosipes - male

Male M. formosipes are much smaller than the females and only have a length of 2.5–3.2 mm (0.10–0.13 in). Their front legs are a much longer and a darker color than their back legs. The abdomen is a gold color that cannot be changed, unlike the female.

== Behavior ==
=== Floral attraction ===
M. formosipes is a non-web building spider, so they use flowers to catch pollinators as well as find mates. Males spend a majority of their time searching for mates, primarily females close to adulthood, so they search for inflorescences by the smell they give off. A common flower that M. formosipes is attracted to is the Rudbeckia hirta. Males tend to feed on the nectar of flowers, specifically Daucus carota.

=== Color-changing ability ===
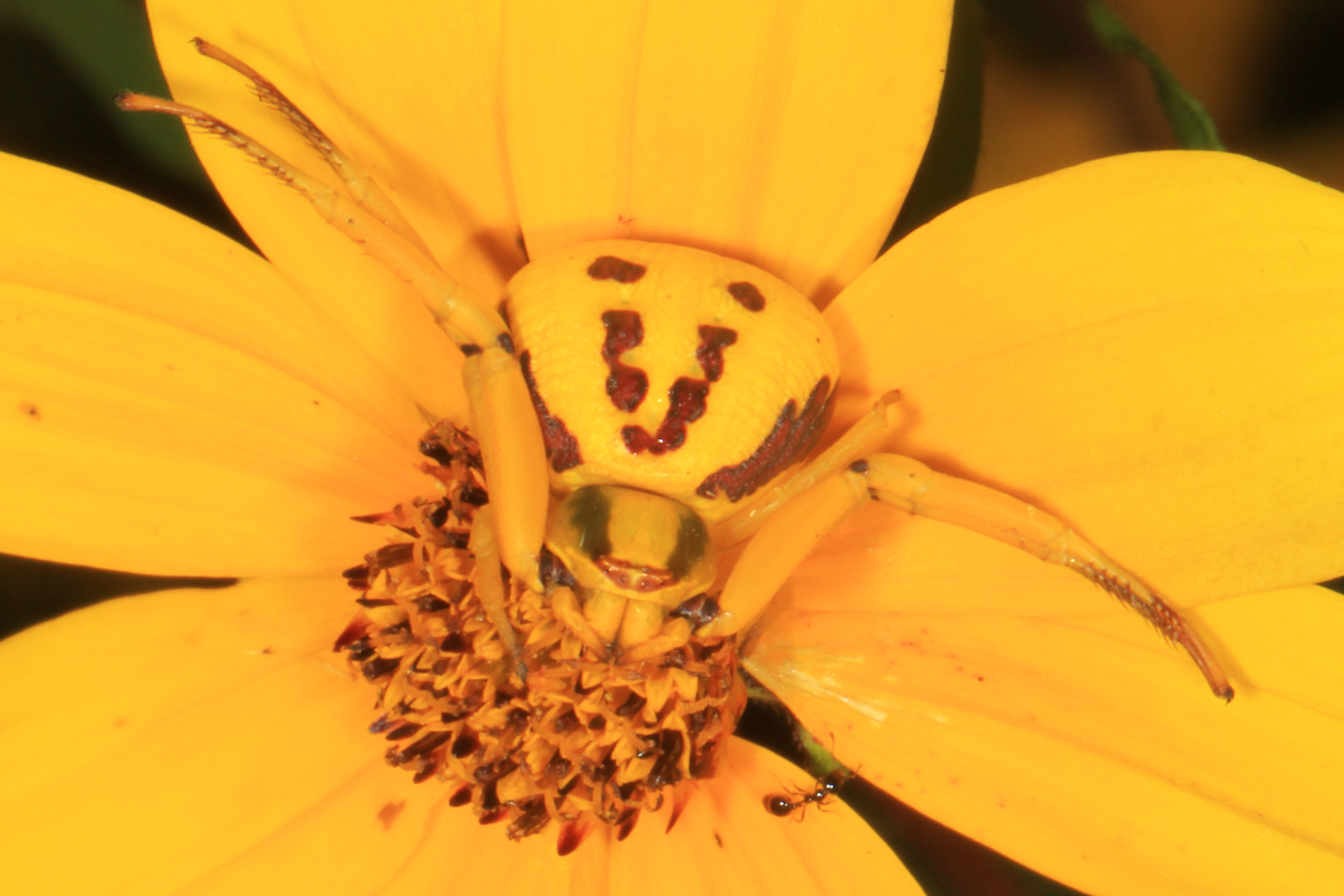
Female M. formosipes with yellow pigmentation to camouflage on a yellow flower.

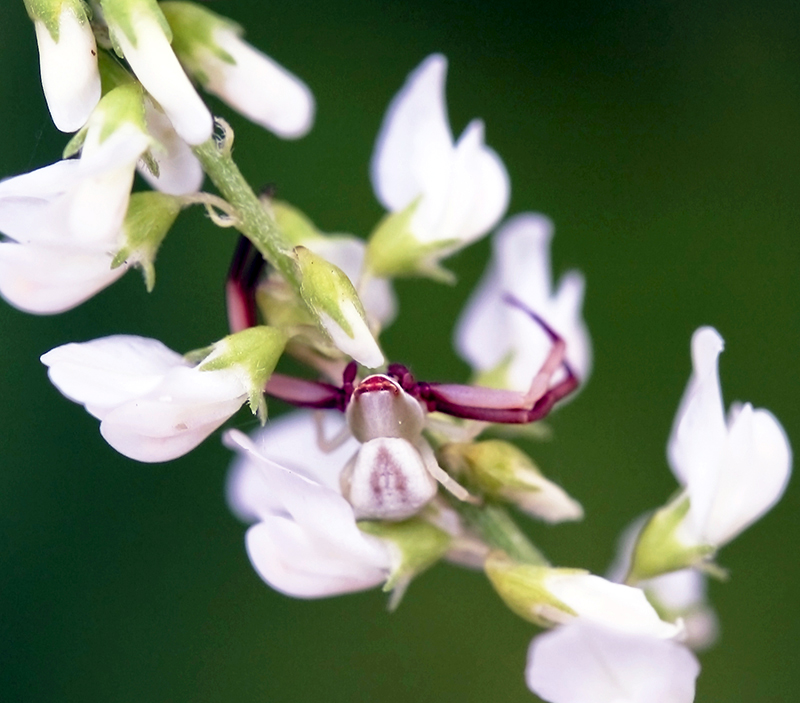
Female Whitebanded Crab Spider (Misumenoides formosipes) on a white flower

Female M. formosipes are able to change their color between yellow and white to better match the flower they are occupying. The change from white to yellow can take over 3 days, while the change from yellow to white takes longer. The yellow coloring is due to ommochrome pigments being produced. The appearance of white is due to guanine and uric acid in the epidermis.

== Hunting and diet ==
Female M. formosipes hunt by waiting on inflorescences and capturing pollinators that visit the flower. Male M. formosipes are nectarivores and get a majority of their nutrients from consuming nectar from Daucus carota, commonly known as Queen Anne's Lace. Since the male M. formosipes are significantly smaller than the females, they are able to benefit from the low amounts of sucrose found in nectar.

== Reproduction and lifecycle ==
=== Egg laying ===
The female crab spider will deposit their eggs into a silk sack roughly 10-14mm wide on nearby foliage. There will be around 80 to 180 tan colored eggs wrapped in the silk. The female will then guard the sack until she dies.

=== Activity ===
M. formosipes diurnal, so it is active during the day. They have a very high temperature tolerance and are able to withstand temperatures up to 48.2 °C (118.76 °F) and down to 2.2 °C (35.96 °F). They prefer temperatures around 18.4 °C (65.12 °F).

=== Sexual dimorphism ===
The sexual dimorphism of the white banded crab spider has resulted in significantly smaller males from females. Females can grow to be around 5.0-11.3 millimeters (0.20-0.44 inches) and males can grow to be 2.5-3.2 mm (0.10-0.13 in). Since the males are actively searching for females, this smaller size is beneficial for both traveling and survival. Males will travel by jumping from one plant part to another as well as traversing across a string of silk they throw into the wind that stick to an object. Their smaller size also helps them stay hidden from predators.

=== Pre-copulatory mate guarding ===
Male M. formosipes spend a significant amount of time searching for unmated penultimate females. Once a mate has been found, the male will then live on the female's inflorescence and fight off any intruding males. Virgin female M. formosipes will not resist mating attempts, so the male that is closest once the female molts into maturity will have a mating advantage. When two males of equal size fight, the resident spider will win a majority of the time over the intruder male. Males that also have previous experience at winning fights will have a much greater advantage.

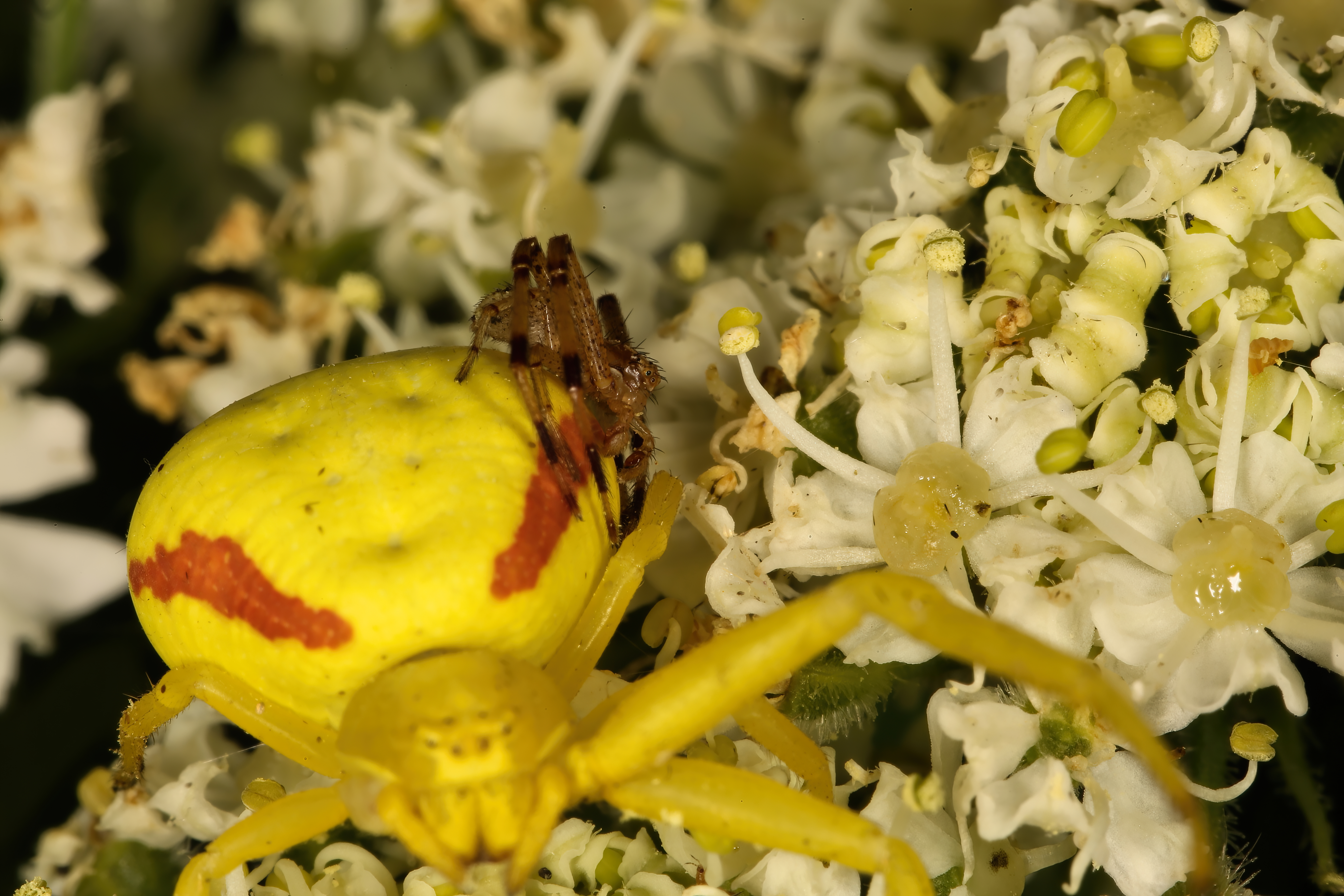
Female & Male White Banded Crab Spider on flower in Point Reyes National Seashore
