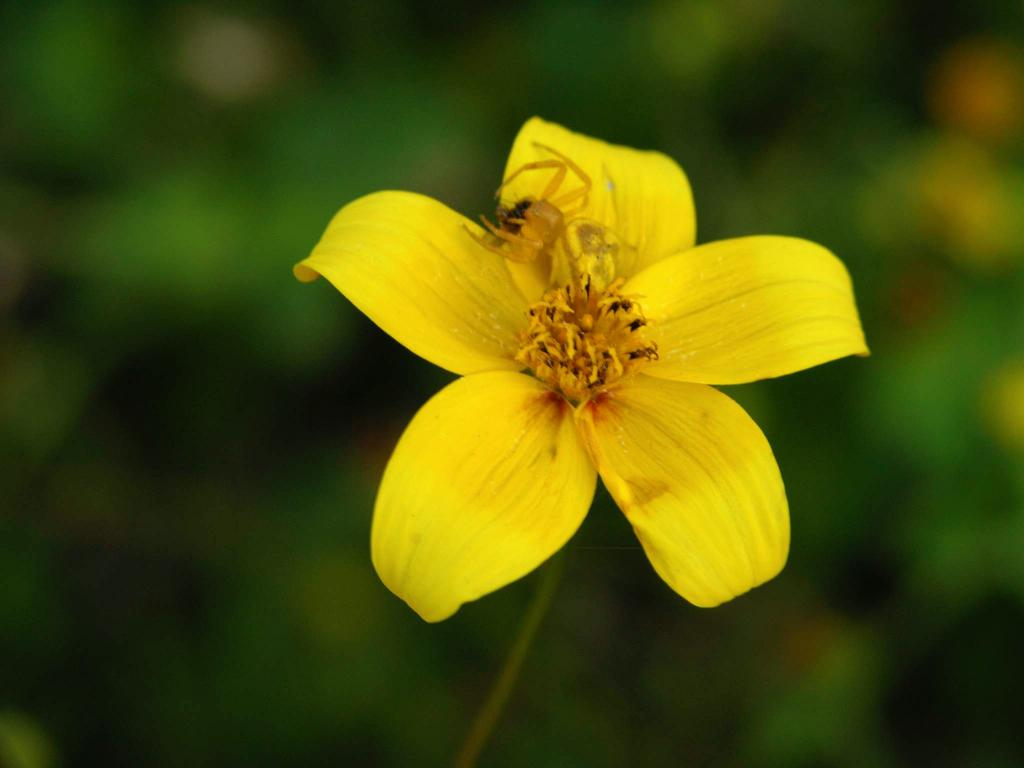
- Possibly Misumenoides parvus, on the Bidens ferulifolia

Scientific classification
- Domain: Eukaryota
- Kingdom: Animalia
- Phylum: Arthropoda
- Subphylum: Chelicerata
- Class: Arachnida
- Order: Araneae
- Infraorder: Araneomorphae
- Family: Thomisidae
- Genus: Misumenoides; F. O. P-Cambridge, 1900

= Misumenoides =

Genus of spiders

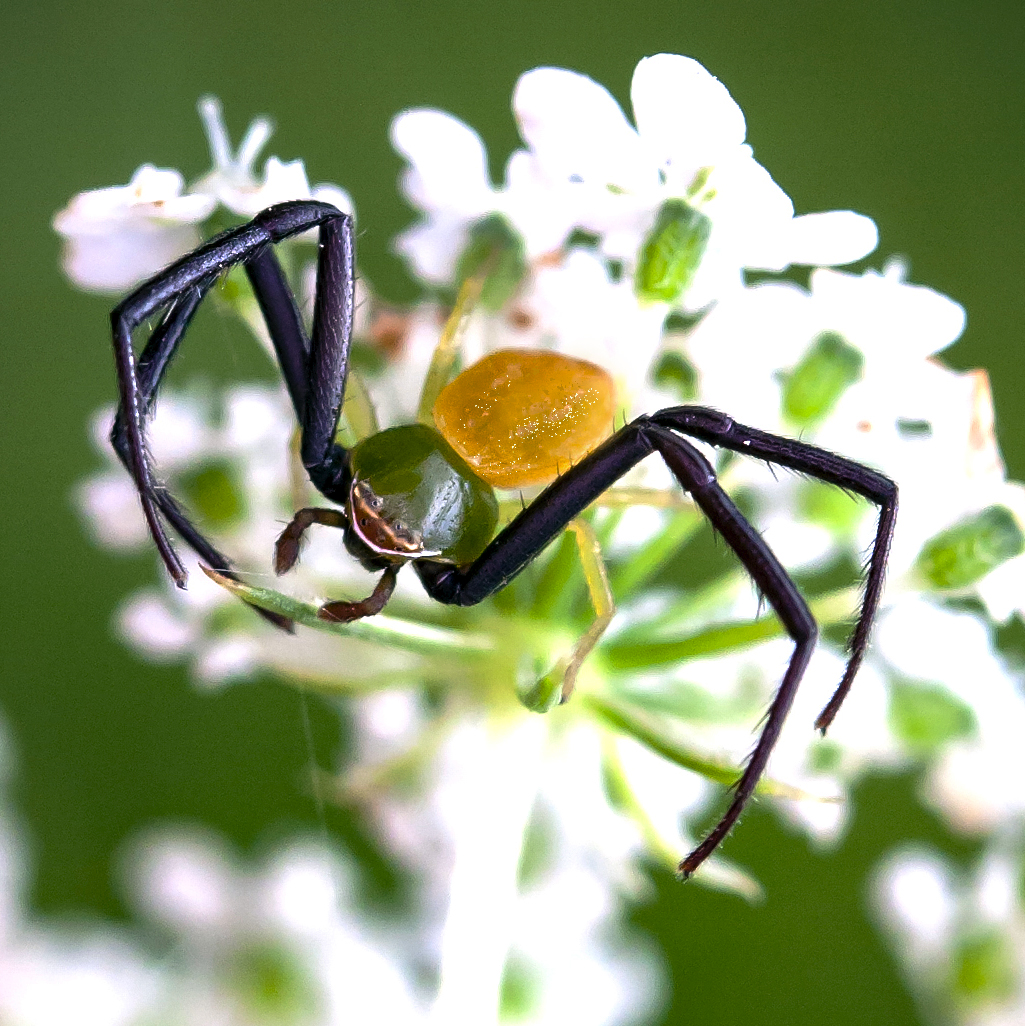
Male Misumenoides formosipes (whitebanded crab spider)

Misumenoides is a genus of spiders in the family Thomisidae. Spiders in this family are commonly called "crab" or "flower" spiders.

== Species ==
As of 2022, the World Spider Catalog listed the following 35 species:

- Misumenoides annulipes (O. P.-Cambridge, 1891) – Mexico, Guatemala
- Misumenoides athleticus (Mello-Leitão, 1944) – Mexico, Brazil
- Misumenoides bifissus F. O. P.-Cambridge, 1900 – Guatemala
- Misumenoides blandus (O. P.-Cambridge, 1891) – Guatemala, Panama
- Misumenoides carminatus Mello-Leitão, 1941 – Argentina
- Misumenoides chlorophilus (Holmberg, 1881) – Argentina
- Misumenoides corticatus Mello-Leitão, 1929 – Brazil
- Misumenoides crassipes (Keyserling, 1880) – Colombia
- Misumenoides dasysternon Mello-Leitão, 1943 – Chile
- Misumenoides decipiens Caporiacco, 1955 – Venezuela
- Misumenoides depressus (O. P.-Cambridge, 1891) – Guatemala
- Misumenoides eximius Mello-Leitão, 1938 – Argentina
- Misumenoides formosipes (Walckenaer, 1837) – Canada, United States
- Misumenoides fusciventris Mello-Leitão, 1929 – Brazil
- Misumenoides gerschmanae Mello-Leitão, 1944 – Argentina
- Misumenoides illotus Soares, 1944 – Brazil
- Misumenoides magnus (Keyserling, 1880) – Mexico to Colombia
- Misumenoides nicoleti Roewer, 1951 – Chile
- Misumenoides nigripes Mello-Leitão, 1929 – Brazil
- Misumenoides nigromaculatus (Keyserling, 1880) – Brazil
- Misumenoides obesulus (Gertsch & Davis, 1940) – Mexico
- Misumenoides parvus (Keyserling, 1880) – Mexico to Colombia
- Misumenoides paucispinosus Mello-Leitão, 1929 – Brazil, Guyana
- Misumenoides proseni Mello-Leitão, 1944 – Argentina
- Misumenoides quetzaltocatl Jiménez, 1992 – Mexico
- Misumenoides roseiceps Mello-Leitão, 1949 – Brazil
- Misumenoides rubrithorax Caporiacco, 1947 – Guyana
- Misumenoides rubroniger Mello-Leitão, 1947 – Brazil
- Misumenoides rugosus (O. P.-Cambridge, 1891) – Guatemala, Panama
- Misumenoides similis (Keyserling, 1881) – Brazil
- Misumenoides tibialis (O. P.-Cambridge, 1891) – Panama, Brazil
- Misumenoides variegatus Mello-Leitão, 1941 – Argentina
- Misumenoides vigilans (O. P.-Cambridge, 1890) – Guatemala
- Misumenoides vulneratus Mello-Leitão, 1929 – Brazil

The female Misumenoides formosipes, while similar to Misumena vatia, is not as large, and can be distinguished by the inverted 'V' marking on its back (with the point of the V closer to the cephalothorax) and the 'mask' over its eyes. In most respects this spider behaves like the goldenrod spider, also commonly hunting in goldenrod sprays in the fall. It tends to take smaller prey, however, avoiding the bumblebees and large butterflies in favor of honeybees, large flies and small butterflies such as skippers. Male M. formosipes are quite distinctive, being much smaller than females and having a greenish cephalothorax, yellow-orange abdomen, and long, red to reddish-black front legs. They are found on a wide variety of plants as they wander in search of females in late summer and early fall.
