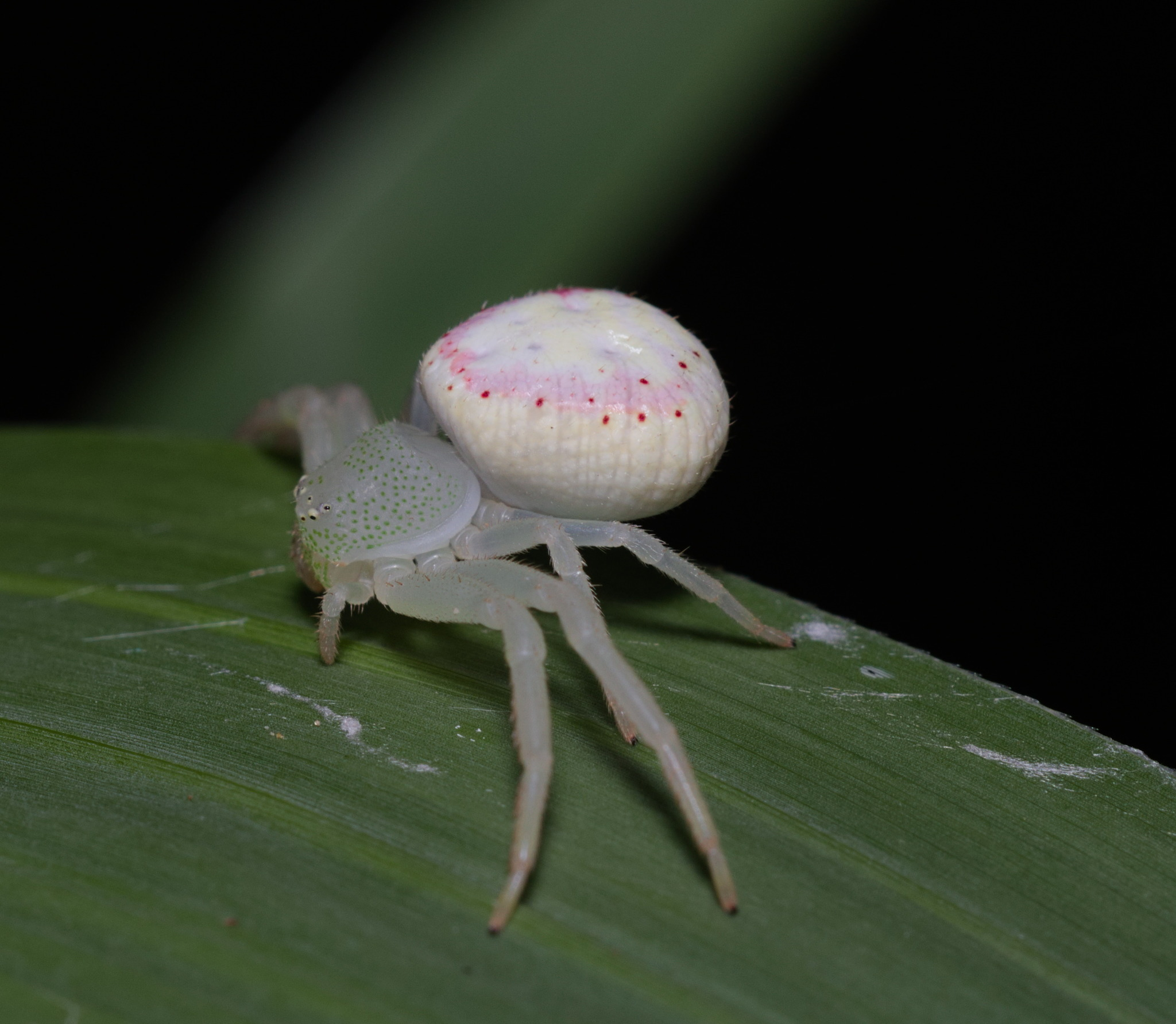
- female from Hong Kong
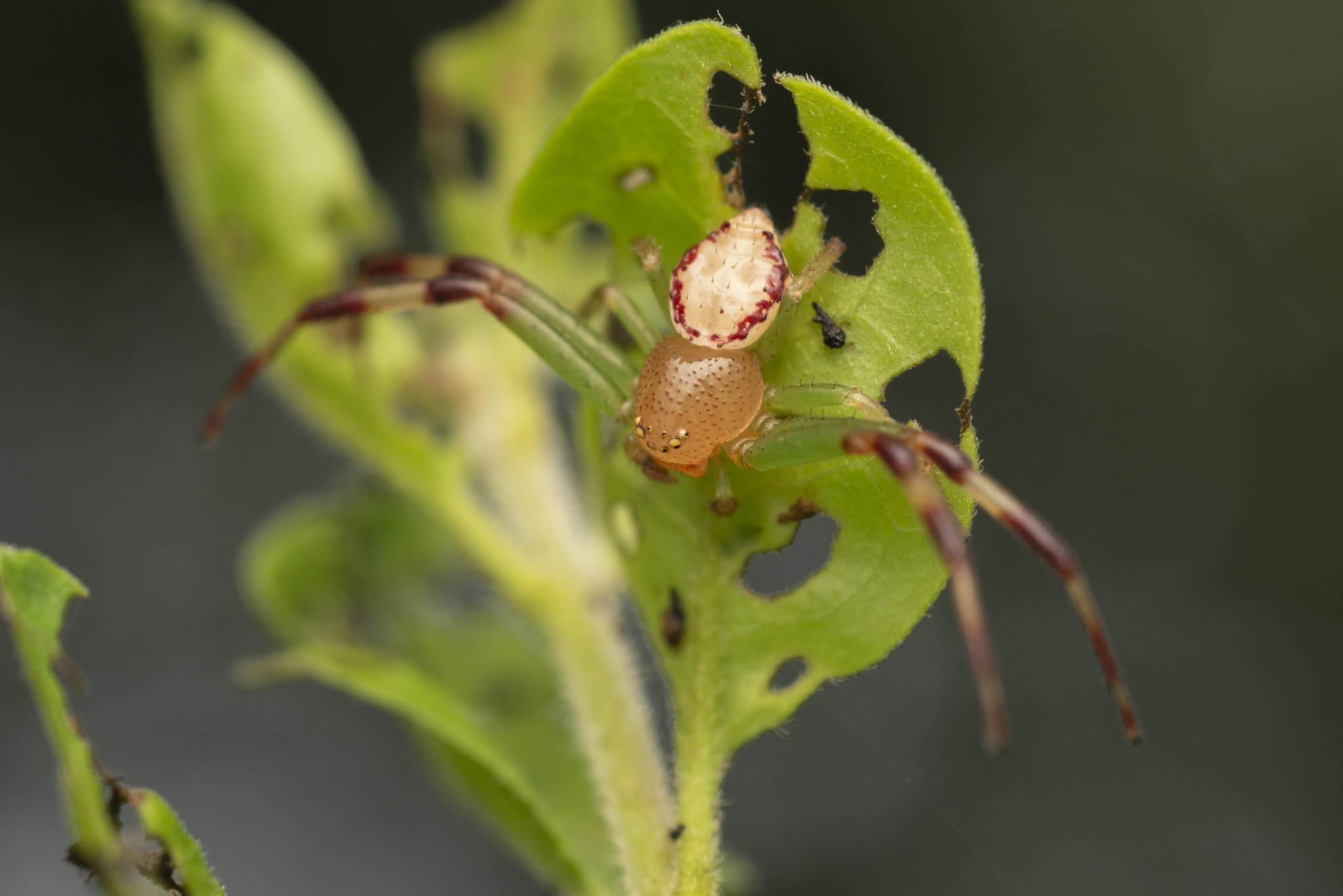
- male from Hong Kong

Scientific classification
- Kingdom: Animalia
- Phylum: Arthropoda
- Subphylum: Chelicerata
- Class: Arachnida
- Order: Araneae
- Infraorder: Araneomorphae
- Family: Thomisidae
- Genus: Massuria
- Species: M. simplex

Binomial name
- Massuria simplex (Xu, Han & Li, 2008)

Synonyms
- Diaea simplex Xu, Han & Li, 2008; Massuria bellula Xu, Han & Li, 2008; Pistius gangulyi Yaginuma & Wen, 1983 (misidentified)

= Massuria simplex =

Species of spider

Massuria simplex is a species of spider in the family Thomisidae (crab spiders). It was originally described as Diaea simplex by Xu, Han & Li in 2008 from Hong Kong, and was transferred to the genus Massuria by Li et al. in 2023.

== Taxonomy ==
M. simplex was originally described as Diaea simplex by Xu, Han & Li in 2008 based on a male specimen collected from Hong Kong. The same authors also described Massuria bellula from the same locality based on a female specimen. In 2023, Li et al. transferred Diaea simplex to the genus Massuria and synonymized M. bellula with it, recognizing that both names referred to the same species.

The species had previously been misidentified as Pistius gangulyi by Yaginuma & Wen (1983), who examined specimens from Hainan Province.

== Distribution ==
M. simplex is known from southern China, including Guangdong Province, Hainan Province, and Hong Kong. There are also observations from.

== Description ==
Like many crab spiders, M. simplex exhibits significant sexual dimorphism, with females being considerably larger than males.

=== Female ===
The female has a total length of 8.07 mm, with a carapace length of 3.72 mm and width of 3.52 mm. The opisthosoma is 4.35 mm long and 4.98 mm wide, wider than it is long, and bears a brown linear mark on the anterior-median region. The legs lack distinct annulations.

The epigyne is distinctive, featuring a W-shaped median plate with laterally positioned copulatory openings. The spermathecae are sac-shaped with several constrictions and appear thinner in the median region compared to the anterior and posterior parts.

=== Male ===
The male is much smaller, with a total length of 3.45 mm and a carapace length of 1.70 mm and width of 1.82 mm. The carapace is broadly oval with densely granulated trichopores. The chelicerae are yellow, straight, and robust, with abundant thick setae on the frontal surface but lacking promarginal and retromarginal teeth.

The opisthosoma is ovoid, 1.75 mm long and 1.72 mm wide, and is yellow with arc-shaped filiform markings laterally. The legs are yellow, with the first and second pairs bearing brown annulations on the patellae, tibiae, metatarsi, and tarsi.

The male pedipalp is diagnostic for the species. The retrolateral tibial apophysis (RTA) is longer than the tibia and features both a ridge-like apophysis near the base and a thick spine-like tip. The embolus arises from and ends at the 3 o'clock position of the tegulum.
