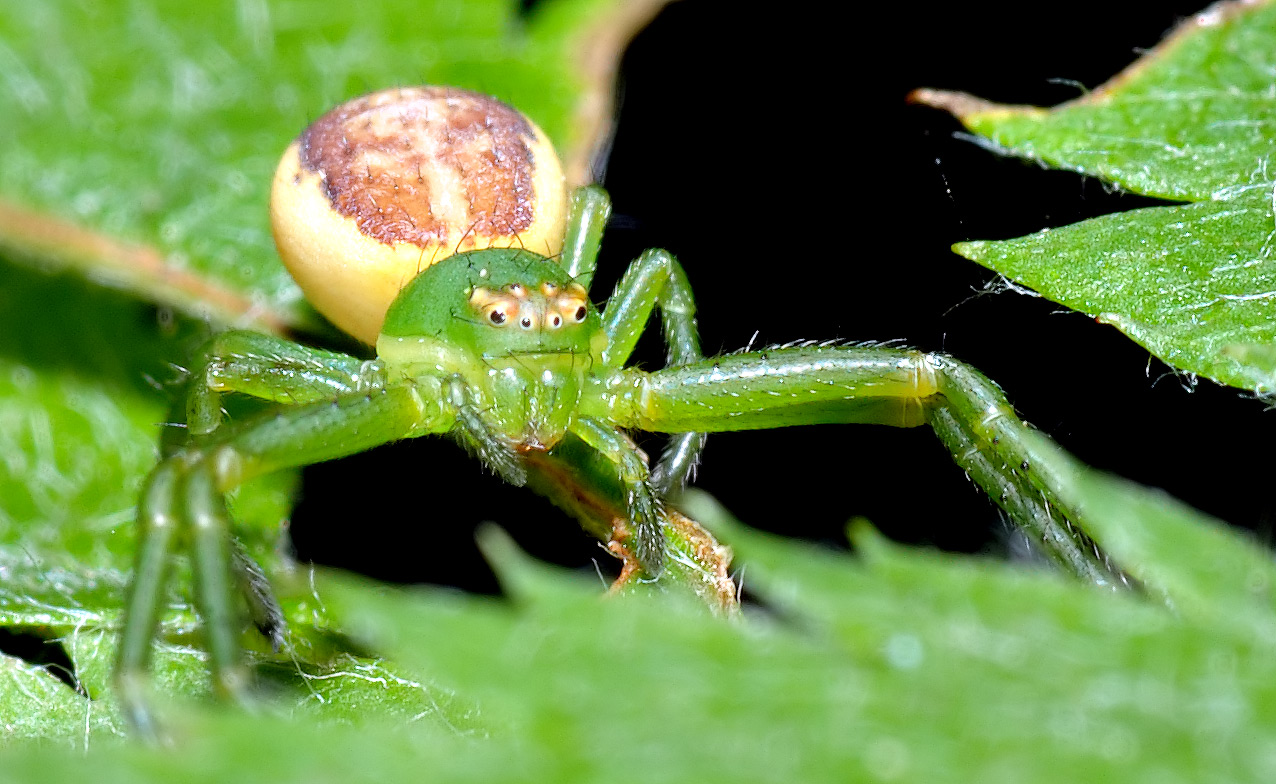

Scientific classification
- Domain: Eukaryota
- Kingdom: Animalia
- Phylum: Arthropoda
- Subphylum: Chelicerata
- Class: Arachnida
- Order: Araneae
- Infraorder: Araneomorphae
- Family: Thomisidae
- Genus: Diaea
- Species: D. dorsata

Binomial name
- Diaea dorsata (Fabricius, 1777)
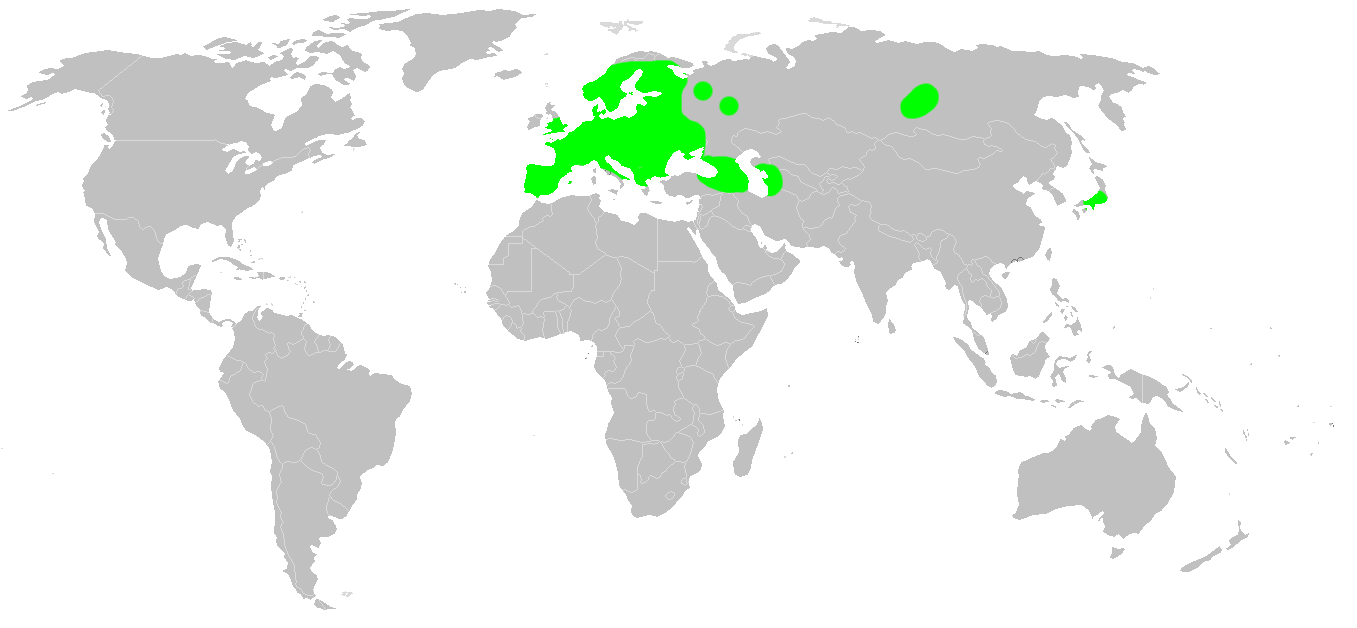

= Diaea dorsata =

Species of spider

Diaea dorsata is one of the smaller crab spiders, with a palearctic distribution. Females can grow up to 6 mm, males up to 4 mm. Prosoma and legs are green, the opisthosoma is yellowish with a brown mark.

Diaea dorsata

Diaea dorsata prefers forest edges. It can be found on oak leaves. The subadults overwinter under the bark of dead trees. Adults appear in May. The males have an extended non-damaging combat ritual: They stand opposed, stretch their front legs and dance around each other. This can go on for hours. This is highly unusual for crab spiders, but for example often found in jumping spiders.

An agranular green pigment is incorporated into the mesocuticle of this species and thus lost between moults.
