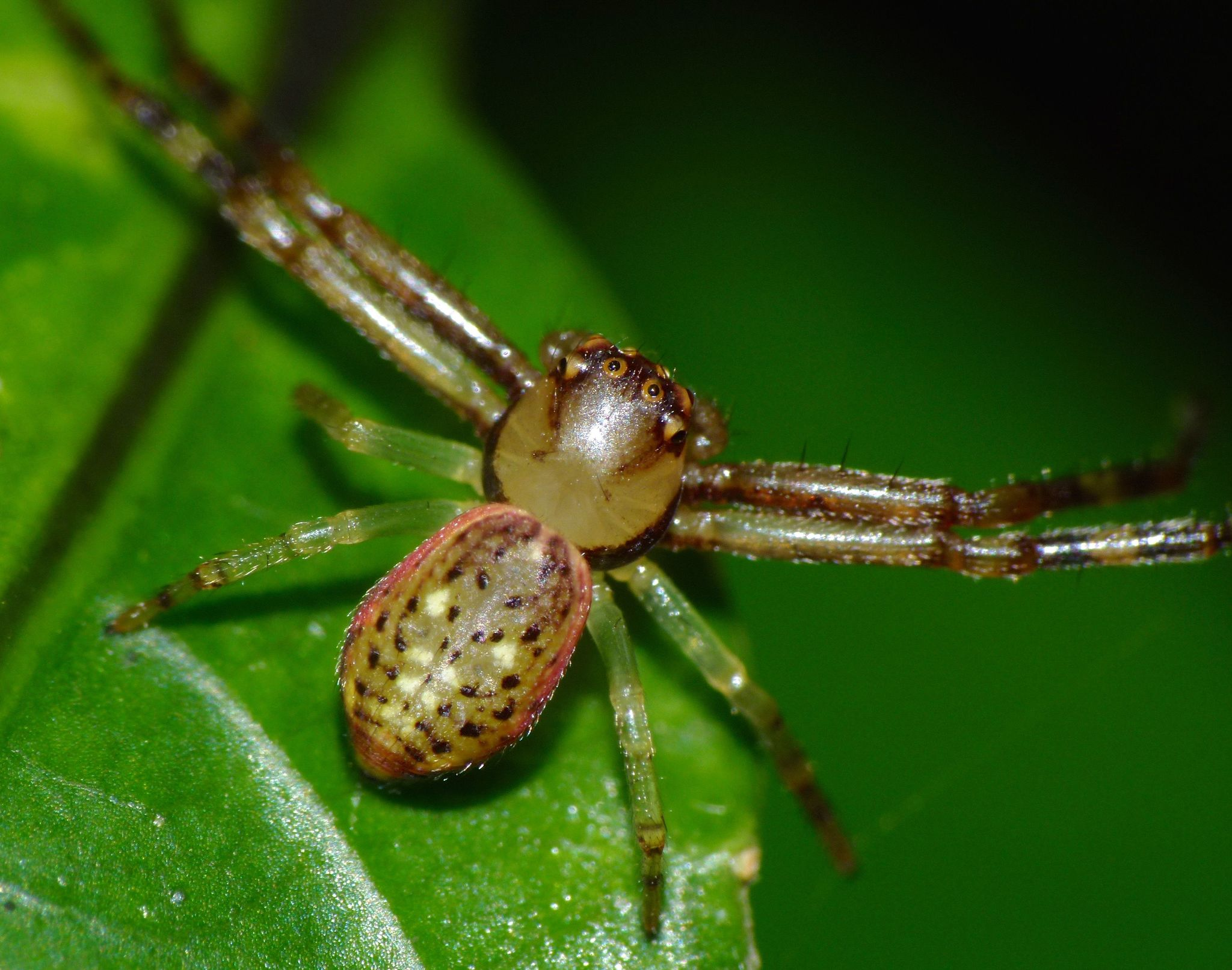

Conservation status
- Not Threatened (NZ TCS)

Scientific classification
- Domain: Eukaryota
- Kingdom: Animalia
- Phylum: Arthropoda
- Subphylum: Chelicerata
- Class: Arachnida
- Order: Araneae
- Infraorder: Araneomorphae
- Family: Thomisidae
- Genus: Diaea
- Species: D. ambara

Binomial name
- Diaea ambara (Urquhart, 1885)

Synonyms
- Philodromus ambarus

= Diaea ambara =

Species of arachnid

Diaea ambara is a species of crab spider that is endemic to New Zealand.

== Taxonomy ==
Diaea ambara was first described in 1885 by Arthur Urquhart as Philodromus ambarus. P. ambarus was later moved to the Diaea genus and redescribed as D. ambara.

== Description ==
Females are about 6mm in length. Cephalothorax is golden brown, abdomen is tan with faint markings. However, colour is very variable and is assumed to aid camouflage.

== Behaviour ==
Diaea ambara are ambush predators that typically hunt on the leaves of bushes and trees.

Males search for the female to begin courtship. The male will approach from the side and use his front legs to touch the females front legs and then her body while she retracts her legs and crouches. The male then proceeds to lash the female down with silk and crawls underneath her and commences mating. After mating, the male leaves and the female easily gets free of the silk.

== Conservation status ==
Under the New Zealand Threat Classification System, this species is listed as "Not Threatened".
