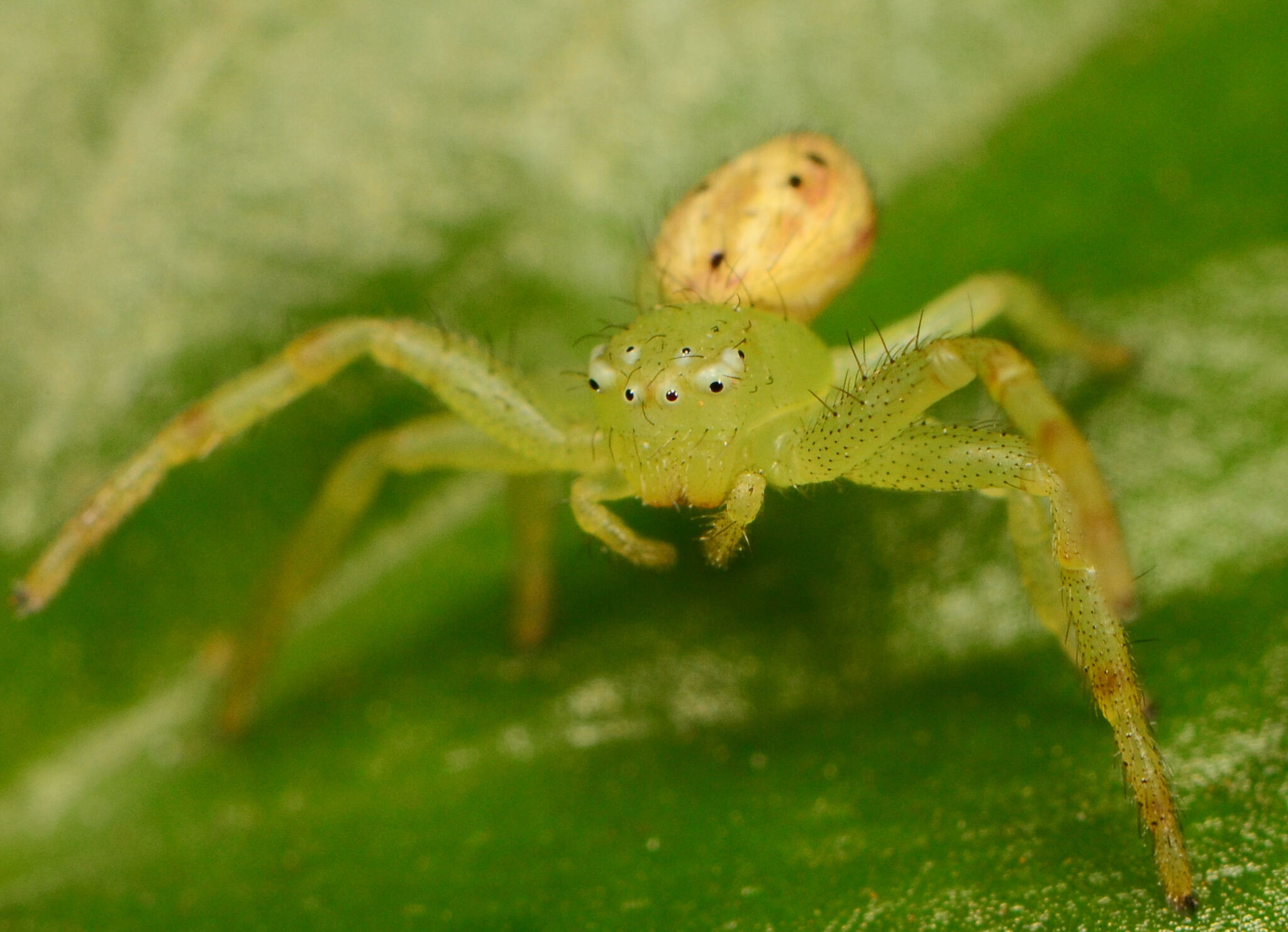
- female
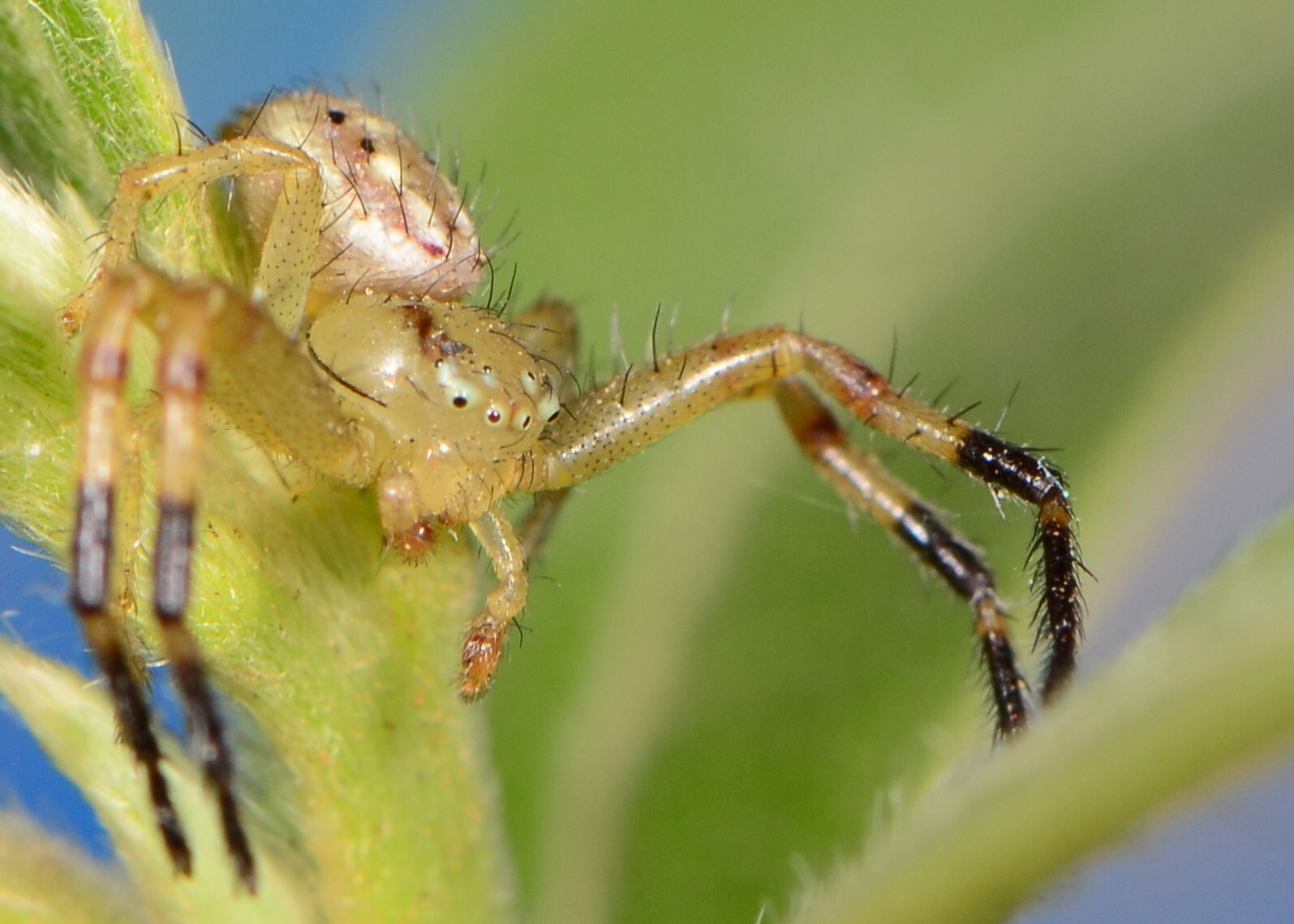
- male

Scientific classification
- Kingdom: Animalia
- Phylum: Arthropoda
- Subphylum: Chelicerata
- Class: Arachnida
- Order: Araneae
- Infraorder: Araneomorphae
- Family: Thomisidae
- Genus: Diaea
- Species: D. rohani

Binomial name
- Diaea rohani Fage, 1923

= Diaea rohani =

Rohan's Diaea crab spider

Species of spider

Diaea rohani is a species of spider in the family Thomisidae. It is found in southern Africa and is commonly known as Rohan's Diaea crab spider.

== Distribution ==
Diaea rohani is found in Angola and South Africa.

In South Africa, it is known from the provinces Eastern Cape, Free State, Gauteng, KwaZulu-Natal, and Western Cape.

== Habitat and ecology ==
Diaea rohani inhabits Grassland and Savanna biomes at altitudes ranging from 496 to 1844 m above sea level.

These free-living plant dwellers are found on trees, shrubs and grasses.

== Description ==
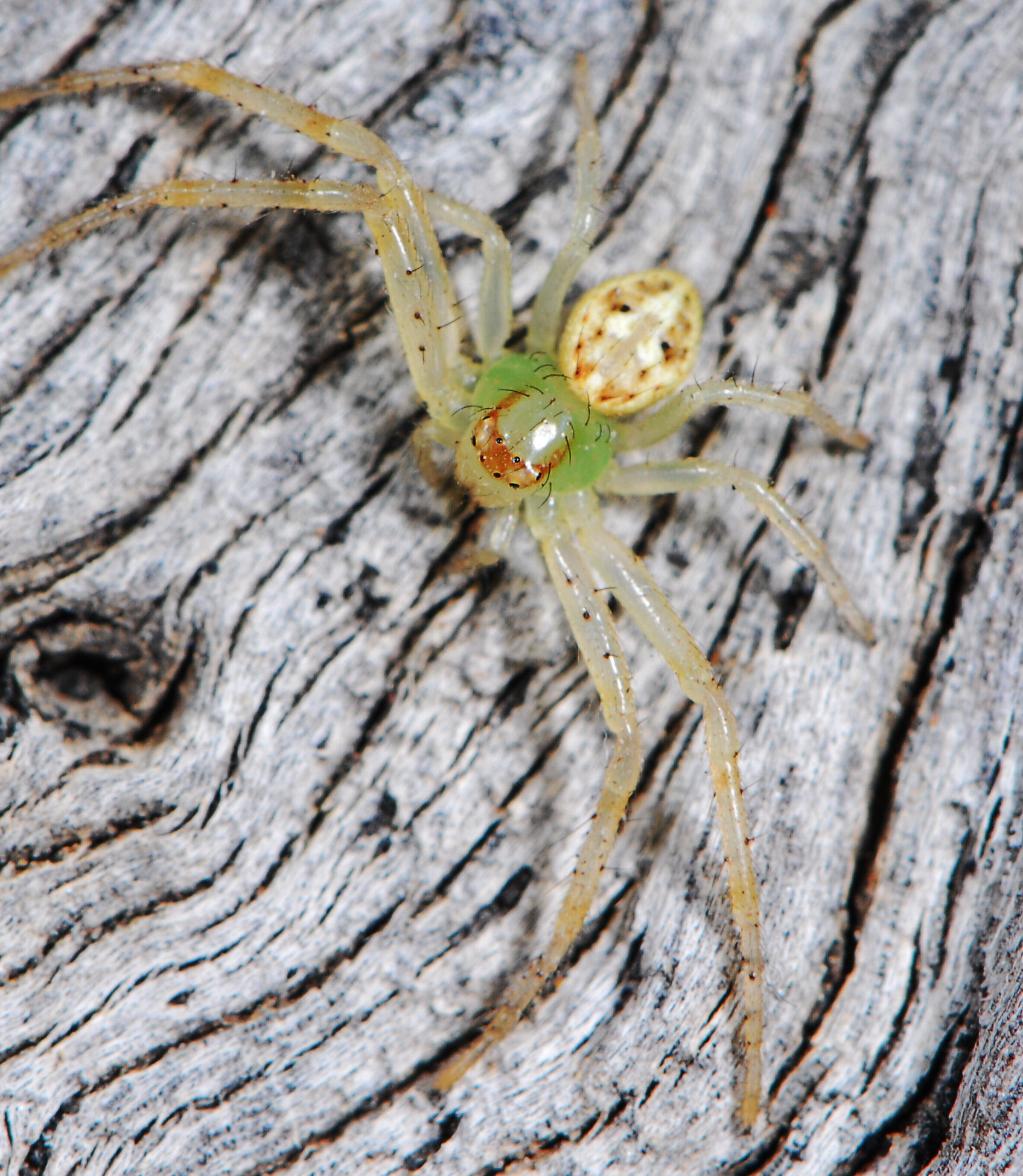
female

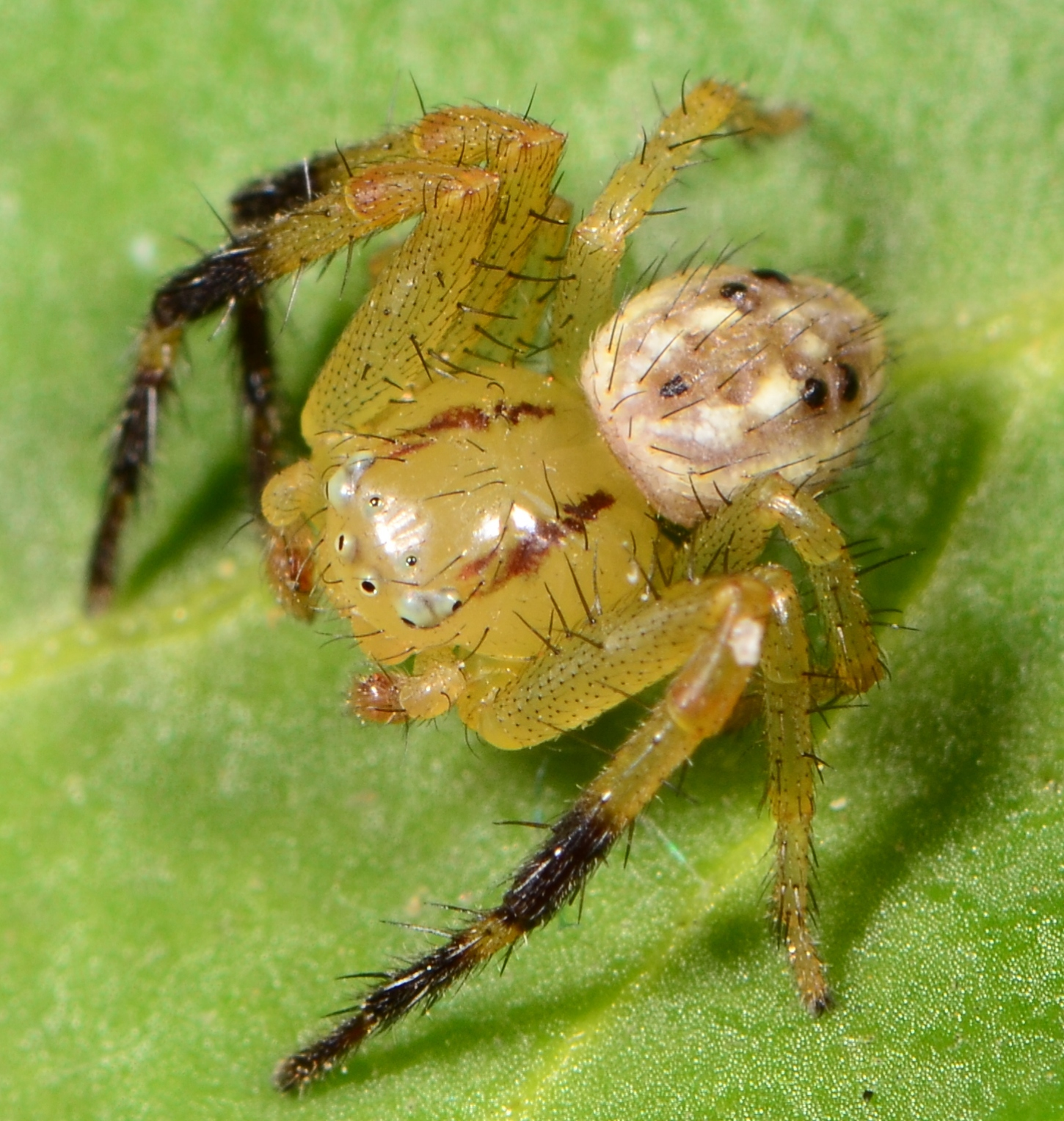
male

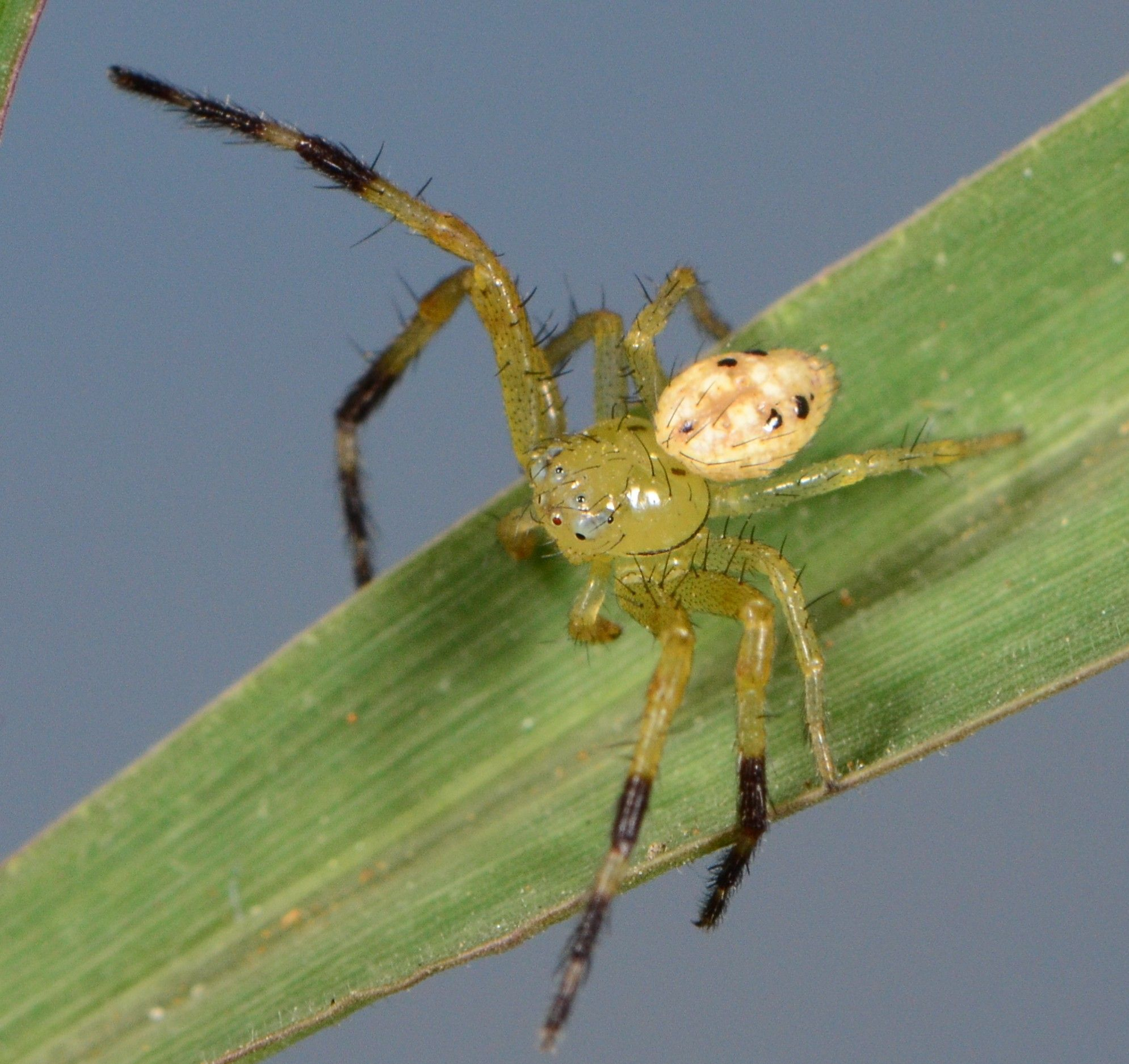
male

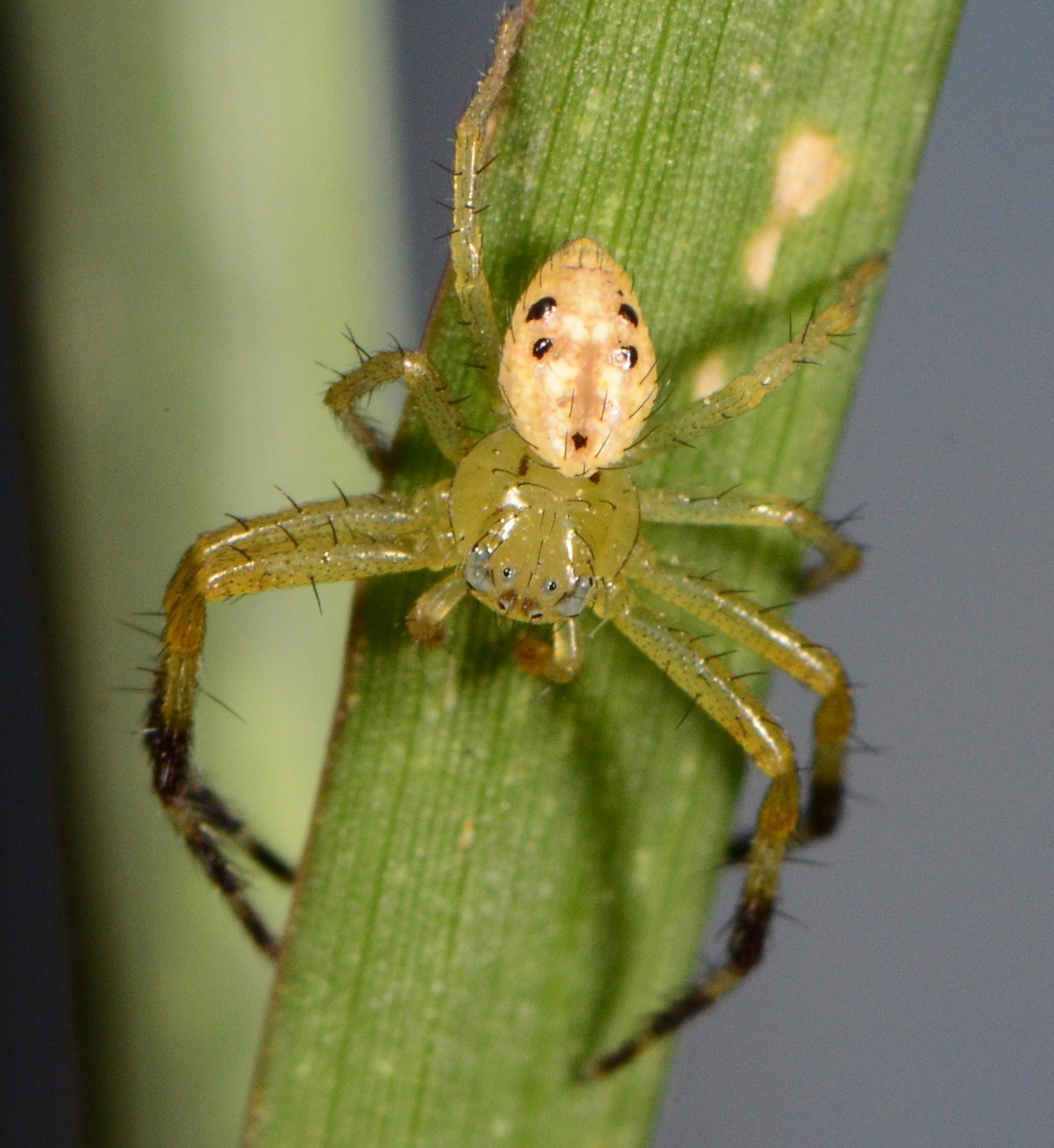
male

== Conservation ==
Diaea rohani is listed as Least Concern by the South African National Biodiversity Institute due to its wide geographical range. It is protected in Aardvark Nature Reserve.

== Taxonomy ==
Diaea rohani was described by Fage in 1923 from Angola. The species is known only from the male.
