= Diaea placata =

Scientific classification
- Kingdom: Animalia
- Phylum: Arthropoda
- Subphylum: Chelicerata
- Class: Arachnida
- Order: Araneae
- Infraorder: Araneomorphae
- Family: Thomisidae
- Genus: Diaea
- Species: D. placata

Binomial name
- Diaea placata O. Pickard-Cambridge, 1899

Species of spider

Diaea placata, is a species of spider of the genus Diaea. It is endemic to Sri Lanka.

== See also ==
- List of Thomisidae species
