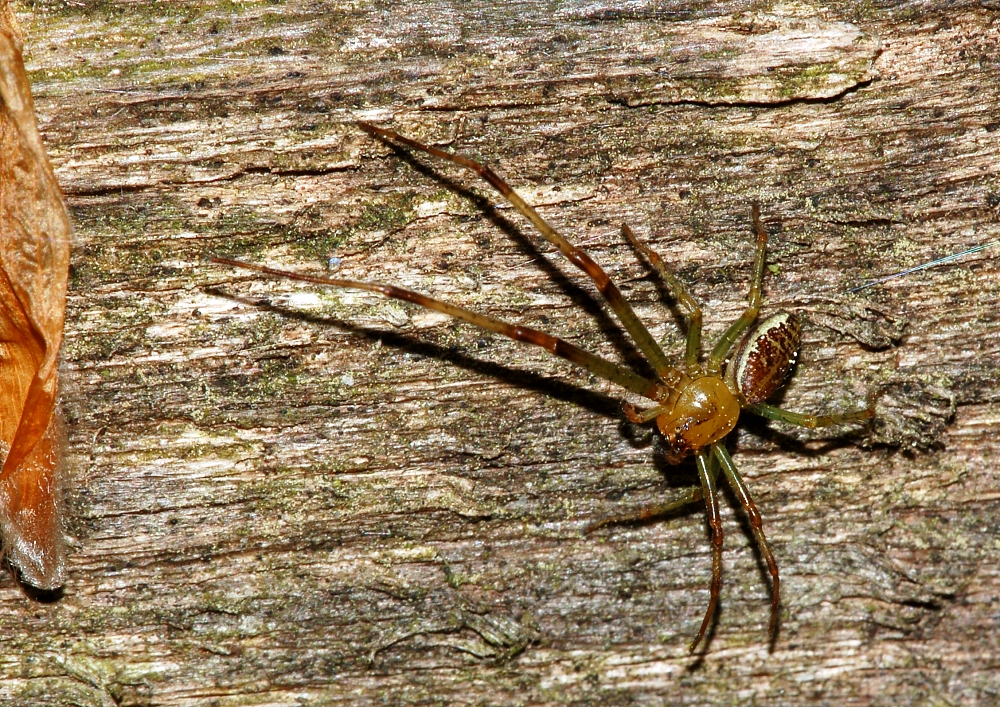

Scientific classification
- Kingdom: Animalia
- Phylum: Arthropoda
- Subphylum: Chelicerata
- Class: Arachnida
- Order: Araneae
- Infraorder: Araneomorphae
- Family: Thomisidae
- Genus: Diaea
- Species: D. livens

Binomial name
- Diaea livens Simon, 1876

= Diaea livens =

Species of spider

Diaea livens is a species of crab spider in the family Thomisidae. It is found in Southern and Central Europe, Turkey, Caucasus, Iran, and has been introduced into the United States.
