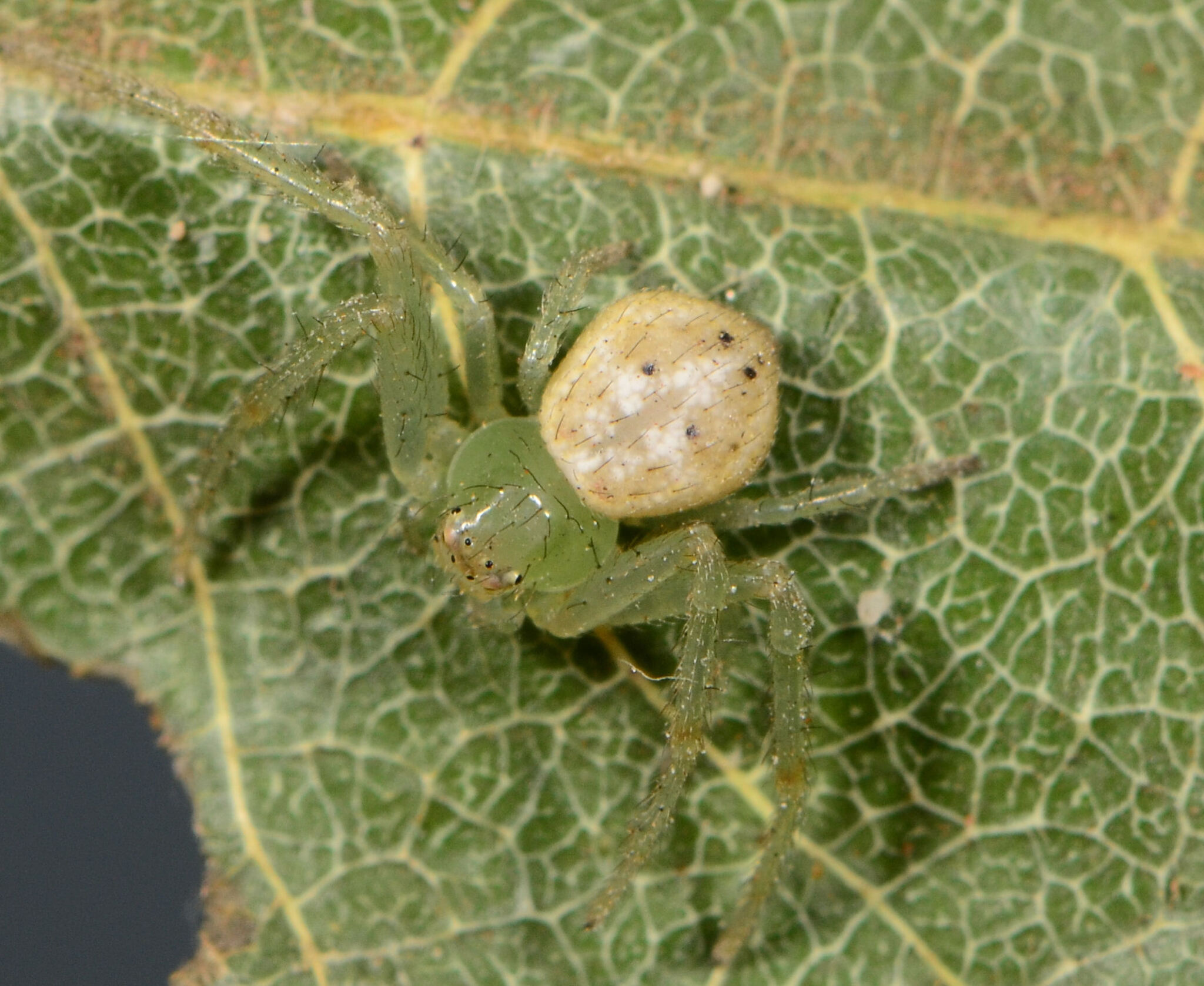
- female
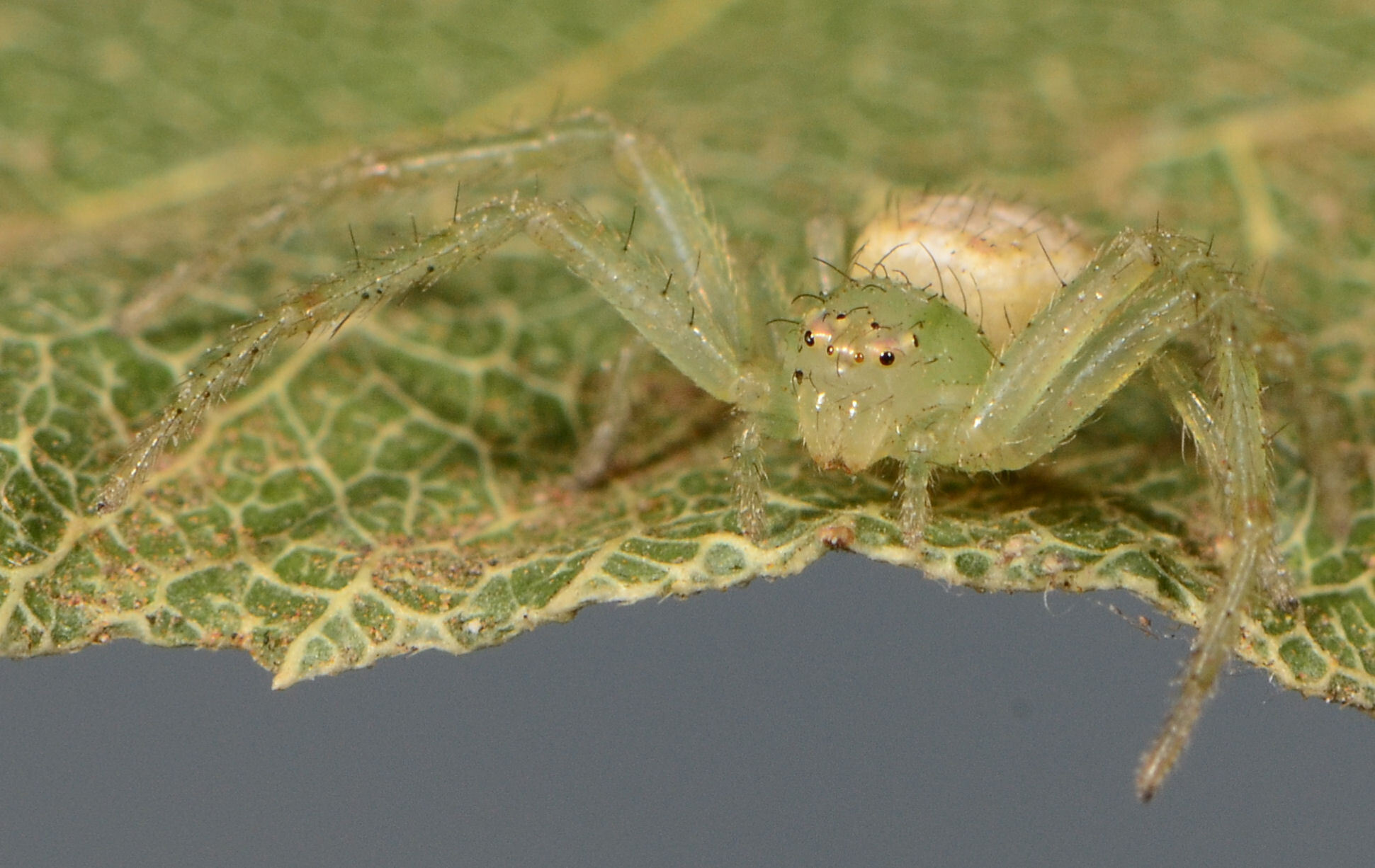
- female

Scientific classification
- Kingdom: Animalia
- Phylum: Arthropoda
- Subphylum: Chelicerata
- Class: Arachnida
- Order: Araneae
- Infraorder: Araneomorphae
- Family: Thomisidae
- Genus: Diaea
- Species: D. viridipes

Binomial name
- Diaea viridipes Strand, 1909

= Diaea viridipes =

Six-spotted Diaea crab spider

Species of spider

Diaea viridipes is a species of spider in the family Thomisidae. It is endemic to South Africa and is commonly known as six-spotted Diaea crab spider.

== Distribution ==
Diaea viridipes is found only in South Africa, where it is known from the Eastern Cape and Western Cape provinces. It is protected in Table Mountain National Park.

== Habitat and ecology ==
Diaea viridipes inhabits the Fynbos Biome at altitudes ranging from 7 to 1059 m above sea level.

These free-living plant dwellers are found on trees, shrubs and grasses.

== Description ==
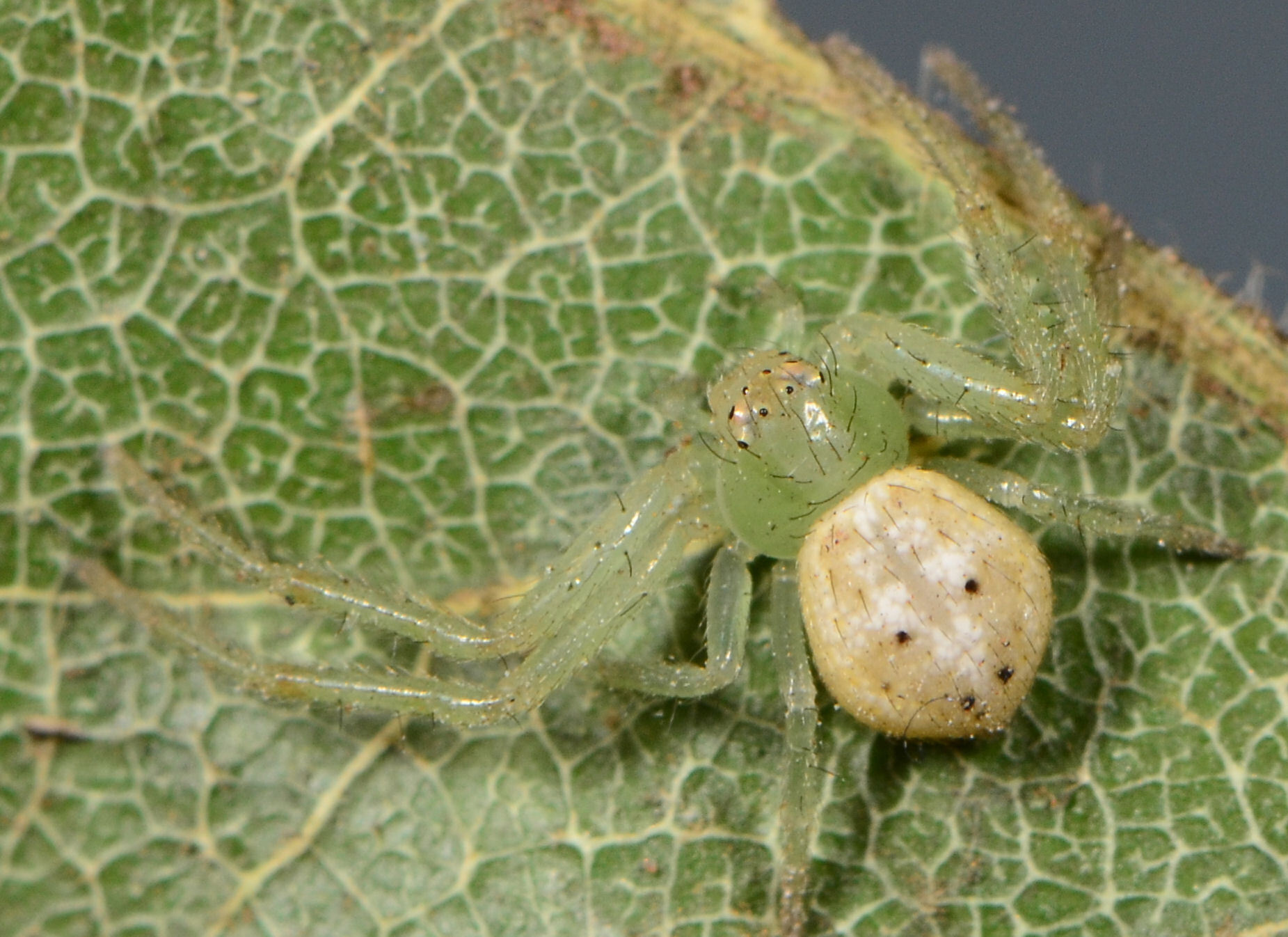
female

== Conservation ==
Diaea viridipes is listed as Data Deficient for taxonomic reasons by the South African National Biodiversity Institute. This species is taxonomically problematic as it has not been revised and there are no illustrations available. It is protected in Table Mountain National Park.

== Etymology ==
The species epithet viridipes is derived from Latin viridis (green) and pes (foot).

== Taxonomy ==
Diaea viridipes was described by Strand in 1909 from Retreat flats near Cape Town. The species is known only from the female and no illustrations are available.
