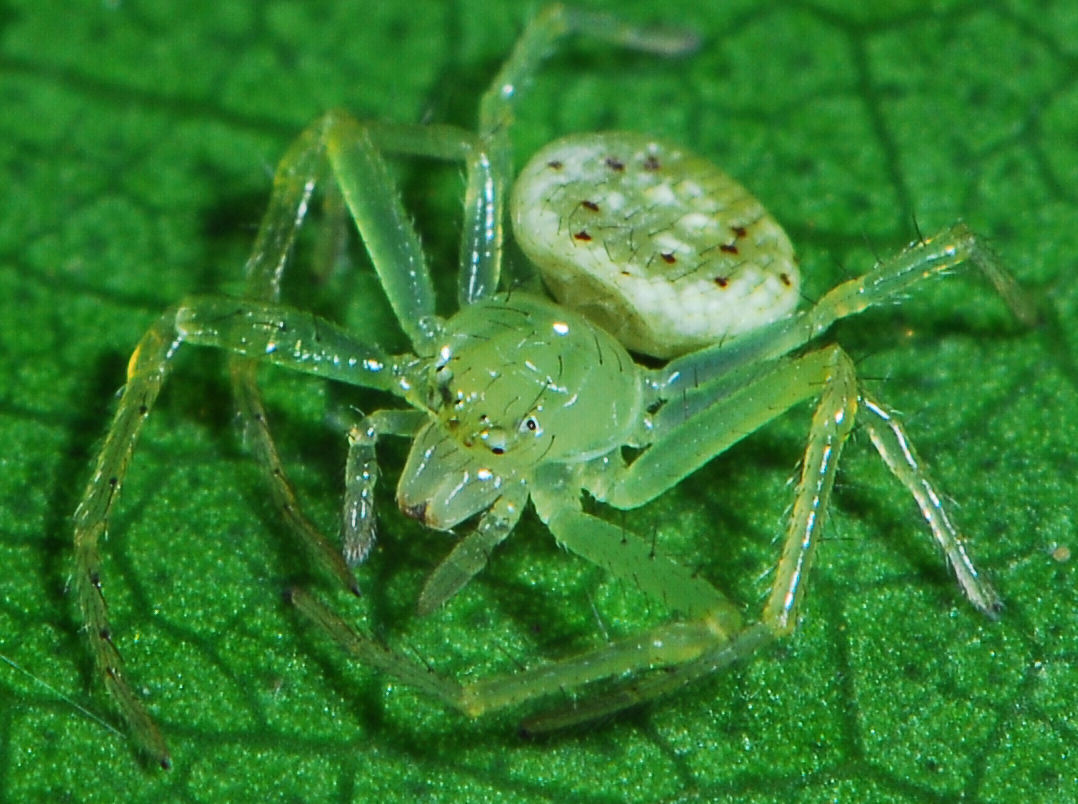
- female
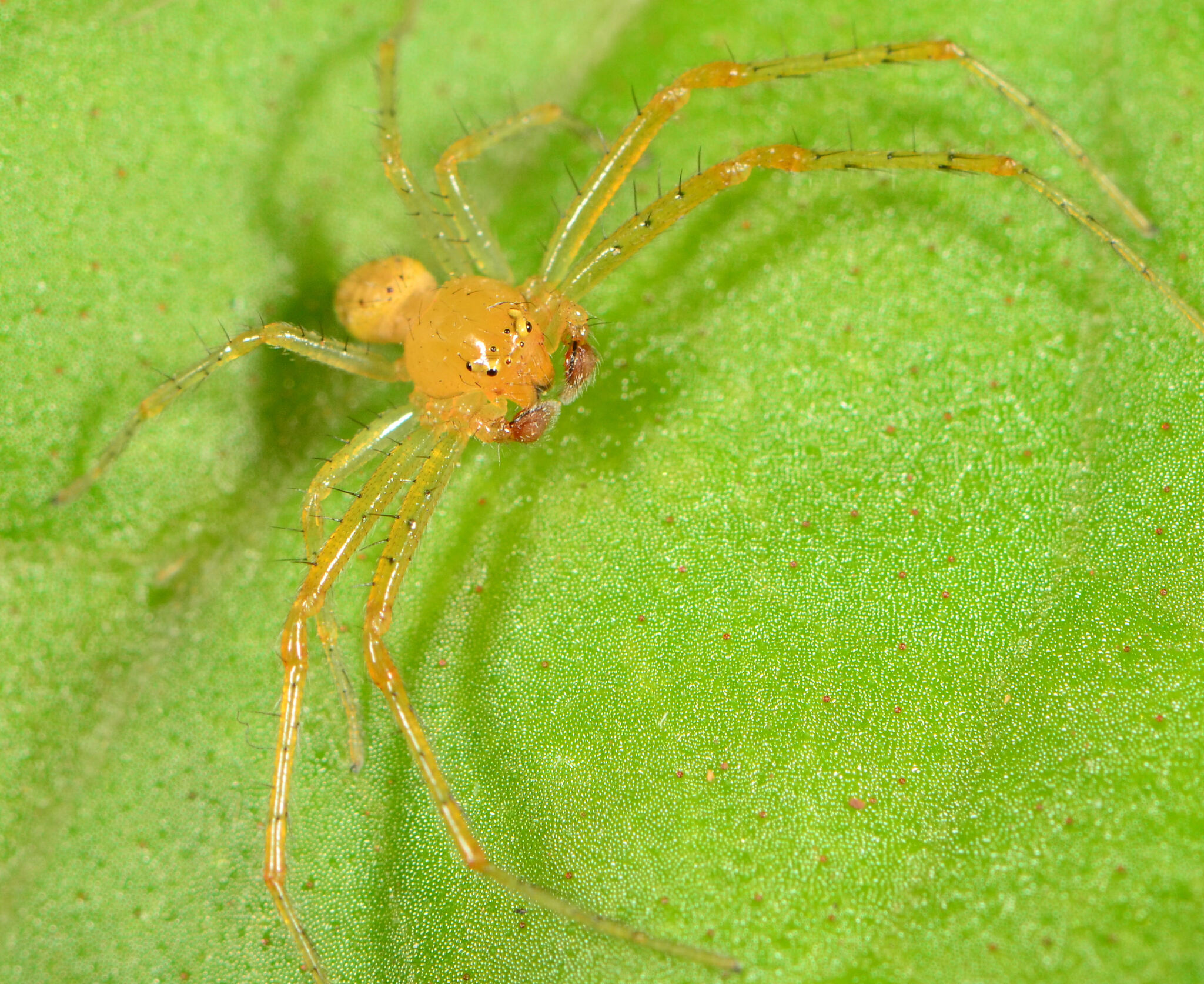
- male

Scientific classification
- Kingdom: Animalia
- Phylum: Arthropoda
- Subphylum: Chelicerata
- Class: Arachnida
- Order: Araneae
- Infraorder: Araneomorphae
- Family: Thomisidae
- Genus: Diaea
- Species: D. puncta

Binomial name
- Diaea puncta Karsch, 1884

Synonyms
- Diaea pluripuncta Mello-Leitão, 1929

= Diaea puncta =

Spotted Diaea crab spider

Species of spider

Diaea puncta is a species of spider in the family Thomisidae. It is found throughout Africa and is commonly known as spotted Diaea crab spider.

== Distribution ==
Diaea puncta is found widely throughout Africa. In southern Africa it is known from Lesotho, Eswatini and South Africa.

In South Africa, it is known from all the provinces.

== Habitat and ecology ==
Diaea puncta inhabits all the floral biomes except the Desert Biome at altitudes ranging from 4 to 2020 m above sea level.

These free-living plant dwellers very commonly found on vegetation. The species was also sampled from crops including avocado, cotton, pistachio and strawberries.

== Description ==
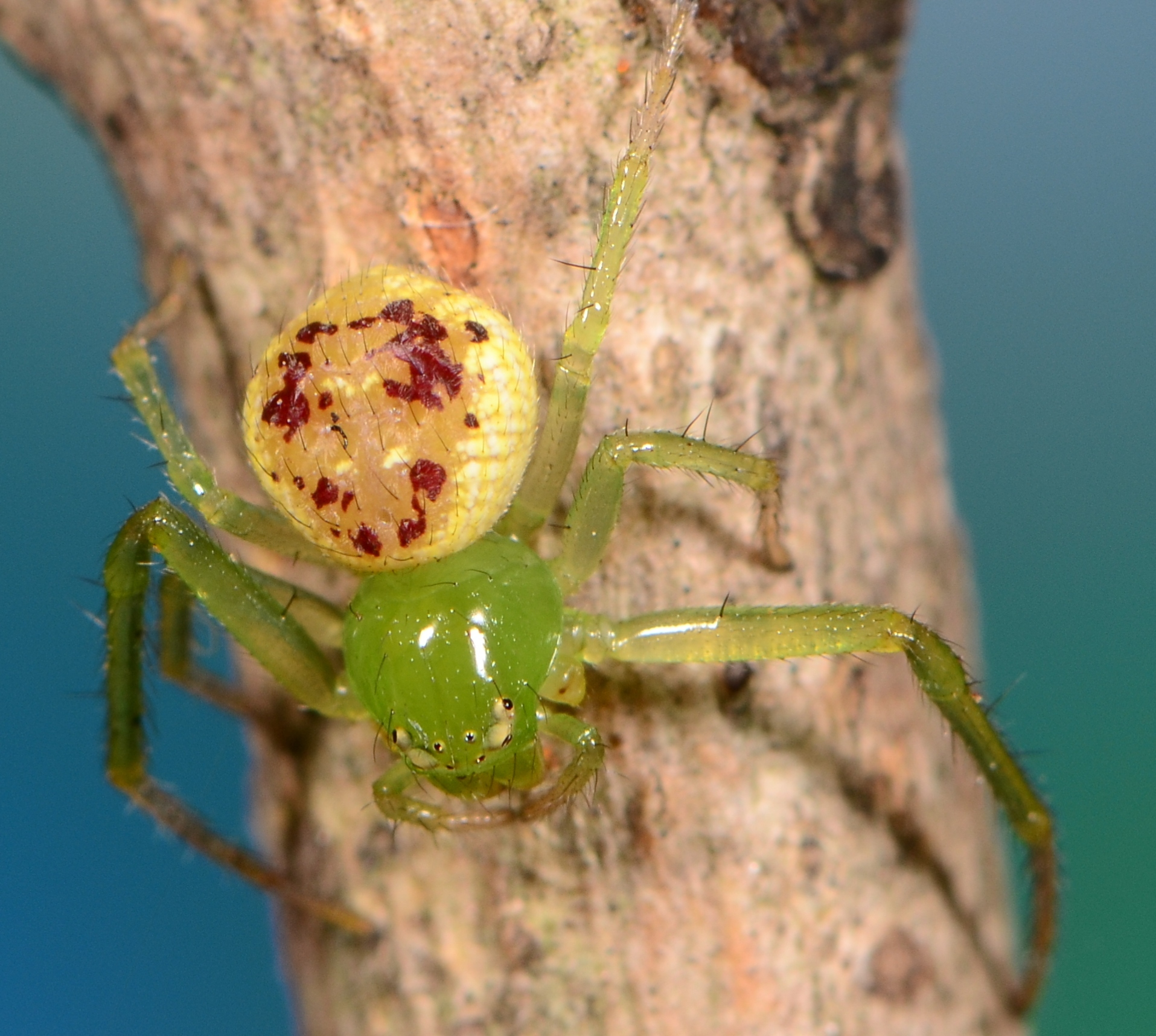
female

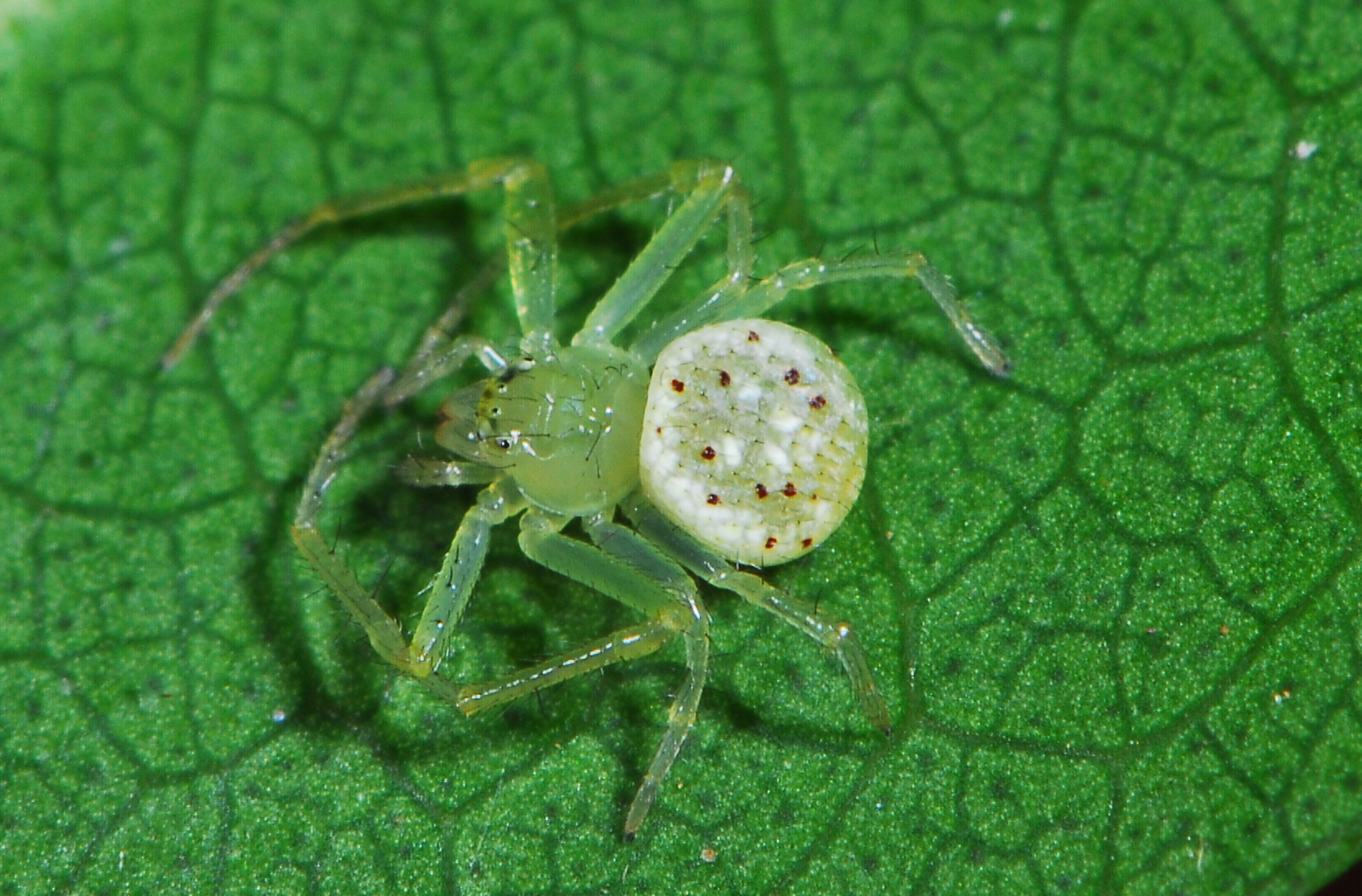
female

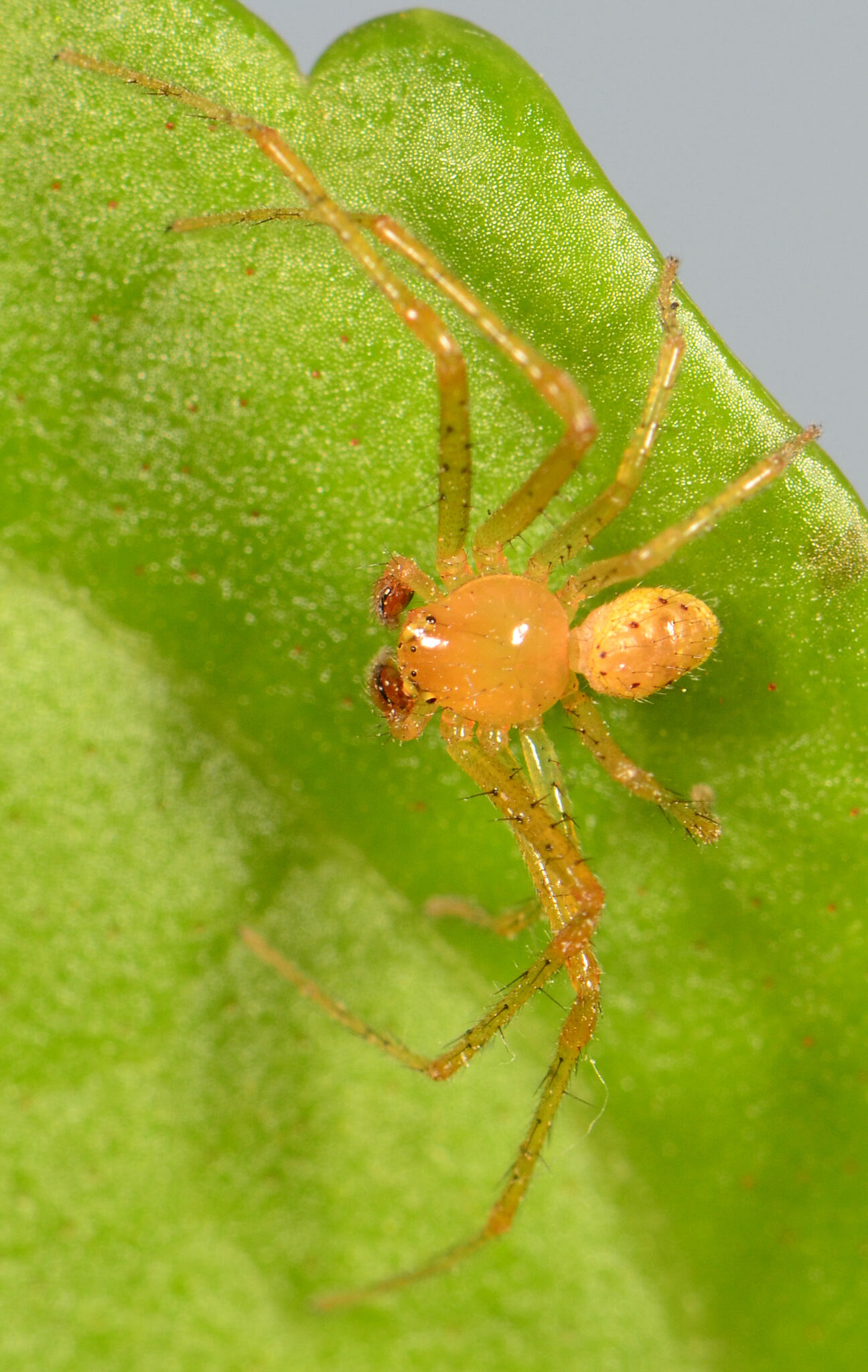
male

== Conservation ==
Diaea puncta is listed as Least Concern by the South African National Biodiversity Institute due to its wide geographical range. It is protected in more than ten protected areas.

== Taxonomy ==
Diaea puncta was described by Karsch in 1884 from Ilhéu das Rolas, an island in São Tomé. Mello-Leitão created the superfluous replacement name Diaea pluripuncta in 1929.
