= Massuria =

Scientific classification
- Domain: Eukaryota
- Kingdom: Animalia
- Phylum: Arthropoda
- Subphylum: Chelicerata
- Class: Arachnida
- Order: Araneae
- Infraorder: Araneomorphae
- Family: Thomisidae
- Genus: Massuria; Thorell, 1887

Type species
- Massuria angulata

Species
- 8, see text

Genus of spiders

Massuria is a genus of spiders in the family Thomisidae. It was first described in 1887 by Tamerlan Thorell. As of 2017, it contains 8 Asian species.

== Species ==
Massuria comprises the following species:

- Massuria angulata Thorell, 1887 – Myanmar
- Massuria bandian Tang & Li, 2010 – China
- Massuria bellula Xu, Han & Li, 2008 – China (Hong Kong)
- Massuria min Li, Yao, Xiao, Xu et Liu, 2023 – China
- Massuria ovalis Tang & Li, 2010 – China
- Massuria roonwali (Basu, 1964) – India
- Massuria sreepanchamii (Tikader, 1962) – India
- Massuria uthoracica Sen, Saha & Raychaudhuri, 2012 – India
- Massuria watari Ono, 2002 – Japan
