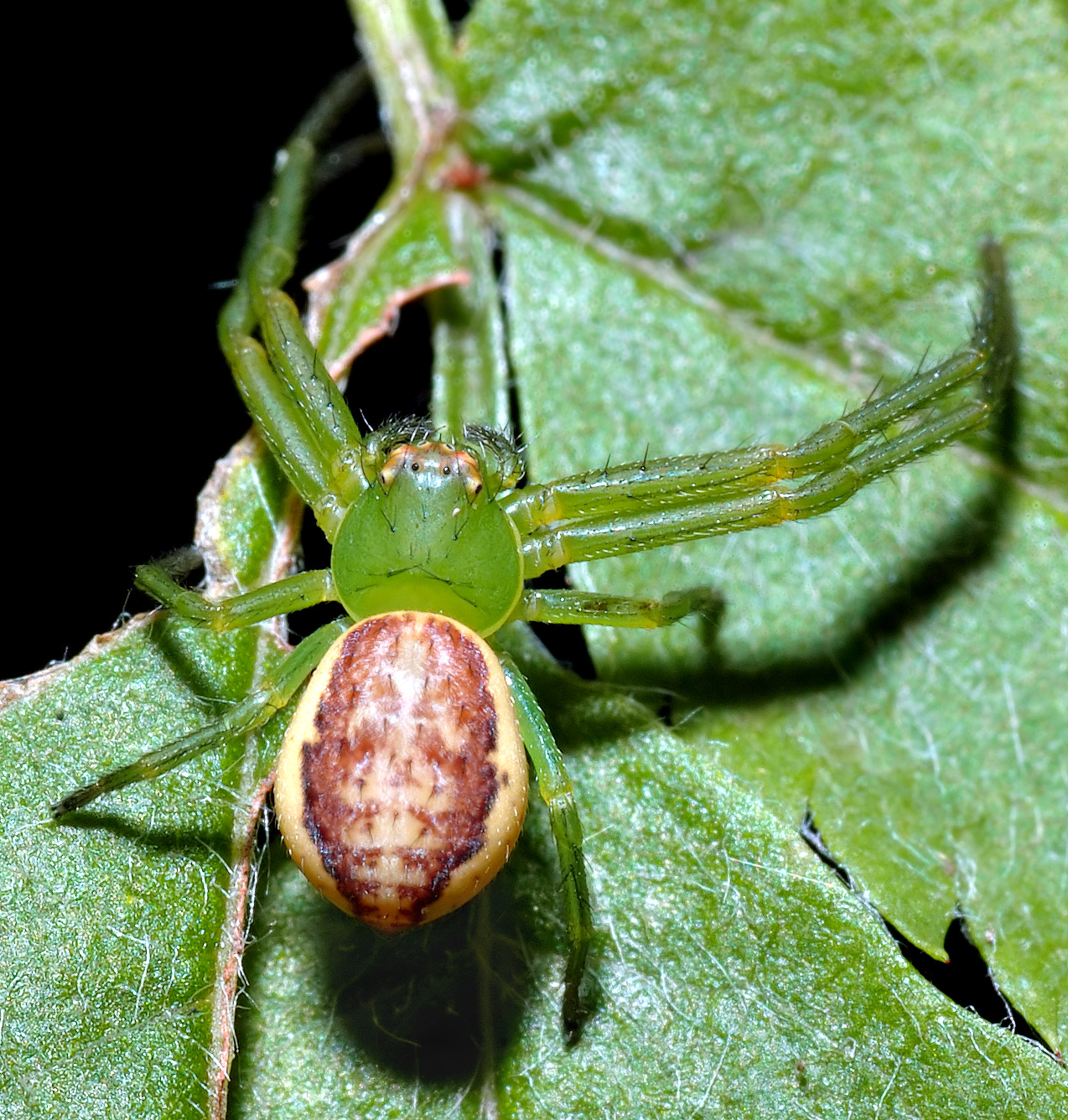
- D. dorsata
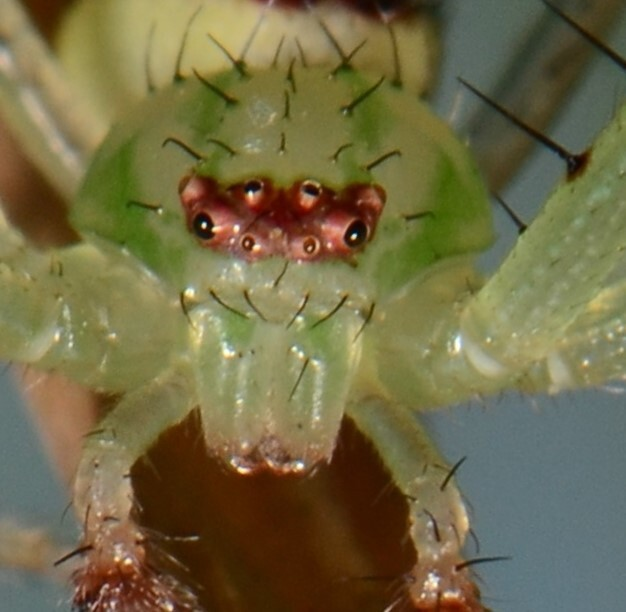
- male D. longisetosa

Scientific classification
- Kingdom: Animalia
- Phylum: Arthropoda
- Subphylum: Chelicerata
- Class: Arachnida
- Order: Araneae
- Infraorder: Araneomorphae
- Family: Thomisidae
- Genus: Diaea; Thorell, 1869

Type species
- D. dorsata (Fabricius, 1777)

Species
- 46, see text

= Diaea =

Genus of spiders

Diaea is a genus of crab spiders first described by Tamerlan Thorell in 1869. Most species are found in specific locations except for D. livens, which occurs in the United States and D. dorsata, which has a palearctic distribution. Adults are 5 millimetres (0.20 in) to 7 millimetres (0.28 in) and tend to hide in and around vegetation, especially flowers, where their color allows them to blend in to their surroundings.

== Life style ==
They are found on trees, shrubs and grasses and very commonly sampled beating and sweeping vegetation.

== Description ==
Females and males are 4 to 5 mm in total length, with males more slender than females and their legs longer.

The carapace can be white, yellow or green, sometimes darker around the eye region, with smooth integument bearing simple, isolated setae. The carapace is moderately convex above and armed with long setae. The lateral eyes are on tubercles. Both eye rows are recurved and almost the same length. The posterior median eyes are closer to each other than to posterior lateral eyes.

The abdomen is round in females and oval in males, white, yellow or green, and usually decorated with darker spots or markings. The legs are thin and slender, usually the same colour as the carapace, and sometimes banded.

== Species ==
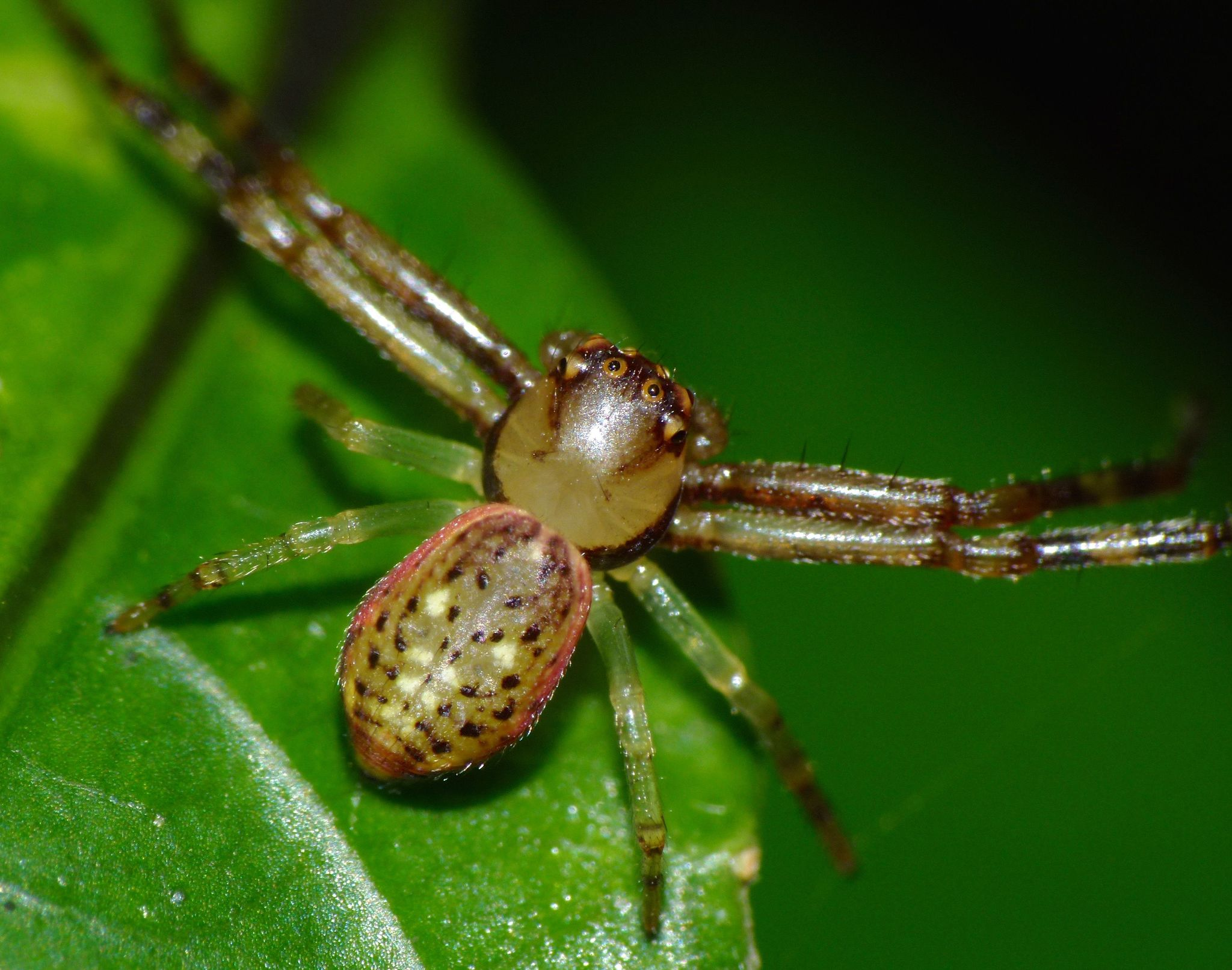
D. ambara

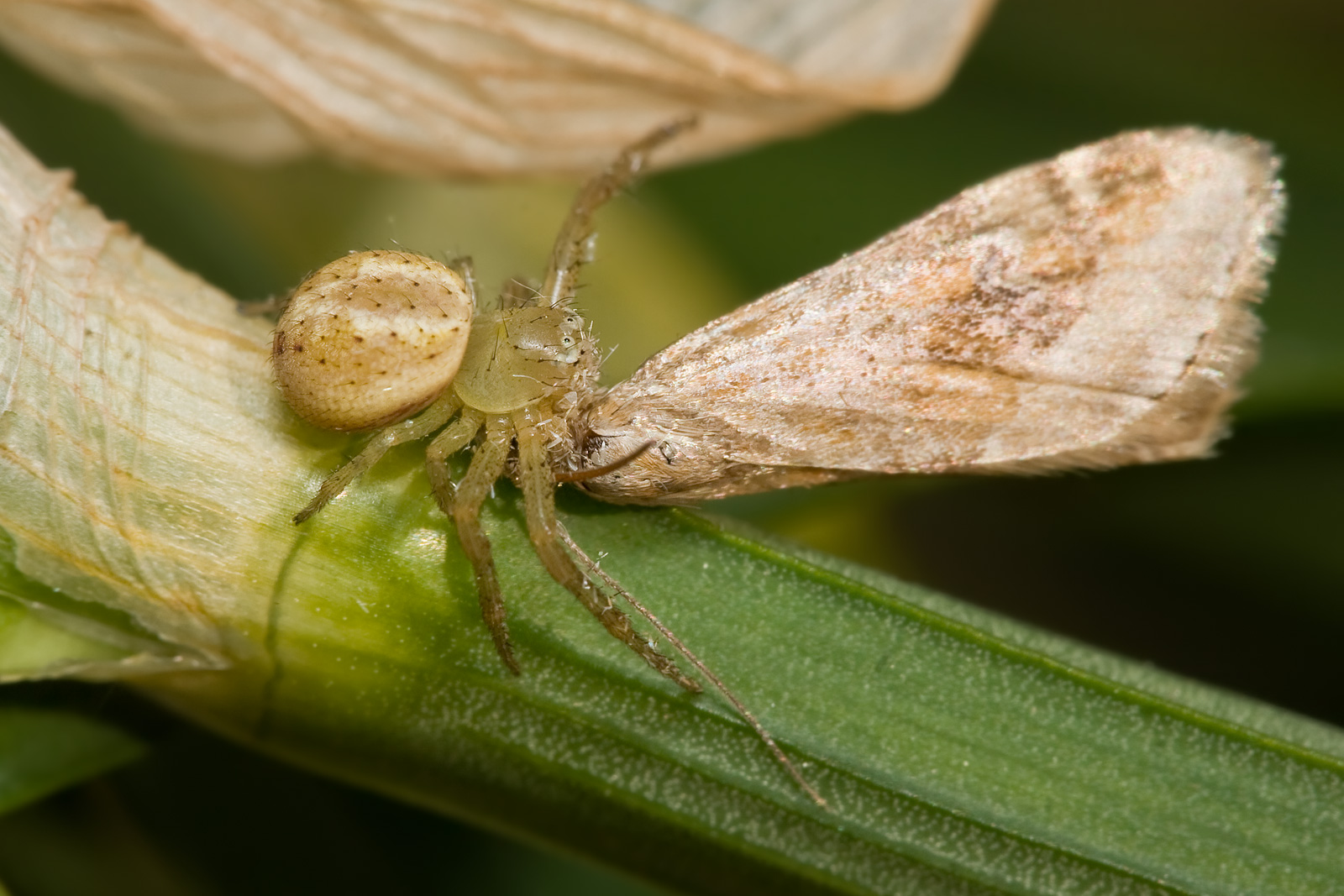
D. evanida

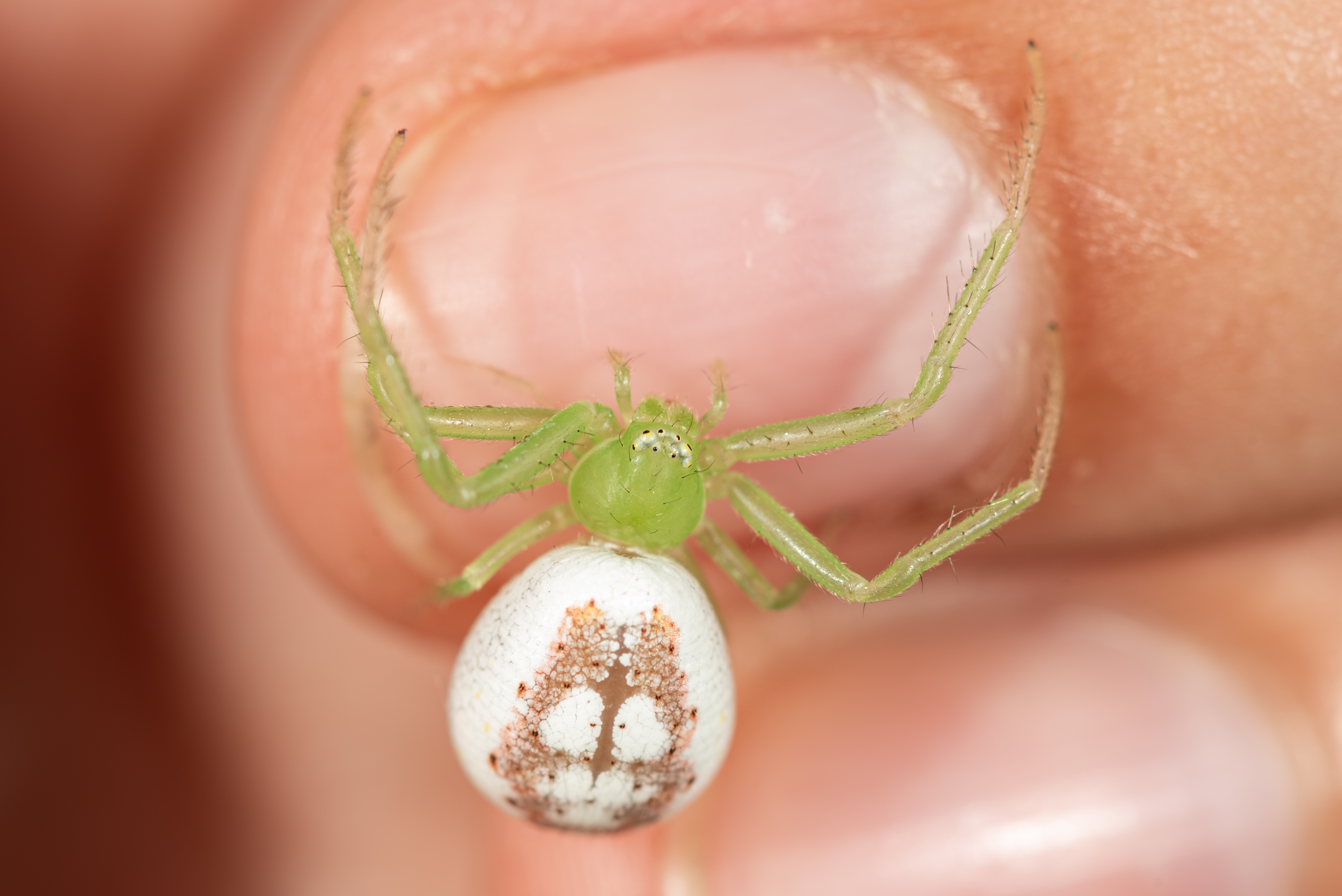
female D. livens

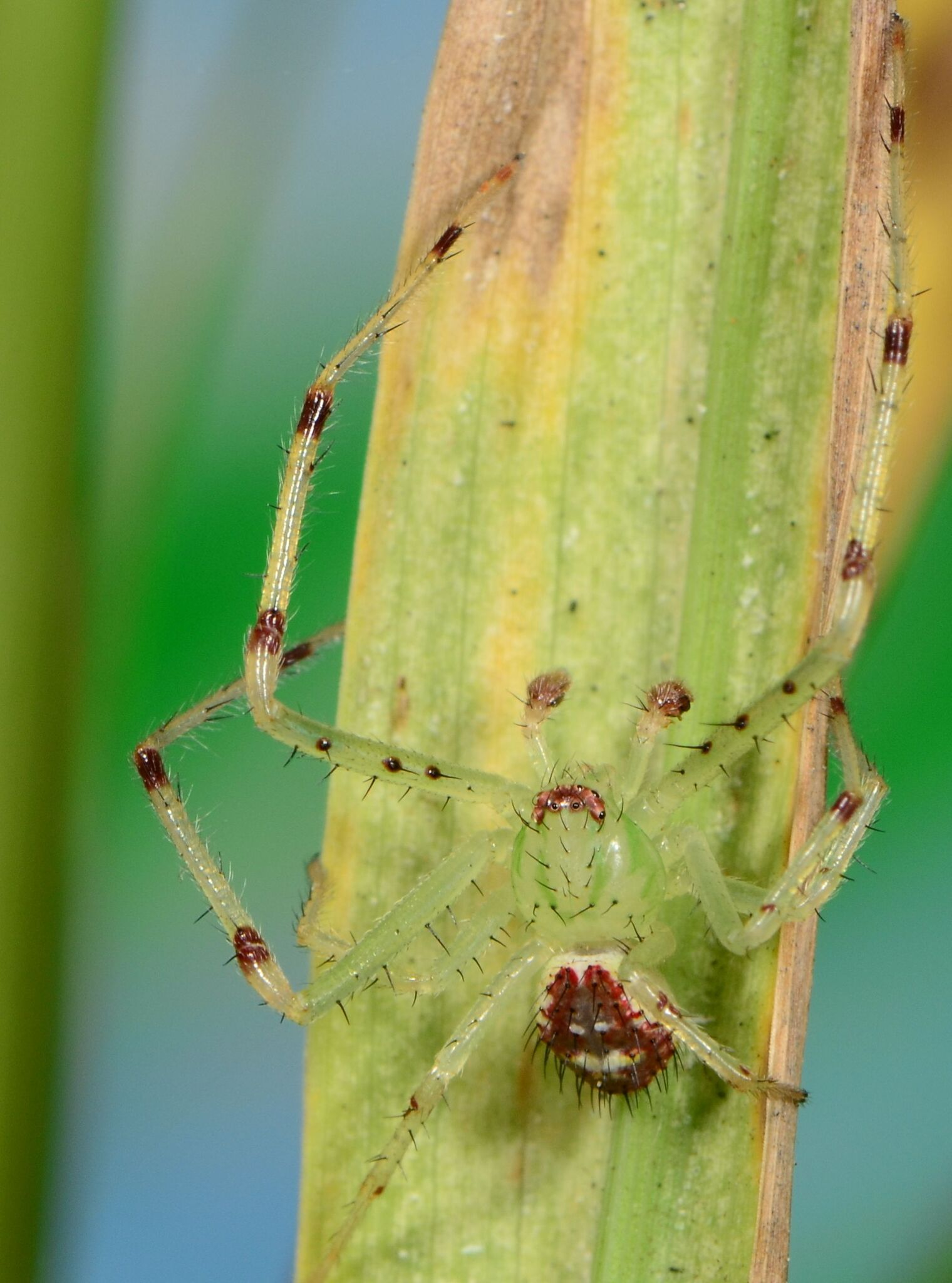
male D. longisetosa

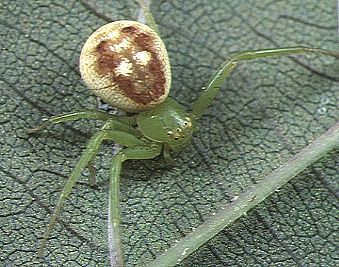
female D. subdola

As of September 2025, this genus includes 46 species:

- Diaea albicincta Pavesi, 1883 – Ethiopia, Tanzania, South Africa
- Diaea albolimbata L. Koch, 1875 – New Zealand
- Diaea ambara (Urquhart, 1885) – New Zealand
- Diaea bengalensis Biswas & Mazumder, 1981 – India
- Diaea bipunctata Rainbow, 1902 – Vanuatu
- Diaea carangali Barrion & Litsinger, 1995 – Philippines
- Diaea delata Karsch, 1880 – Angola
- Diaea doleschalli Hogg, 1915 – Indonesia (New Guinea)
- Diaea dorsata (Fabricius, 1777) – Europe, Turkey, Caucasus, Russia (Europe to Middle Siberia), Iran (type species)
- Diaea erji Chen, Liu & Hu, 2025 – China
- Diaea giltayi Roewer, 1938 – Indonesia (New Guinea)
- Diaea graphica Simon, 1882 – Yemen
- Diaea gyoja Ono, 1985 – Russia (Far East), Japan
- Diaea implicata Jézéquel, 1966 – Ivory Coast
- Diaea insignis Thorell, 1877 – Indonesia (Sulawesi)
- Diaea limbata Kulczyński, 1911 – Indonesia (New Guinea)
- Diaea livens Simon, 1876 – Southern and Central Europe, Turkey, Caucasus, Iran. Introduced to United States
- Diaea longisetosa Roewer, 1961 – Senegal, South Africa
- Diaea mikhailovi Zhang, Song & Zhu, 2004 – China
- Diaea mutabilis Kulczyński, 1901 – Ethiopia
- Diaea nakajimai Ono, 1993 – Madagascar
- Diaea ocellata Rainbow, 1898 – Papua New Guinea
- Diaea osmanii Zamani & Marusik, 2017 – Iran
- Diaea papuana Kulczyński, 1911 – Indonesia (New Guinea)
- Diaea placata O. Pickard-Cambridge, 1899 – Sri Lanka
- Diaea pougneti Simon, 1886 – India
- Diaea proclivis Simon, 1903 – Equatorial Guinea
- Diaea puncta Karsch, 1884 – Sub-Saharan Africa
- Diaea rohani Fage, 1923 – Angola, South Africa
- Diaea rufoannulata Simon, 1880 – New Caledonia
- Diaea semilutea Simon, 1903 – Equatorial Guinea
- Diaea seminola Gertsch, 1939 – United States
- Diaea septempunctata L. Koch, 1874 – Tonga, Papua New Guinea?
- Diaea shirleyi Hogg, 1922 – Vietnam
- Diaea sphaeroides (Urquhart, 1885) – New Zealand
- Diaea spiniformis (Yang, Zhu & Song, 2006) – China
- Diaea spinosa Keyserling, 1880 – Colombia
- Diaea subdola O. Pickard-Cambridge, 1885 – Pakistan, India, China, Russia (Far East), Korea, Japan
- Diaea suspiciosa O. Pickard-Cambridge, 1885 – Central Asia, Mongolia, China, India?
- Diaea tadtadtinika Barrion & Litsinger, 1995 – Philippines
- Diaea taibeli Caporiacco, 1949 – Kenya
- Diaea terrena Dyal, 1935 – Pakistan
- Diaea tianpingensis Liu, Zhang & Chen, 2021 – China
- Diaea tongatabuensis Strand, 1913 – Polynesia
- Diaea viridipes Strand, 1909 – South Africa
- Diaea zonura Thorell, 1892 – Indonesia (Sumatra, Java)
