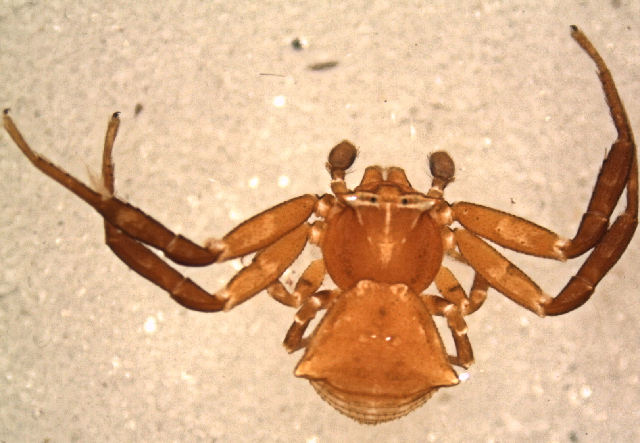
- male from South Africa

Scientific classification
- Kingdom: Animalia
- Phylum: Arthropoda
- Subphylum: Chelicerata
- Class: Arachnida
- Order: Araneae
- Infraorder: Araneomorphae
- Family: Thomisidae
- Genus: Thomisus
- Species: T. machadoi

Binomial name
- Thomisus machadoi Comellini, 1959

= Thomisus machadoi =

Species of spider

Thomisus machadoi is a species of crab spider in the family Thomisidae. It is found across several countries in Africa including Angola, Cape Verde, and South Africa.

== Etymology ==
The species was named after a person with the name Machado, though the original description does not mention details.

== Distribution ==
Thomisus machadoi has been recorded from three African countries. In South Africa, it is known from six provinces, at elevations ranging from 54 to 1,637 meters above sea level.

== Habitat ==
Thomisus machadoi is a free-living spider that inhabits plants across various biomes including Fynbos, Grassland, Nama Karoo, and Savanna. The species has also been recorded in agricultural settings, particularly pistachio orchards.

== Description ==
Thomisus machadoi is known only from male specimens.

Males have a total length of 3.2 mm with a cephalothorax length of 2.1 mm and width of 2.1 mm. The carapace is brown with a slightly paler eye area, while the opisthosoma is pale brown with darker brown lateral sides. All legs are brown, with legs I and II being darker than the remaining pairs. The metatarsi and tibiae of legs I and II show slight banding.

The carapace is elevated with eye tubercles that are not sharply pointed and directed slightly dorsally. The anterior eyes are larger than the posterior eyes. The opisthosoma is bell-shaped. The tibiae and metatarsi of legs I and II bear long, thin macrosetae.

The male pedipalp shows distinctive features including a rounded tip of the retrolateral tibial apophysis with a small tubercle near the tip. The retrolateral side of the tibia is covered with small tubercles, each bearing a hair.

== Taxonomy ==
The species was first described by André Comellini in 1959 based on a male holotype from Moçamedes, Angola. It was later revised by Dippenaar-Schoeman in 1983, who provided additional morphological details and comparisons with related species.

Thomisus machadoi is closely related to Thomisus congoensis but can be distinguished by the larger tubercles on the retrolateral tibial apophysis and differences in body setation.

== Conservation ==
The species is classified as Least Concern due to its wide geographical range across southern Africa. It has been recorded in several protected areas including Vaalbos National Park, Tswalu Nature Reserve, and Blouberg Nature Reserve.
