= Thomisus granulifrons =

Scientific classification
- Kingdom: Animalia
- Phylum: Arthropoda
- Subphylum: Chelicerata
- Class: Arachnida
- Order: Araneae
- Infraorder: Araneomorphae
- Family: Thomisidae
- Genus: Thomisus
- Species: T. granulifrons

Binomial name
- Thomisus granulifrons Simon, 1906

Species of spider

Thomisus granulifrons is a species of spiders of the genus Thomisus. It is native to India and Sri Lanka.
