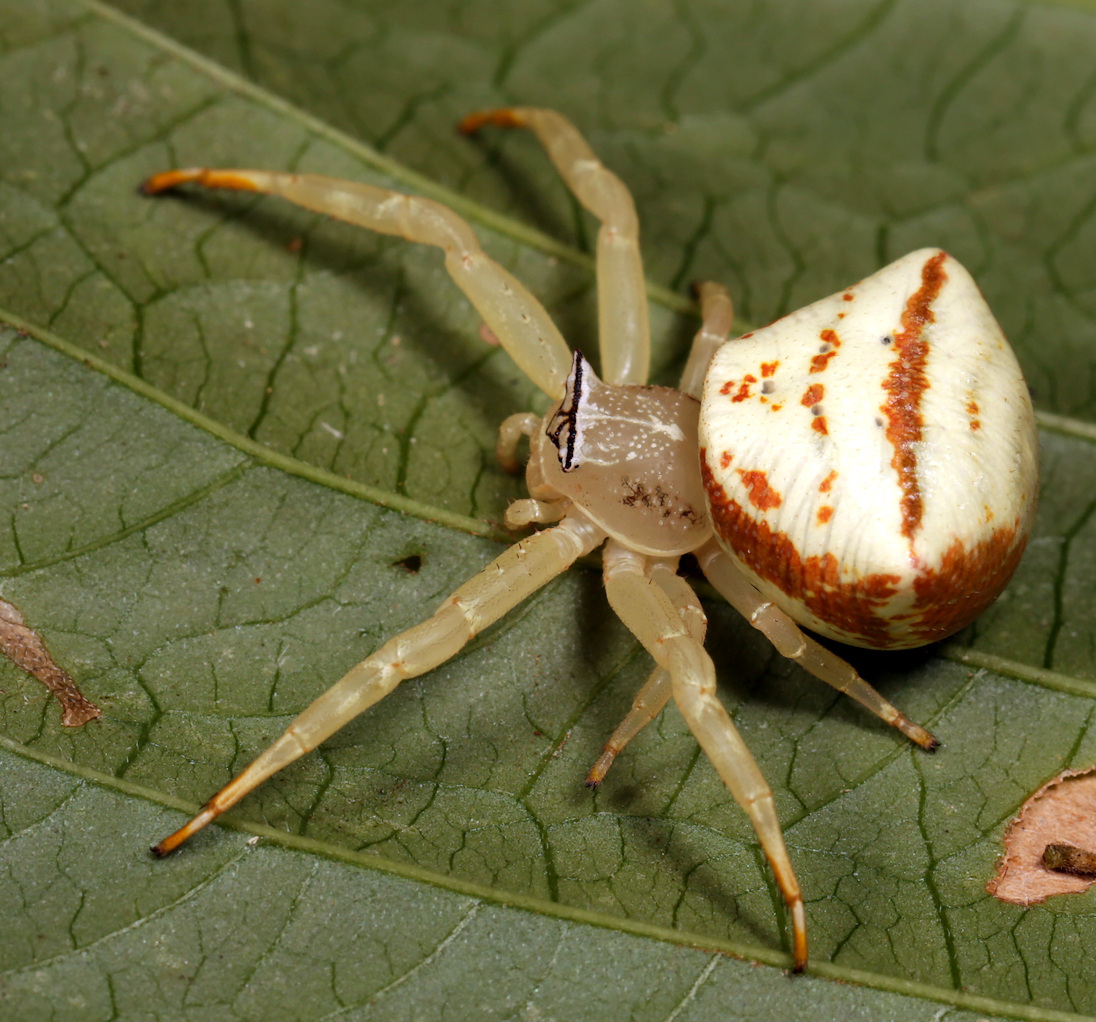
- Female from South Africa
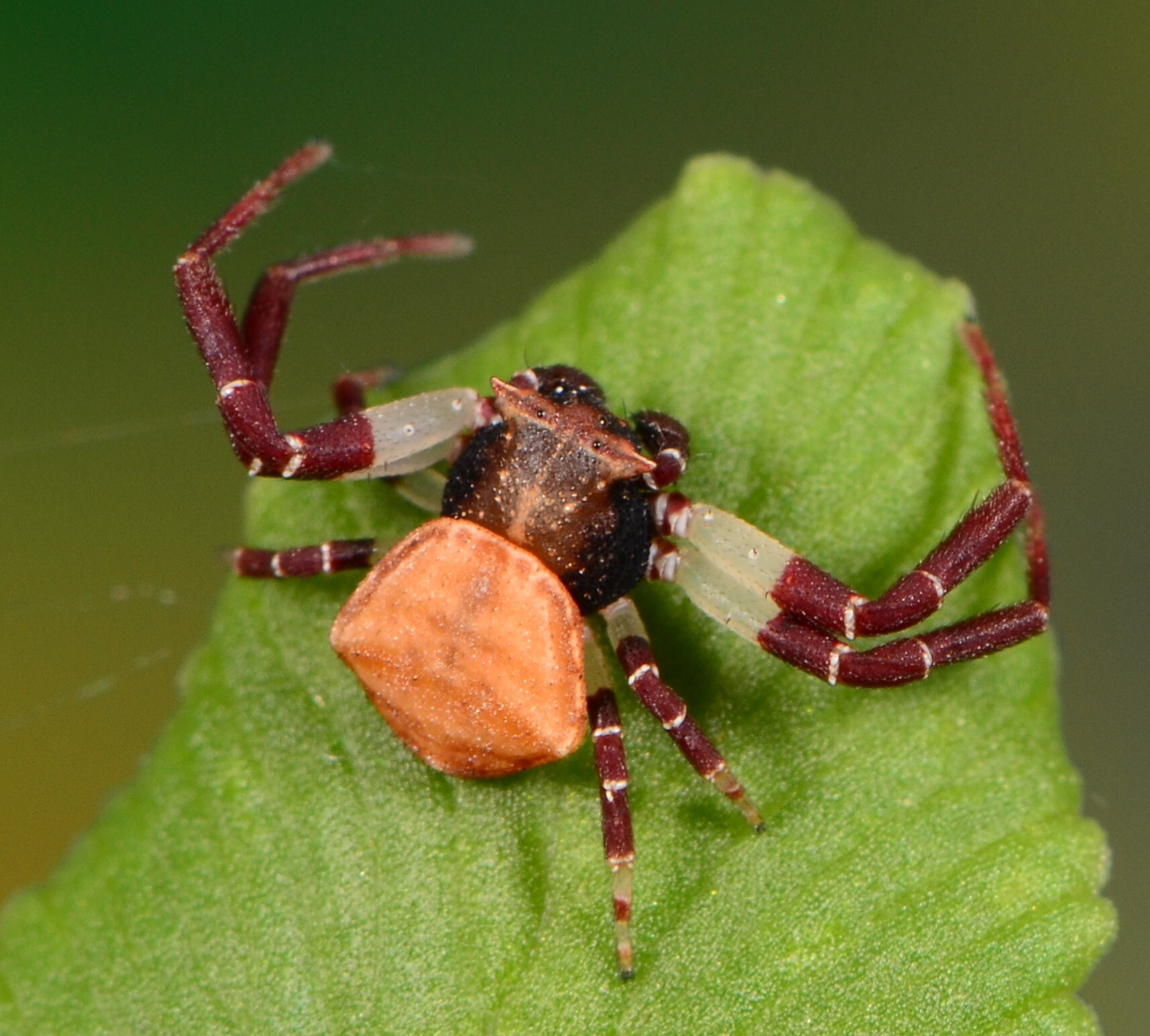
- Male

Scientific classification
- Kingdom: Animalia
- Phylum: Arthropoda
- Subphylum: Chelicerata
- Class: Arachnida
- Order: Araneae
- Infraorder: Araneomorphae
- Family: Thomisidae
- Genus: Thomisus
- Species: T. blandus

Binomial name
- Thomisus blandus Karsch, 1880

Synonyms
- Thomisus anthobius Pocock, 1898; Thomisus alboirroratus Simon, 1907; Thomisus malevolus O. Pickard-Cambridge, 1908; Thomisus chubbi Lessert, 1919; Thomisus sus Strand, 1907

= Thomisus blandus =

Masked crab spider

Species of crab spider

Thomisus blandus is a species of crab spider in the family Thomisidae. It is commonly known as the masked crab spider due to the distinctive dark triangular pattern between the anterior eyes of females. The species is widely distributed across sub-Saharan Africa and Yemen.

== Taxonomy ==
Thomisus blandus was first described by German arachnologist Ferdinand Karsch in 1880 based on a male specimen from South Africa, though no exact locality was provided. The female was described 18 years later by Reginald Innes Pocock in 1898 as Thomisus anthobius from Estcourt, KwaZulu-Natal.

Several similar species were described from various African countries over the following decades. In 1983, Ansie Dippenaar-Schoeman conducted a comprehensive revision of southern African Thomisus species and synonymized five taxa with T. blandus: T. anthobius Pocock, 1898, T. alboirroratus Simon, 1907, T. malevolus O. Pickard-Cambridge, 1908, T. chubbi Lessert, 1919, and T. sus Strand, 1907.

== Distribution ==
Thomisus blandus has been recorded from numerous countries across sub-Saharan Africa: South Africa (Natal and Cape Province), Guinea-Bissau, Zaïre, Mozambique, Zambia, Tanzania, Sudan, Ethiopia, Kenya, Zimbabwe, Ivory Coast, Togo, and Somalia. The species also occurs in Yemen.

In South Africa, the species is widely distributed and has been recorded from multiple provinces. It occurs in the Fynbos, Grassland, and Savanna biomes but is largely absent from arid regions.

== Habitat ==
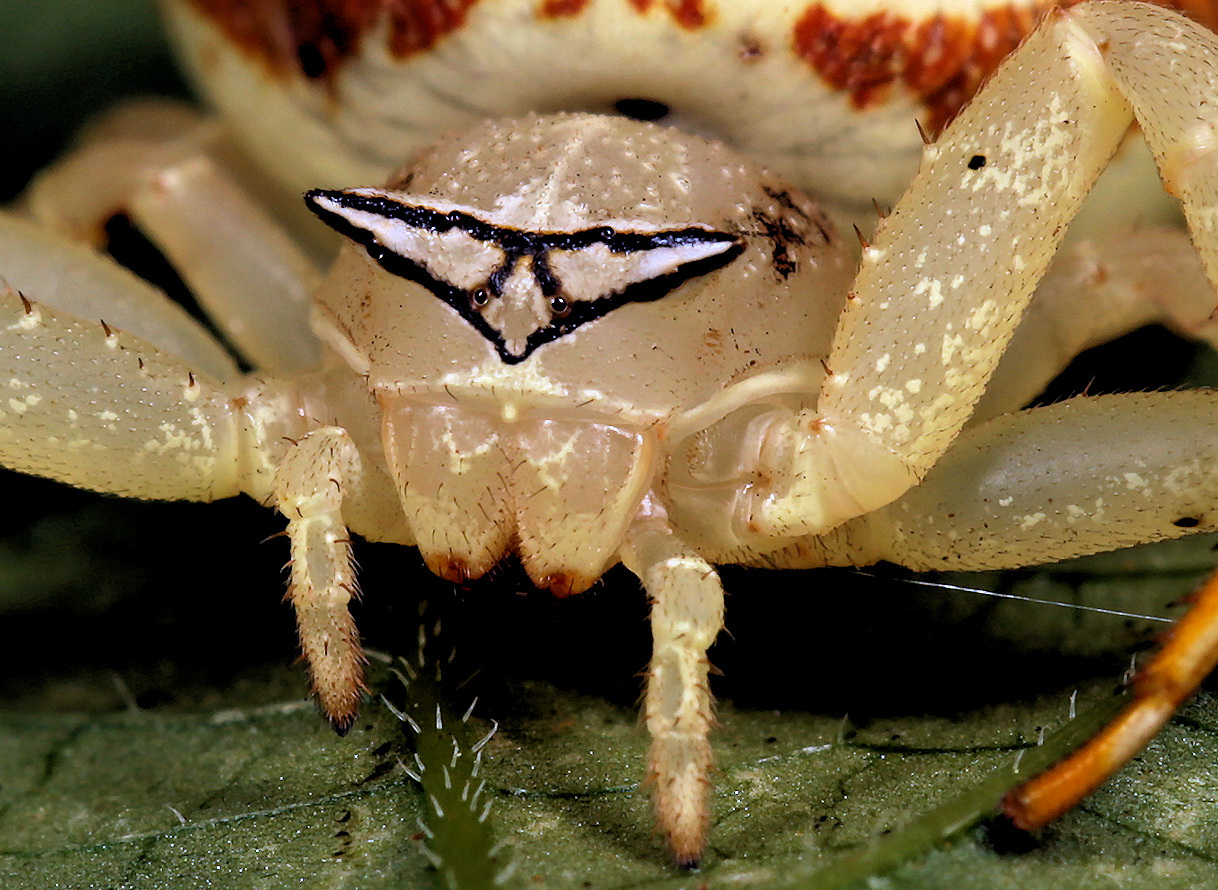
frontal view of female

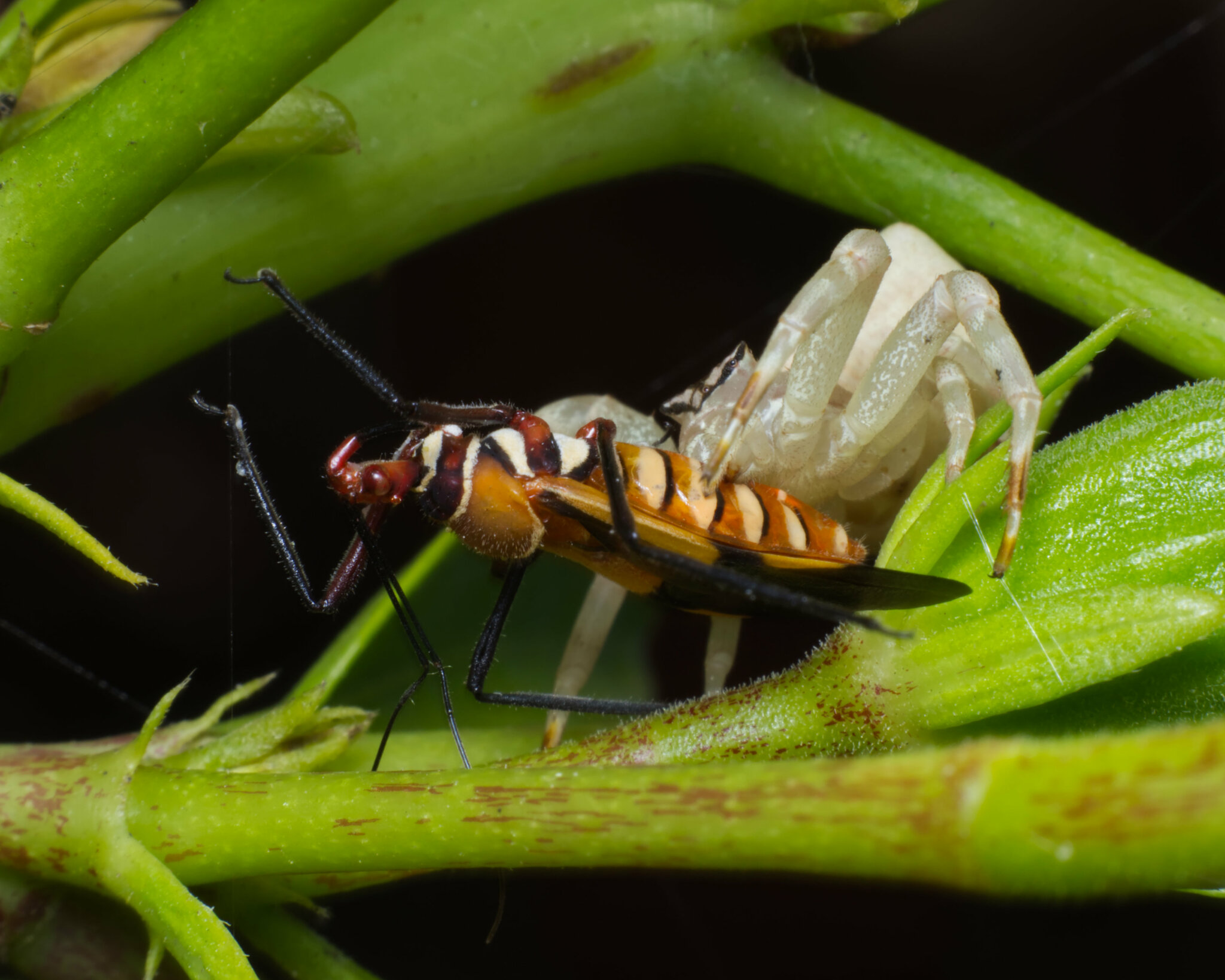
with prey

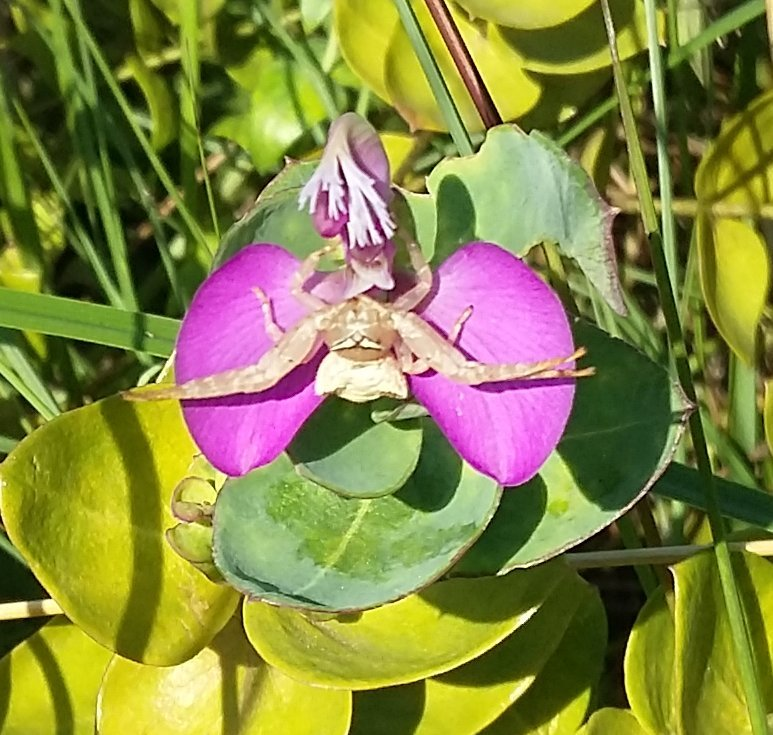
on flower

Thomisus blandus inhabits a variety of vegetation types, being found on trees, grass, herbs, and flowers. The species has also been recorded from agricultural ecosystems including citrus groves, cotton fields, maize crops, papaya plantations, pumpkin patches, and strawberry farms. As ambush predators, they position themselves on flowers and other vegetation to await prey.

== Description ==
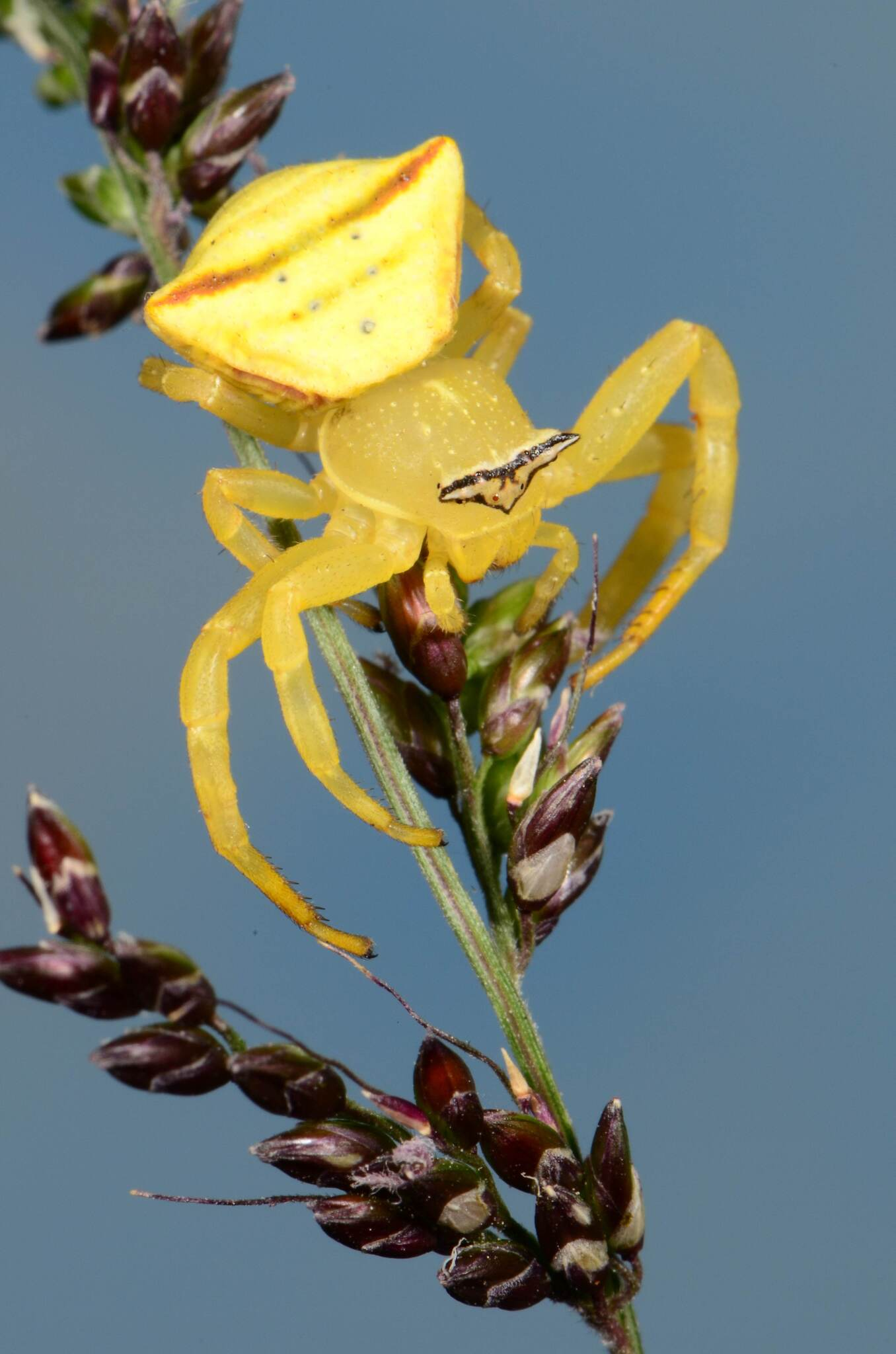
female

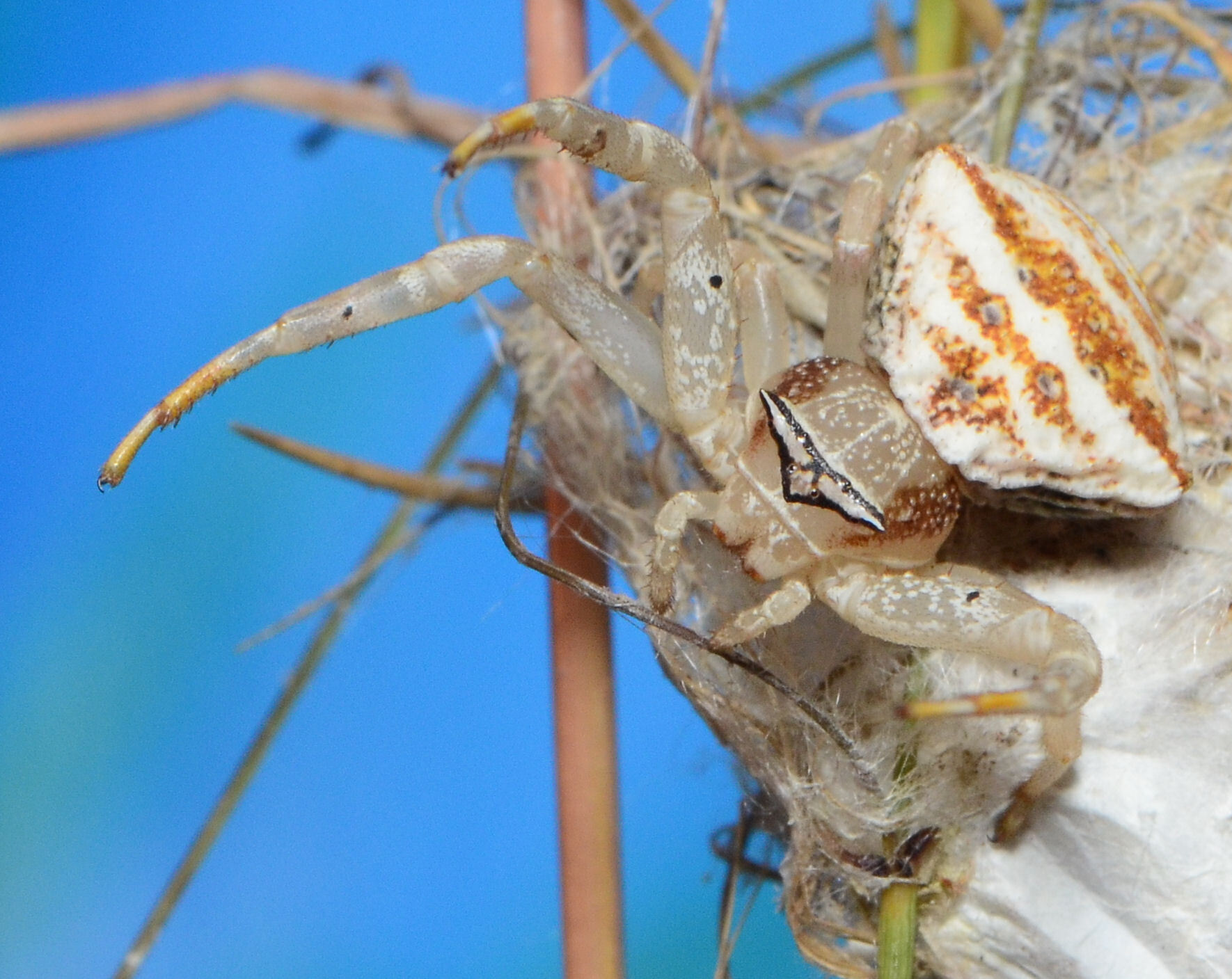
female

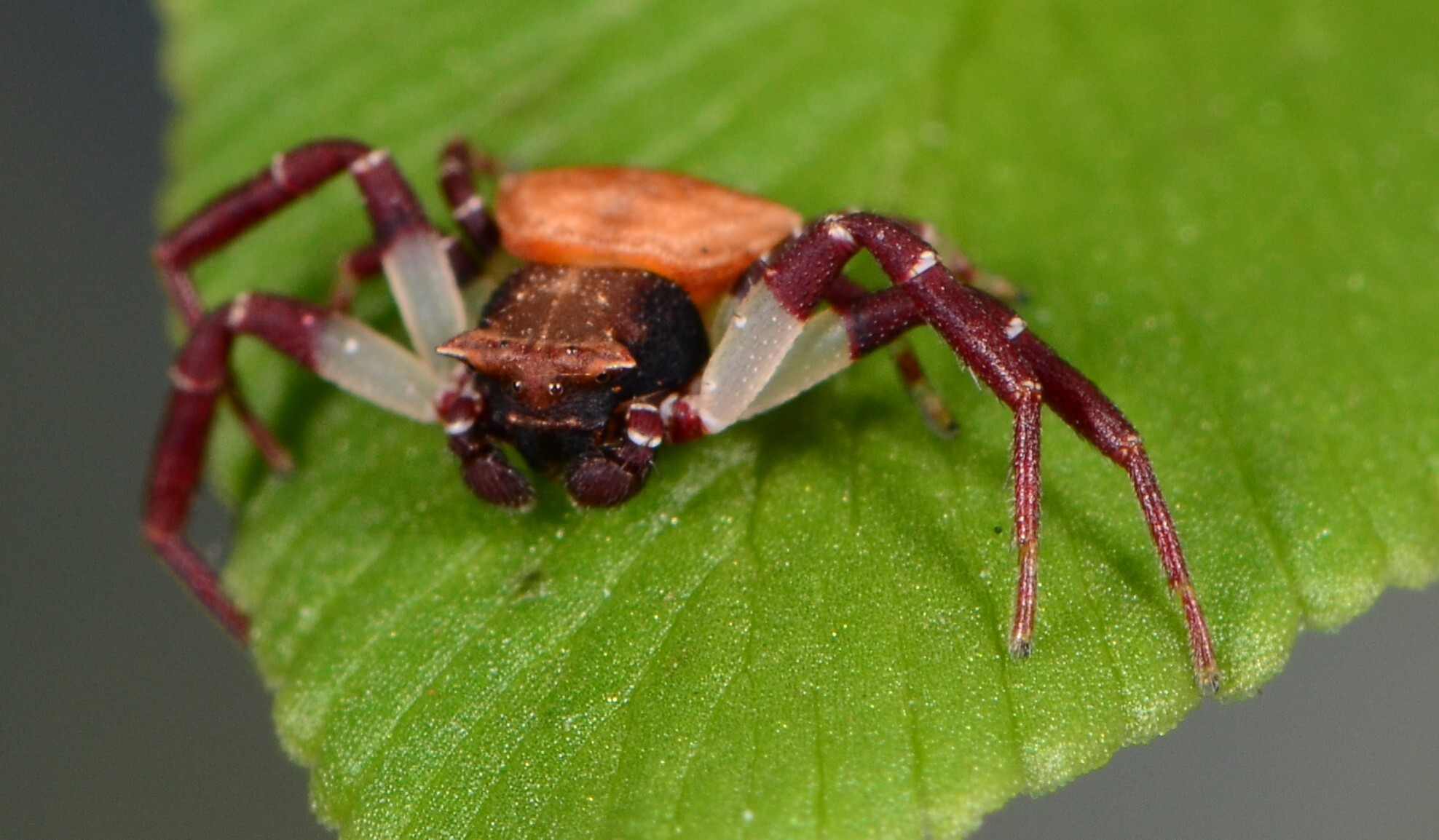
male

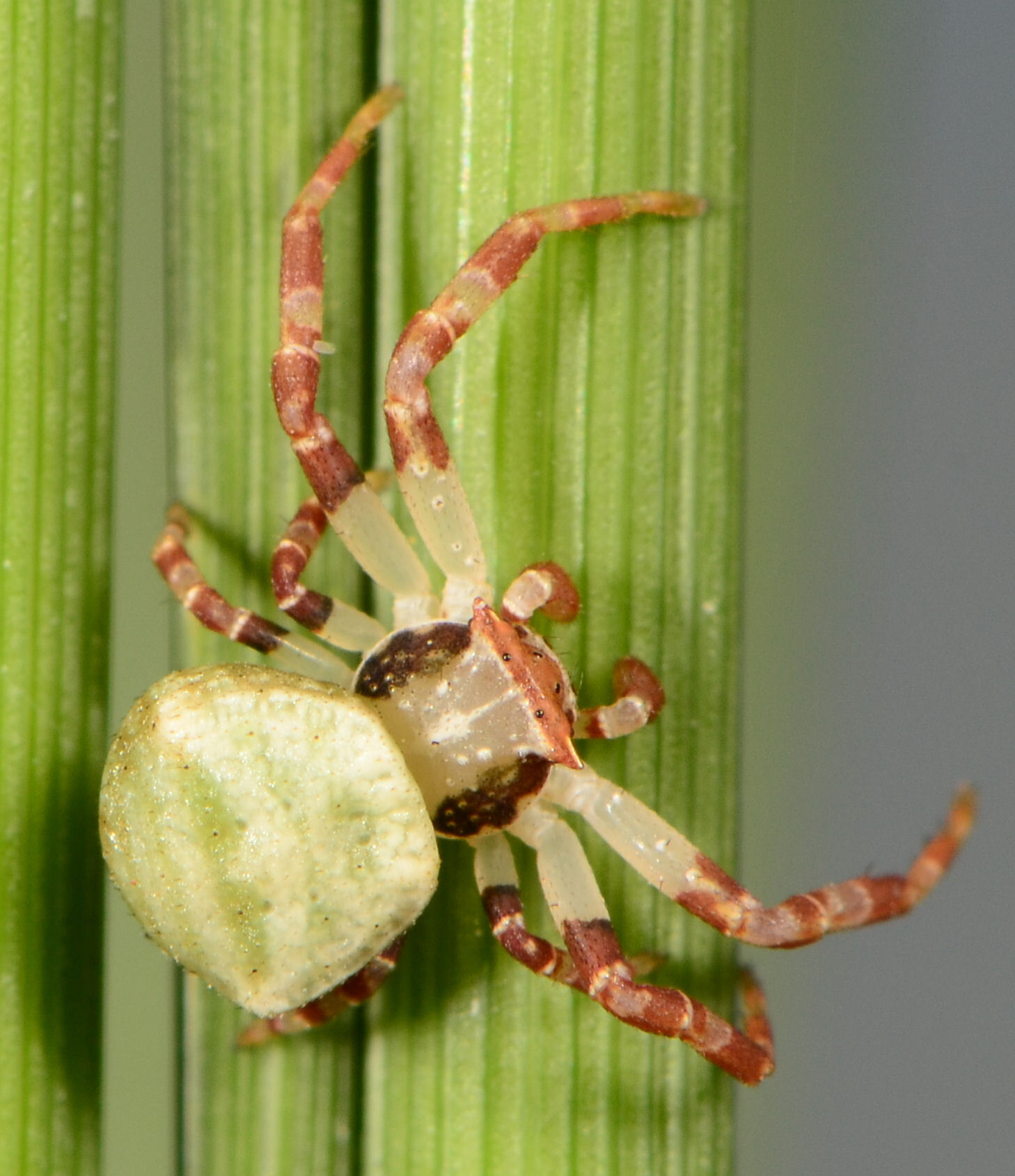
juvenile

Thomisus blandus exhibits pronounced sexual dimorphism in both size and coloration.

=== Females ===
Females are significantly larger than males, measuring 8.1–10.9 mm in total length with a cephalothorax length of 3.6–4.7 mm. The cephalothorax varies from translucent white to fawn or yellow in living specimens, often with two broad brown mediolateral lines. The clypeus region may be suffused with white. A distinctive dark triangular pattern occurs between the anterior eyes, which gives the species its common name of "masked crab spider". The opisthosoma is typically white with a transverse brown band across the widest part, though considerable color variation exists between individuals. The legs are generally fawn-colored with variable markings, and the femora and tibiae often bear black spots.

The eye arrangement consists of two slightly recurved rows. The anterior lateral eyes are larger than the anterior median eyes, while the posterior eyes are equal in size.

=== Males ===
Males are much smaller, measuring 2.6–3.6 mm in total length with a cephalothorax length of 1.3–1.8 mm. The cephalothorax is dark brown with mediolateral lines that are darker than the background. The opisthosoma ranges from yellow to orange-brown. The legs are brown except for the basal portions of all femora, which are cream-colored, and the joints between leg segments are white. The metatarsi and tarsi of legs III and IV are banded with white.

The male pedipalps bear a distinctive large retrolateral tibial apophysis, and the tibia has numerous scattered tubercles bearing setae.

=== Juveniles ===
Juveniles display a triangular pattern between the anterior eyes similar to adults, though paler in color. The cephalothorax shows distinct mediolateral lines, and the body is cream-colored with a triangular opisthosoma.

== Behaviour ==
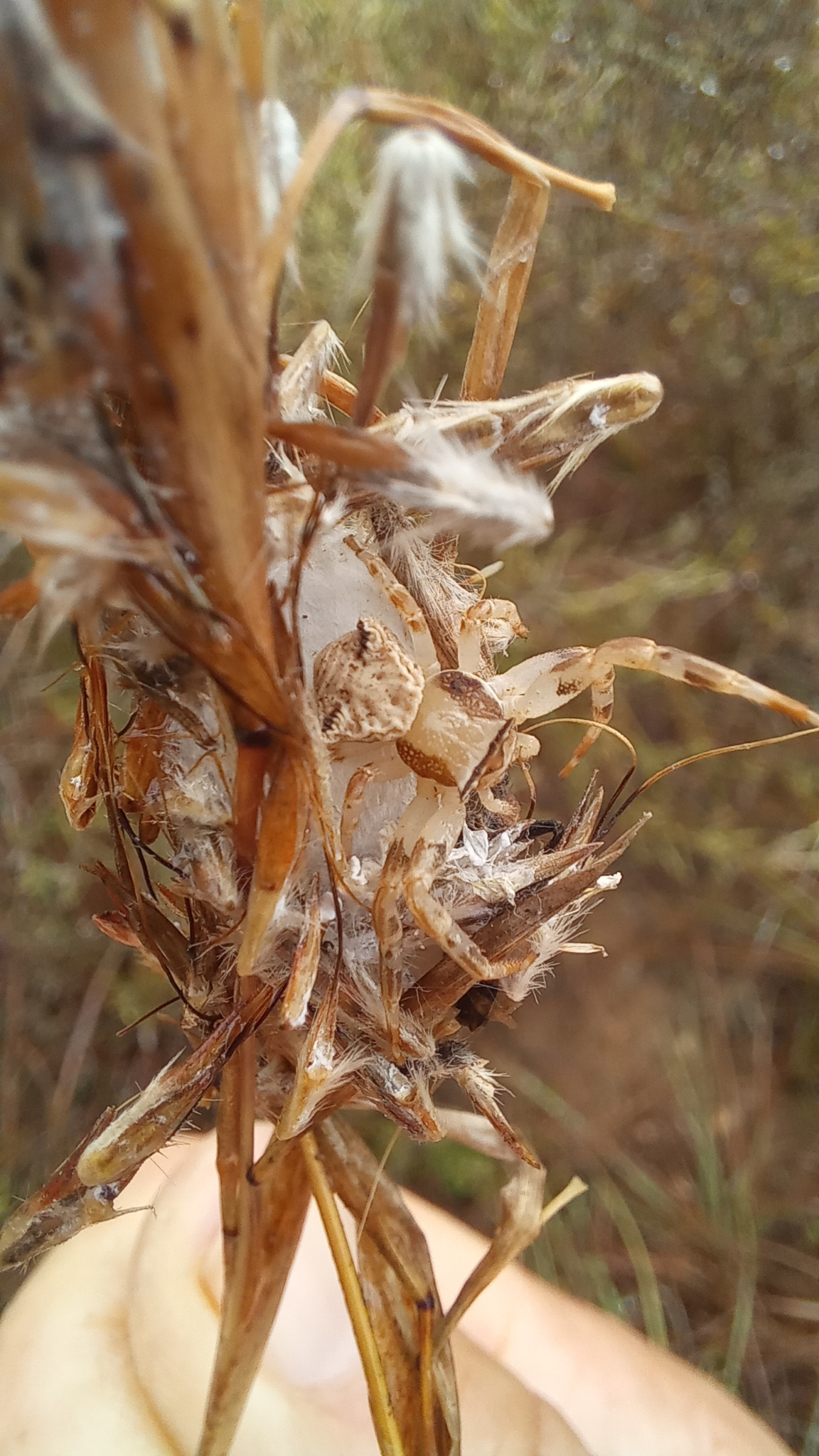
female in grass

Like many crab spiders, Thomisus blandus are ambush predators that wait motionlessly on flowers or vegetation for prey to approach. They use their strong front legs, which bear rows of spines, to capture prey with lightning-fast strikes when insects come within 0.5–1.0 cm range. Despite having relatively weak chelicerae, they produce potent venom that can immobilize prey up to four times their own size.

The species exhibits marked sexual dimorphism in behavior as well as morphology. Males mature before females and cease feeding to spend their time searching for mates. Females construct egg sacs covered with layers of silk, which they place between plants and guard until the eggs hatch.

Adults can be found throughout the year in South Africa, indicating continuous reproduction.

== Conservation ==
Thomisus blandus has been recorded from several protected areas in South Africa, including Addo Elephant National Park, Mountain Zebra National Park, Marakele National Park, and Garden Route National Park, as well as numerous provincial nature reserves. The wide distribution and adaptability to various habitats, including agricultural areas, suggests the species is not currently at conservation risk.
