= Thomisus socotrensis =

Scientific classification
- Kingdom: Animalia
- Phylum: Arthropoda
- Subphylum: Chelicerata
- Class: Arachnida
- Order: Araneae
- Infraorder: Araneomorphae
- Family: Thomisidae
- Genus: Thomisus
- Species: T. socotrensis

Binomial name
- Thomisus socotrensis Dippenaar-Schoeman & van Harten, 2007

Species of crab spider

Thomisus socotrensis is a species of crab spider in the family Thomisidae. It is endemic to Socotra, an island in the Arabian Sea belonging to Yemen.

== Etymology ==
The species is named after Socotra, the island where it was discovered and remains endemic.

== Distribution ==
Thomisus socotrensis is known only from Socotra Island, Yemen. The species has been recorded from multiple locations across the island including the Hadibo Plain, Jo'oh, Deksam Plateau, and Muomi.

== Description ==
Thomisus socotrensis is a small crab spider with distinctive tubercles covering its body. Both males and females have numerous small tubercles, each bearing a spine-like hair (seta).

=== Female ===
Females are larger than males, with a cephalothorax length of approximately 2.2 mm and total length of 5.2 mm. In life, the carapace appears translucent with a faint white triangular pattern around the eye area and a pale white rim around the edge. The opisthosoma is white with two dark spots on the abdominal tubercle. The median area of the carapace has numerous small white-tipped tubercles, each bearing a spine-like seta. The eye arrangement consists of anterior eyes of equal size in a recurved row, and posterior eyes also equal in size in a slightly recurved row.

The epigyne shows the spermathecae as two darker areas visible from the outside, with small, oval, sclerotized openings situated dorsally.

=== Male ===
Males are considerably smaller, with cephalothorax length ranging from 1.0-1.4 mm and total length from 2.1-2.8 mm. The carapace is yellowish-brown with dark brown lateral bands, while the median area, eye region and clypeus are paler and suffused with white. Like females, males have distinct white tubercles arranged in short rows behind the eyes, each bearing a strong seta. The abdomen is white with a yellowish tint and guanine spots. The legs are brown, with legs I and II darker than III and IV.

The male pedipalp is relatively small with a long, slender embolus and a long retrolateral tibial apophysis that reaches the upper part of the cymbium.
