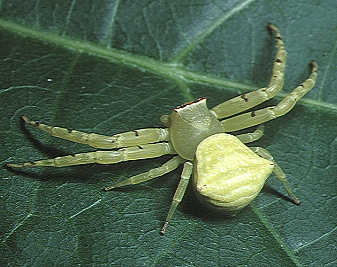
- female from Okinawa
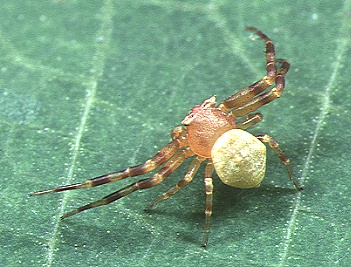
- male from Okinawa

Scientific classification
- Kingdom: Animalia
- Phylum: Arthropoda
- Subphylum: Chelicerata
- Class: Arachnida
- Order: Araneae
- Infraorder: Araneomorphae
- Family: Thomisidae
- Genus: Thomisus
- Species: T. okinawensis

Binomial name
- Thomisus okinawensis Strand, 1907

Synonyms
- Thomisus formosae Strand, 1907; Thomisus picaceus Simon, 1909; Thomisus formosanus Bonnet, 1957

= Thomisus okinawensis =

Species of spider

Thomisus okinawensis is a species of crab spider in the family Thomisidae. It is widely distributed across Asia, ranging from Thailand to Japan (including the Ryukyu Islands), and has also been recorded from the Philippines and Indonesia.

== Taxonomy ==
The species was first described by Embrik Strand in 1907 from specimens collected in Okinawa. Several other species have since been synonymized with T. okinawensis, including Thomisus formosae Strand, 1907, Thomisus picaceus Simon, 1909, and Thomisus formosanus Bonnet, 1957.

== Distribution ==
T. okinawensis has a wide distribution across Asia. It occurs from Thailand northward to Japan (particularly the Ryukyu Islands), and southward through the Philippines and Indonesia.

== Habitat ==
The species is commonly found in agricultural habitats, particularly rice fields, where it has been collected from rice, mungbean, soybean, and maize crops. Males can be found almost year-round, with collection records spanning from January to October.

== Description ==
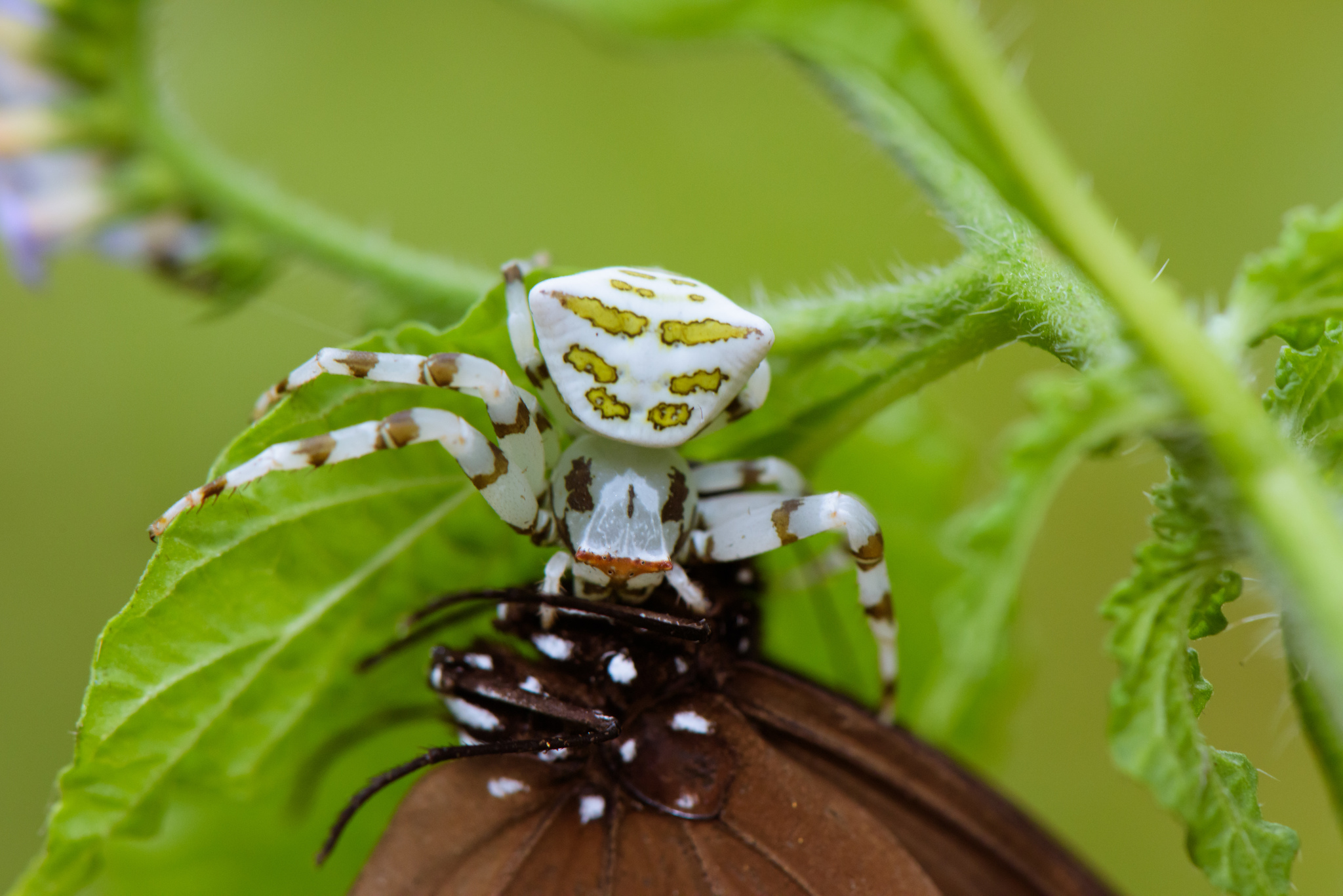
female feeding on moth

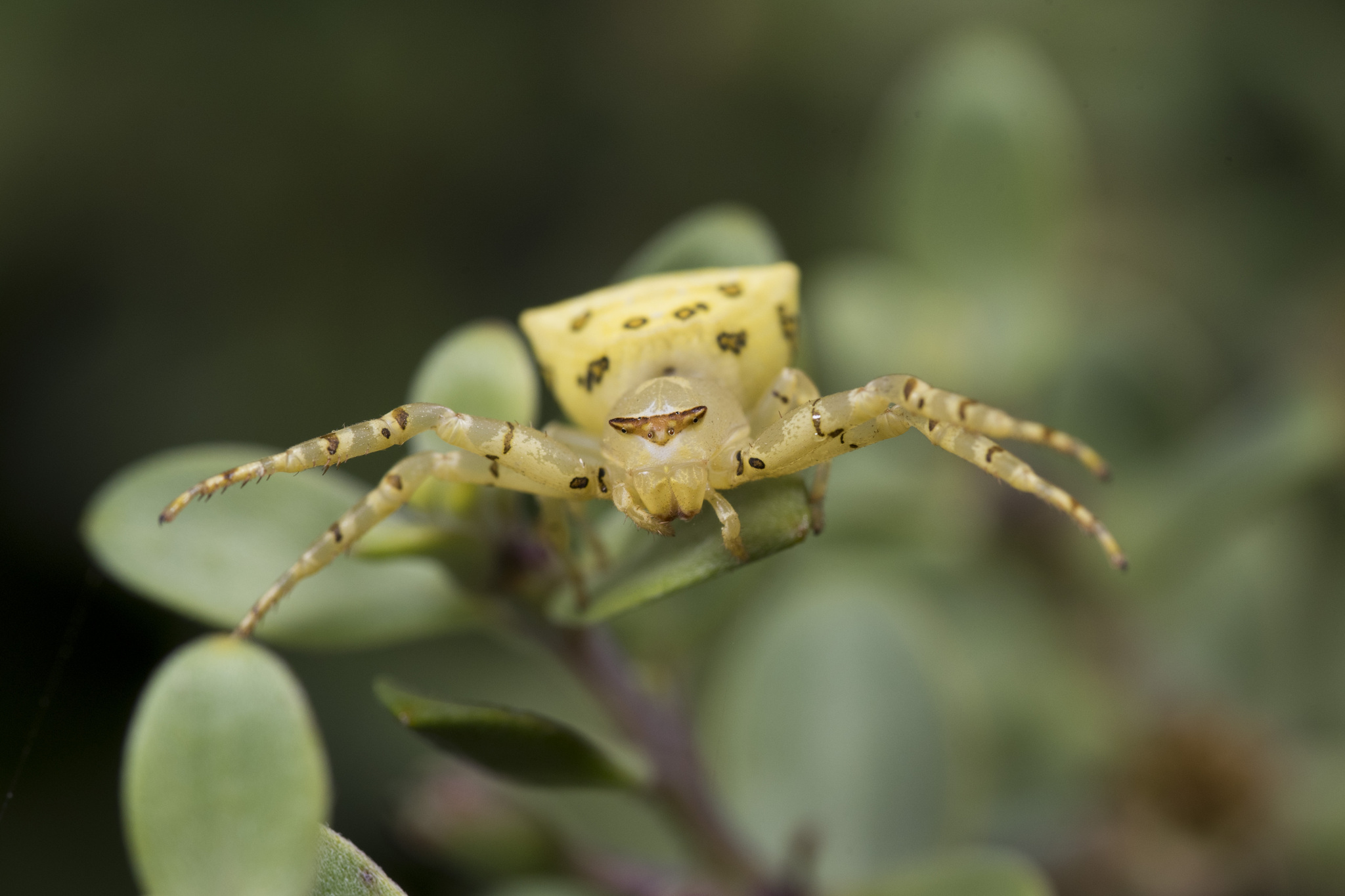
from Taiwan

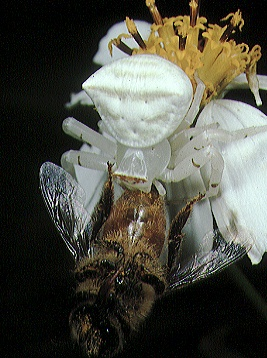
female feeding on bee

Thomisus okinawensis exhibits significant sexual dimorphism, with females being much larger than males.

Males have a total length of approximately 3.3 mm, with a yellowish-brown cephalothorax featuring a distinctive white transverse ridge in the eye region that forms lateral tubercles. The legs are light brown to yellowish-brown with dark brown banding patterns on various segments. The abdomen is yellowish-brown with pale brown spots and transverse striations.

Females are considerably larger, reaching up to 10.4 mm in total length. They have a yellowish-brown cephalothorax with a distinctive V-shaped white band and white markings in the eye region. The legs show yellowish-brown coloration with white patches on various segments. The abdomen is typically white with five spherical brown spots and a pair of lateral tubercles. The epigynum appears as a simple sclerotized black plate.
