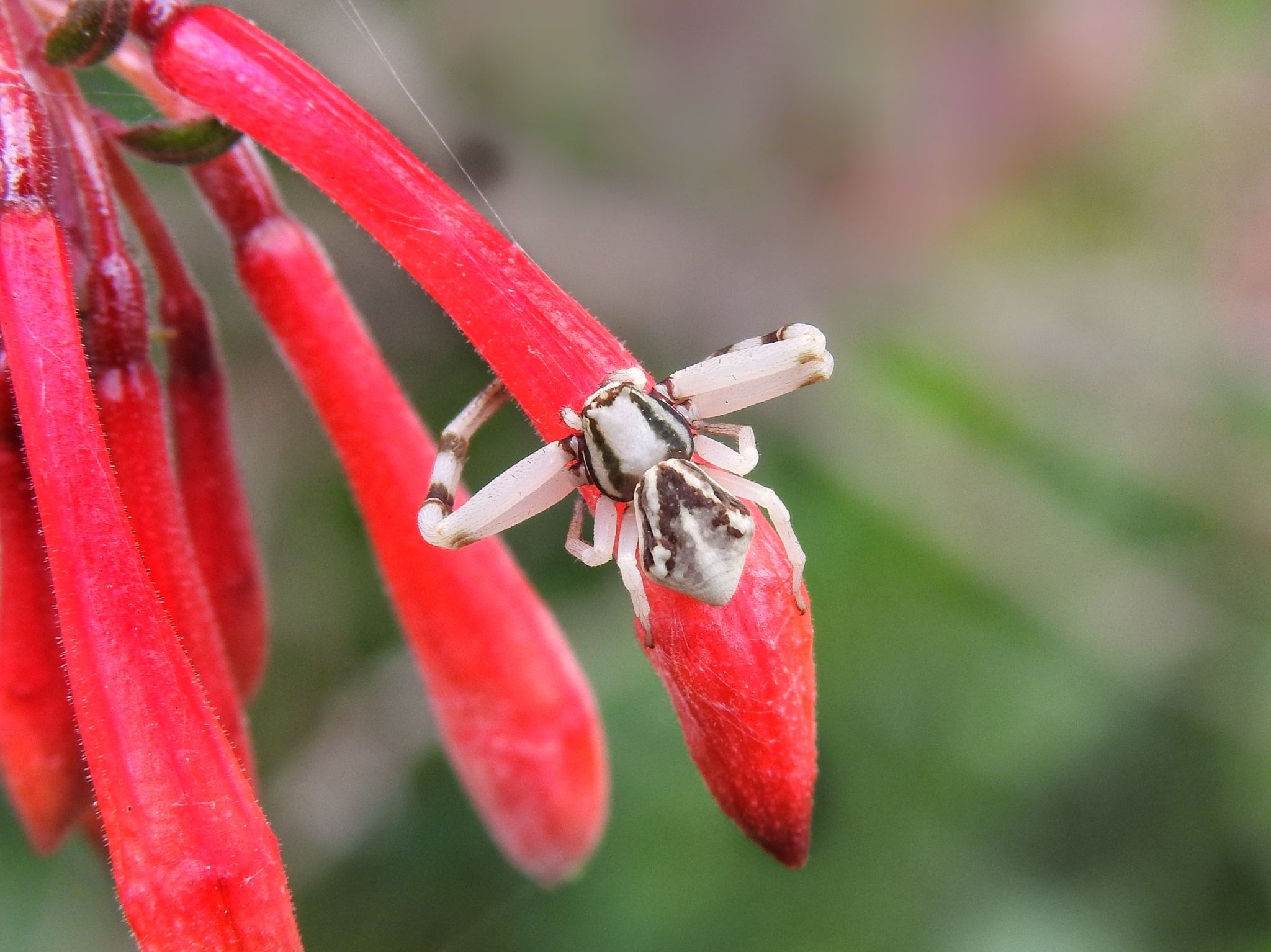
- female from Ecuador
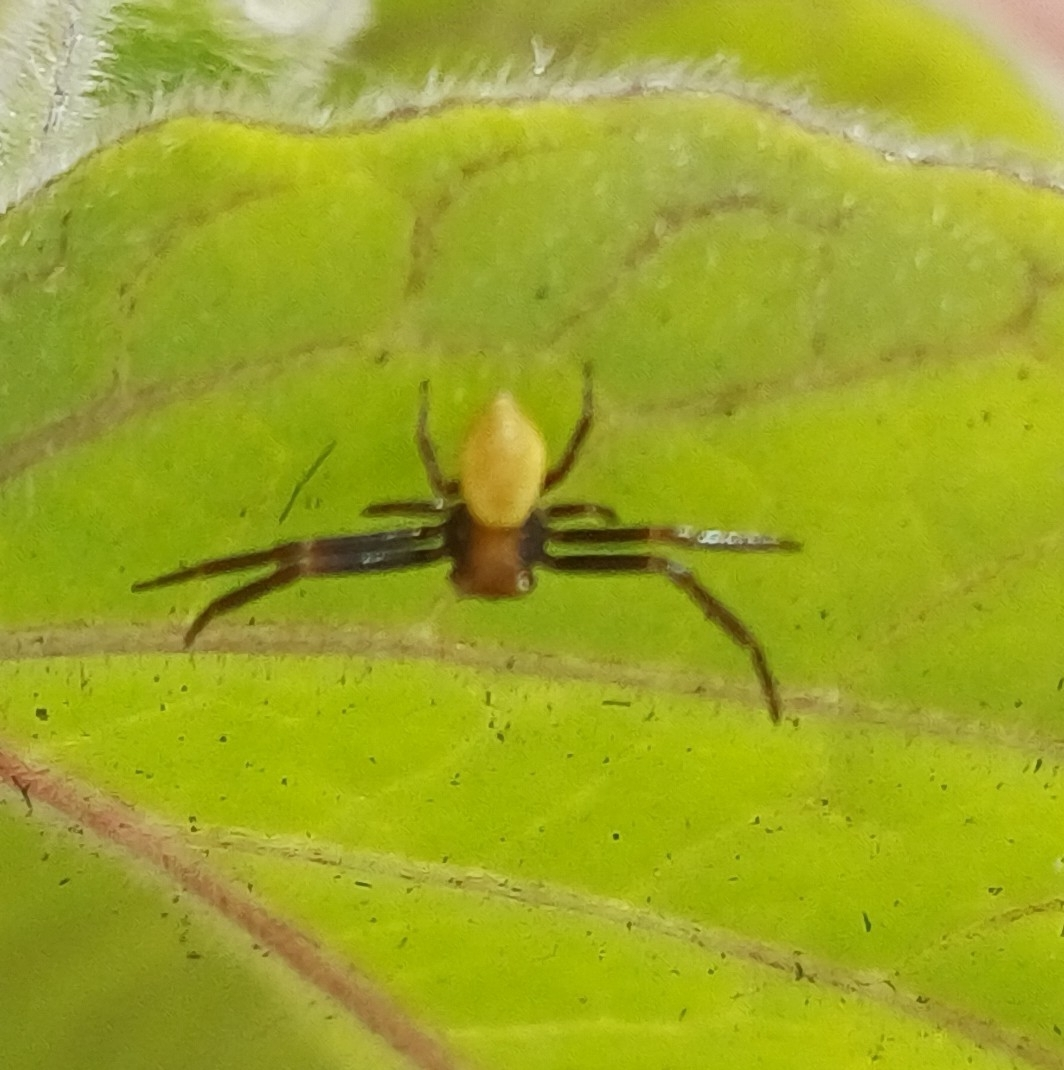
- male from Peru

Scientific classification
- Kingdom: Animalia
- Phylum: Arthropoda
- Subphylum: Chelicerata
- Class: Arachnida
- Order: Araneae
- Infraorder: Araneomorphae
- Family: Thomisidae
- Genus: Thomisus
- Species: T. guadahyrensis

Binomial name
- Thomisus guadahyrensis Keyserling, 1880

= Thomisus guadahyrensis =

Species of spider

Thomisus guadahyrensis is a species of crab spider in the genus Thomisus. It is endemic to Peru and represents the only native New World species in the genus Thomisus.

== Etymology ==
The species name refers to "Guadahyra" in Peru, one of the type locations.

== Taxonomy ==
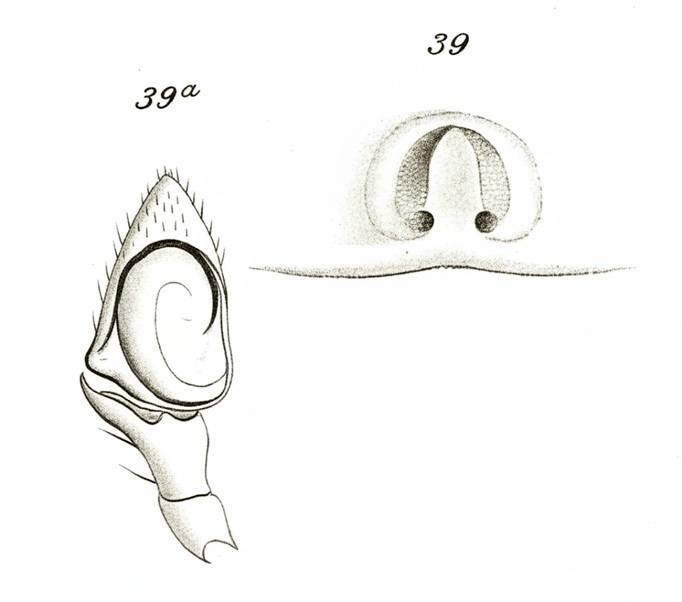
Palp and epigyne from Keyserling 1880

The species was first described by Eugen von Keyserling in 1880 in his work "Die Spinnen Amerikas. Laterigradae". Keyserling provided detailed measurements and a description of both male and female specimens, along with illustrations of the epigyne and pedipalp.

Thomisus guadahyrensis is notable for being geographically isolated from other Thomisus species, which are primarily found in the Old World. This isolation has led to suggestions that it may eventually warrant placement in a distinct genus, as comprehensive revisions of the genus Thomisus have indicated that many species currently assigned to it likely belong to separate genera.

== Distribution ==
Thomisus guadahyrensis has been recorded from Peru, specifically from »Guadahyra and San Malu at an elevation of 10,000 feet« (approximately 3,000 meters). The type specimens were deposited in the collection of the University of Warsaw.

== Description ==
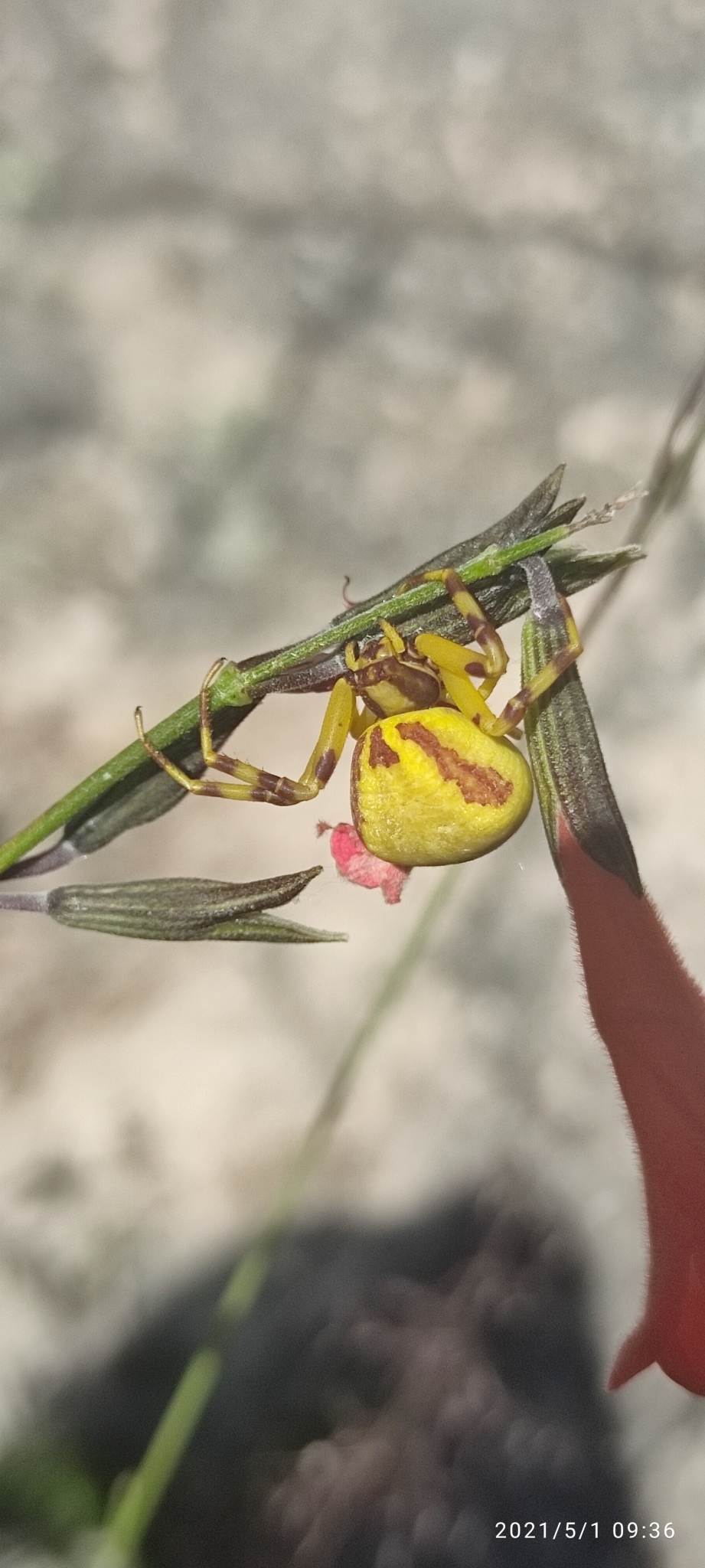
Female on plant in Peru

Like in many crab spider species, females are significantly larger than males, with a total length of 8.3 mm compared to 2.3 mm in males. The cephalothorax measures 3.1 mm in length and width in females, while the opisthosoma reaches 6.3 mm in length and 6.0 mm in width.

A key identifying feature is the distinctive shape of the ocular region, which resembles that of other spiders in the genus Thomisus. The species can be distinguished from other crab spiders by this characteristic eye arrangement and its unique geographical distribution.

=== Females ===
The cephalothorax displays distinctive coloration with reddish sides, particularly dark at the front, and lighter coloration at the rear. The area containing the median eyes and the forehead is also reddish, while the upper part shows large eye tubercles and a whitish stripe running from these tubercles to the forehead. The whitish chelicerae are entirely reddish on the inner surface, and the red-bordered maxillae, lips, sternum, pedipalps, and legs are dark yellow.

The front pairs of legs are somewhat lighter than the rear pairs, with reddish coloration at the end of the metatarsi, tip, and beginning of the tibiae, as well as a reddish spot above the coxae. The light yellow opisthosoma features a small spot at the front center and is marked on each side with a long, curved narrow band of brown color with sharply defined contours.

=== Males ===
Males show different coloration patterns, with the cephalothorax displaying dark reddish-brown sides and a large triangular yellow spot that encompasses the eyes and ends in a point at the highest position at the back. The forehead, maxillae, lips, and sternum are reddish-yellow, while the chelicerae, pedipalps, and legs are reddish. The opisthosoma is entirely light yellow without special markings and is covered with short hairs.
