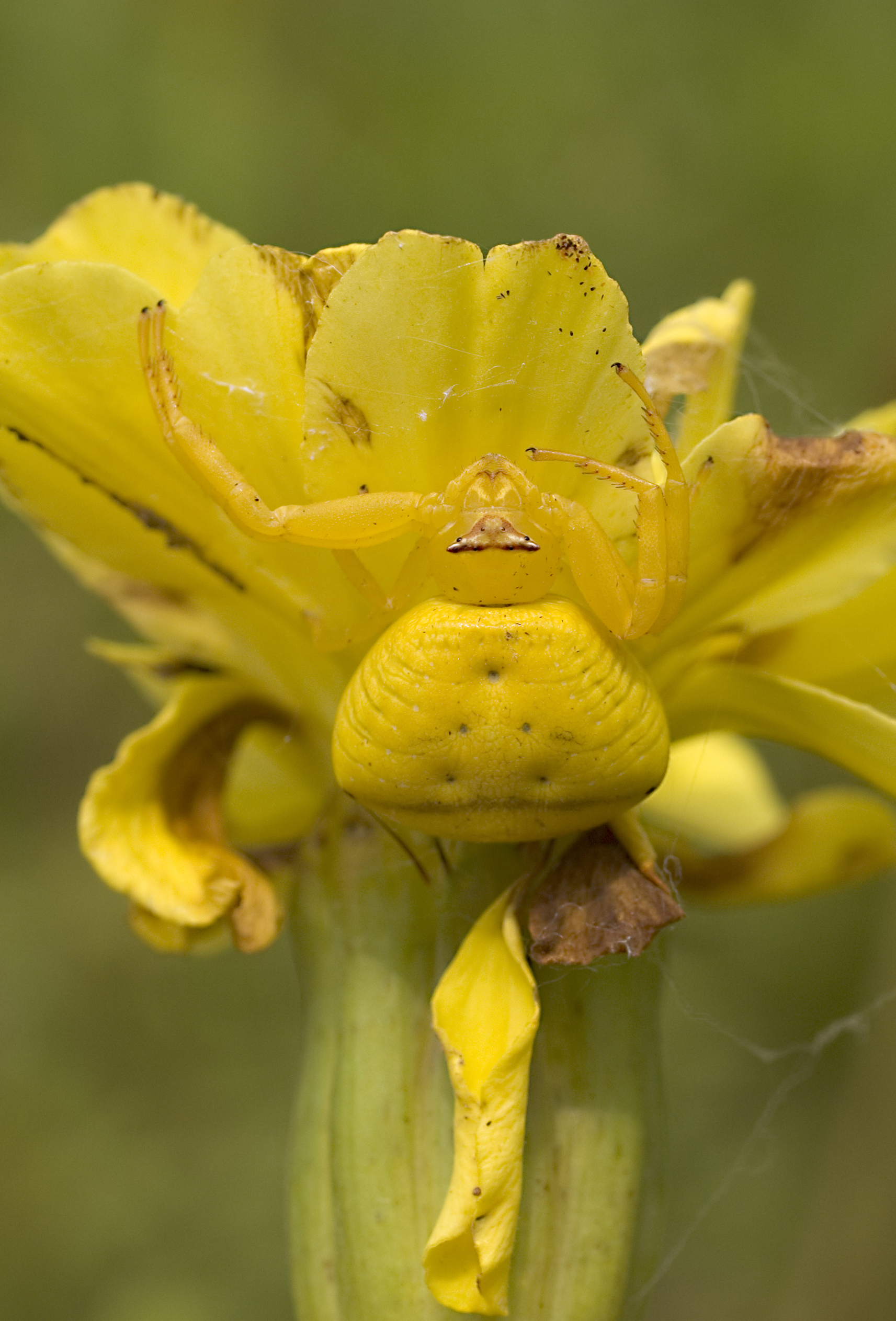
- female from Japan
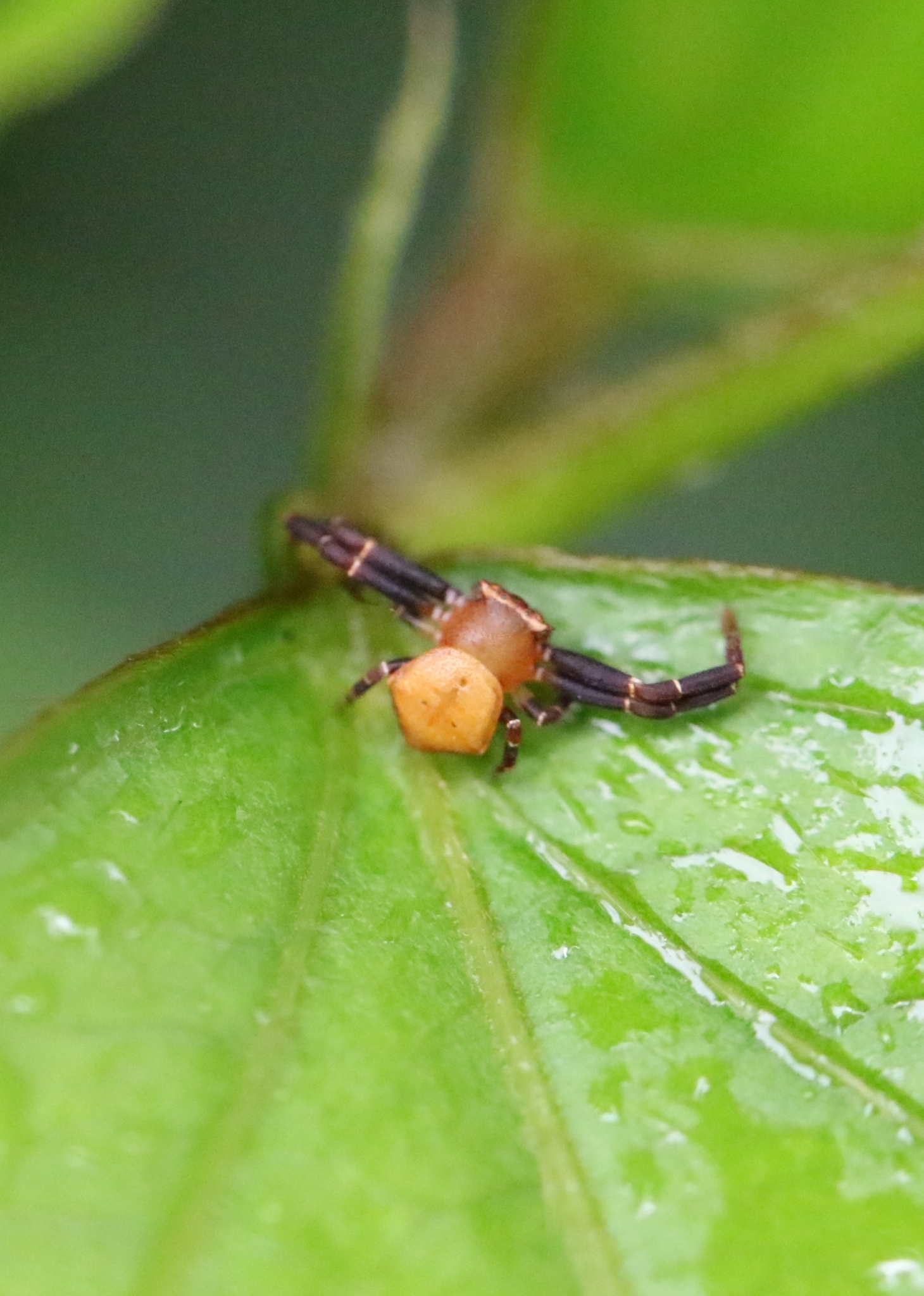
- male from Hong Kong

Scientific classification
- Kingdom: Animalia
- Phylum: Arthropoda
- Subphylum: Chelicerata
- Class: Arachnida
- Order: Araneae
- Infraorder: Araneomorphae
- Family: Thomisidae
- Genus: Thomisus
- Species: T. labefactus

Binomial name
- Thomisus labefactus Karsch, 1881

Synonyms
- Thomisus labefactus bimaculatus Bösenberg & Strand, 1906; Thomisus onustoides Bösenberg & Strand, 1906; Thomisus serrei Schenkel, 1963; Thomisus kiangsiensis Schenkel, 1963; Thomisus unicolor Schenkel, 1963

= Thomisus labefactus =

Species of spider

Thomisus labefactus is a species of crab spider in the family Thomisidae. It was first described by German arachnologist Ferdinand Karsch in 1881.

== Distribution ==
T. labefactus has been recorded from Korea, Japan, China, Taiwan, and Thailand. The species appears to be widely distributed across East and Southeast Asia.

== Taxonomy ==
The species has a complex taxonomic history with several synonyms. In 1906, Bösenberg and Strand described both T. labefactus bimaculatus and T. onustoides, which were later recognized as synonyms of T. labefactus. Additional synonyms were established by Schenkel in 1963, including T. serrei, T. kiangsiensis, and T. unicolor, all of which were later synonymized with T. labefactus by various authors in the 1980s.

== Description ==
Like other crab spiders, T. labefactus exhibits sexual dimorphism. Females can reach up to 9 mm in total length, while males are considerably smaller at approximately 6.3 mm. The species shows considerable color variation, with some individuals appearing yellowish-white with brown markings, while others may be more uniformly colored.

Females typically have a yellowish-white abdomen with distinctive brown muscle impressions arranged in the center of the upper half, and two rows of smaller similar markings along the outer edges. Mature specimens often display two deep black spots on the corners of the abdomen connected by a bluish streak. The legs are yellow with white markings, and the anterior legs (I and II) bear spines on the metatarsi and tibiae.

Males are much darker in coloration and less distinctively marked than females. The cephalothorax is reddish-brown with darker edges, and the abdomen lacks the prominent black corner spots found in females.

== Ecology ==
The species has been observed to be somewhat nomadic but constructs a protective nest when guarding eggs. Females create this nest by drawing together the edges of a leaf with irregularly spaced silk threads to form an enclosure around a shallow cocoon containing the eggs. The dedication to egg protection is notable, as females will not abandon their eggs regardless of disturbance. Young spiders, measuring approximately 2 mm in length, have been observed overwintering under bark.
