= Thomisus callidus =

Scientific classification
- Kingdom: Animalia
- Phylum: Arthropoda
- Subphylum: Chelicerata
- Class: Arachnida
- Order: Araneae
- Infraorder: Araneomorphae
- Family: Thomisidae
- Genus: Thomisus
- Species: T. callidus

Binomial name
- Thomisus callidus (Thorell, 1890)

Species of spider

Thomisus callidus, the yellow crab spider, is a species of spider of the genus Thomisus. It is found in Sri Lanka, Singapore, Sumatra, Nias Island, and Java. They often hide in flowers and are able to change colors just to blend in to capture prey.
