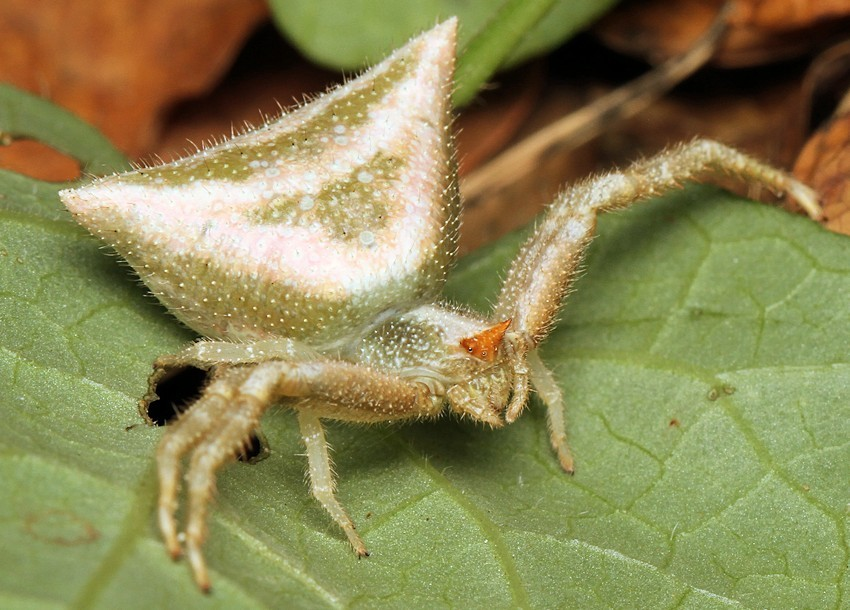
- Female T. granulatus from South Africa
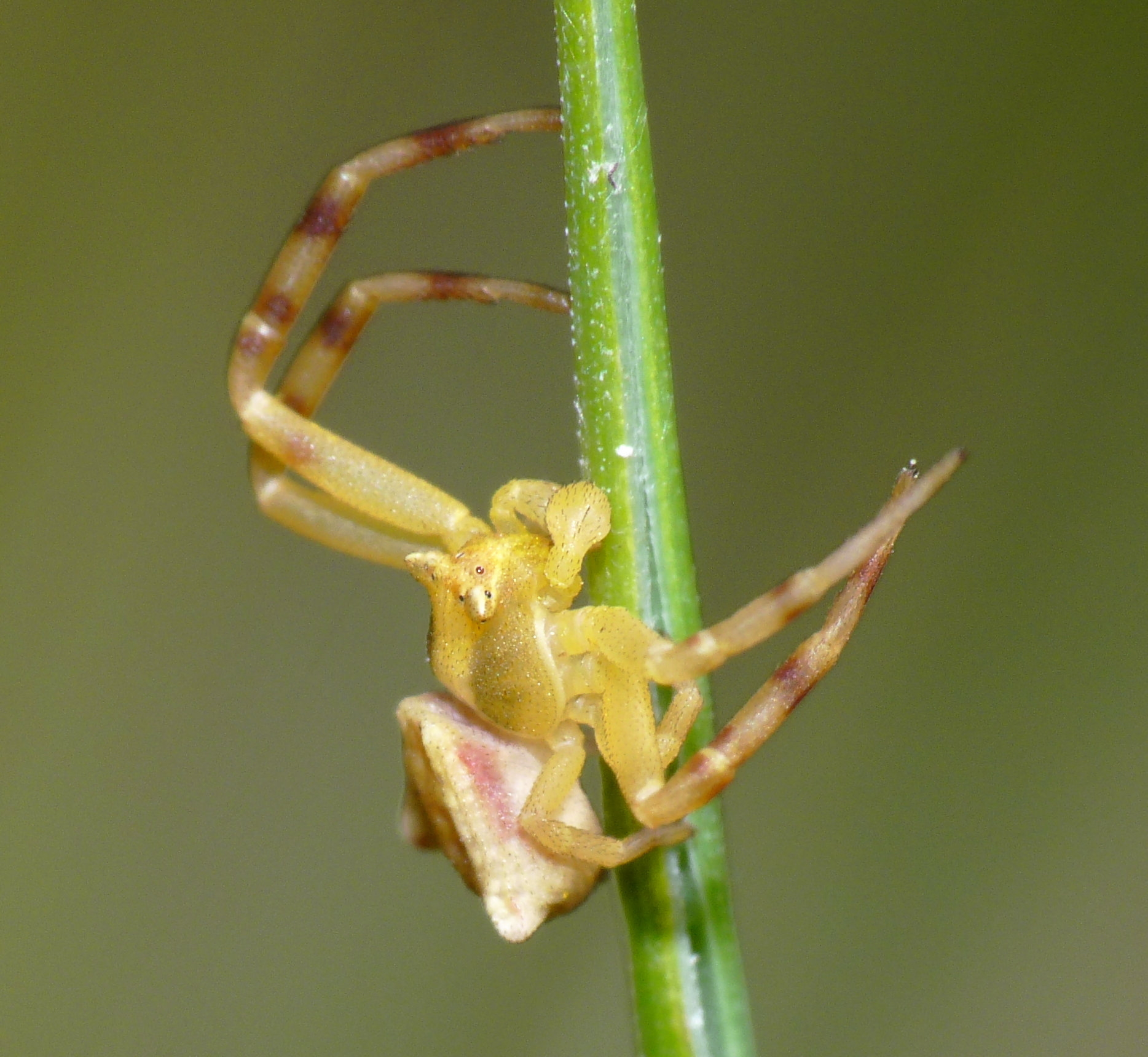
- Male T. onustus from Italy

Scientific classification
- Kingdom: Animalia
- Phylum: Arthropoda
- Subphylum: Chelicerata
- Class: Arachnida
- Order: Araneae
- Infraorder: Araneomorphae
- Family: Thomisidae
- Genus: Thomisus; Walckenaer, 1805

Type species
- Thomisus onustus Walckenaer, 1805

Species
- See text

Diversity
- 137 species

= Thomisus =

Thomisus Temporal range: Palaeogene–present

Genus of spiders

Thomisus is a genus of crab spiders (family Thomisidae) with around 140 described species. The genus includes species that vary widely in their ecology, with some that are ambush predators that feed on insects visiting flowers. Like several other genera in the family Thomisidae, they are sometimes referred to as flower crab spiders, from their crab-like motion and their way of holding their front legs, reminiscent of a crab spreading its claws as a threat.

== Description and behavior ==
The eye arrangement of spiders in the genus Thomisus

As with most Thomisidae species, Thomisus exhibit sexual size dimorphism: females are 4 to 10 mm (0.16 to 0.39 in) in length, whereas males are only 2 to 7 mm (0.079 to 0.276 in). Many species are brightly colored, usually matching the color of the flower in which they are waiting in ambush. Not all species are flower-dwelling, but among those that are, at least some species can change their colour over a period of some days to match the flower colour. Studies suggest that bees are inclined to avoid a flower that contains a spider-sized object of a non-matching colour; whether this is specifically a mechanism for avoiding crab spiders, or simply that they are not attracted to flowers whose nectar guides are obscured however, is a more difficult question. The colour changes that such species can achieve are typically in ranges of white, pink, and yellow.

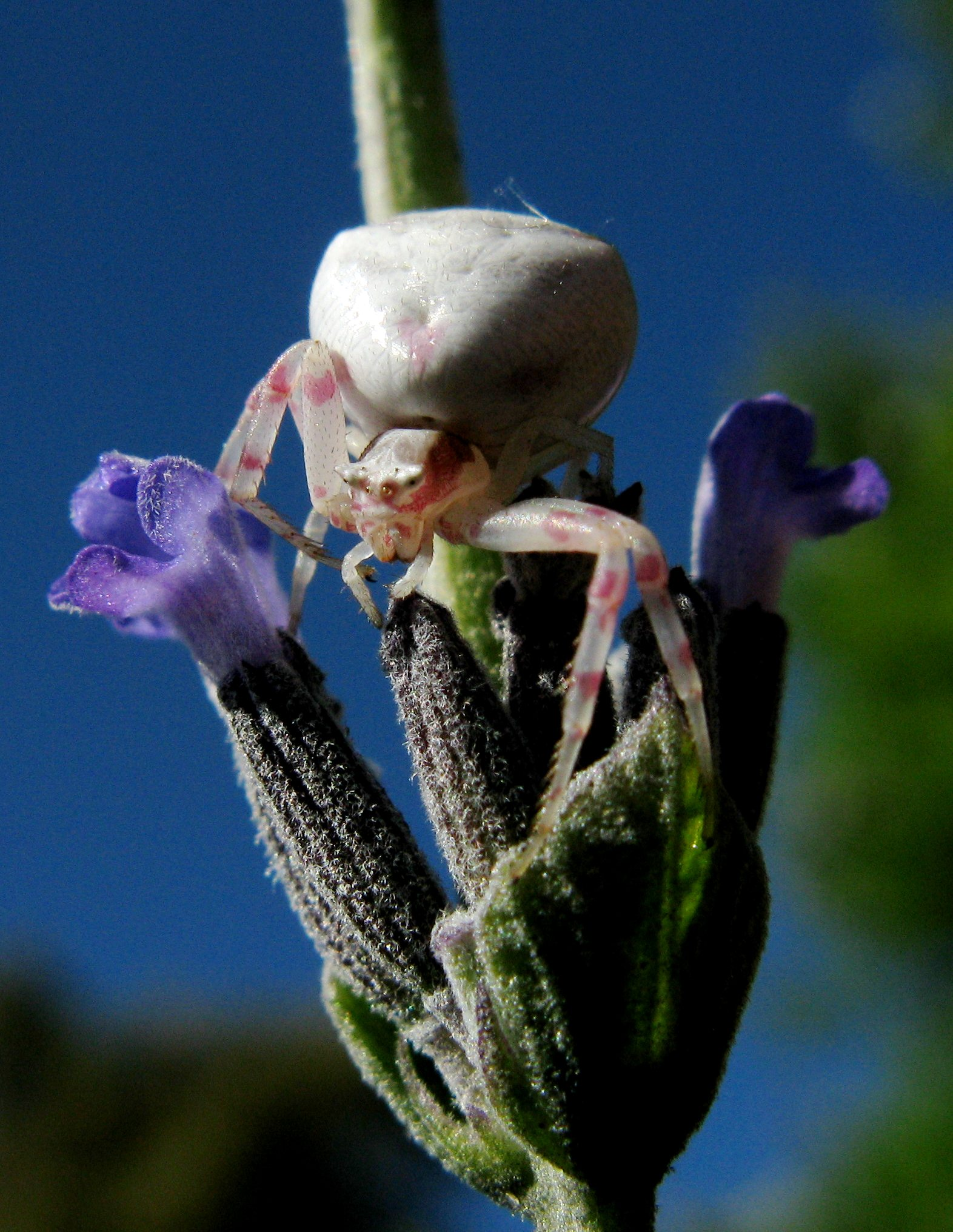
South African Thomisus sp. on Lavandula

For example, in Thomisus spectabilis, the method of camouflage is similar to the Misumena vatia, though T. spectabilis are visible to their prey, but not their predators. This species of crab spiders is UV reflective while the flower is UV absorbing creating a contrast between the spider and flower through the eyes of the pollinator. The contrast created greatly attracts pollinators such as honeybees. This evolutionary method of camouflage increased the likelihood the crab spiders encountered prey, which in turn effects the fitness of the crab spiders. Due to the increased encounter rate of prey the spiders are able to focus energy on reproduction therefore leading to increased fitness in the spiders. The evolutionary method of camouflage greatly increases the survivability and fitness of crab spiders.

== Distribution ==
The distribution of Thomisus species is almost worldwide, with the notable exception of most of South America. Although Thomisus species can be found almost anywhere on earth, most species occur in the tropics and the warmer regions of the Old World, with fewer species in the region from New Guinea to Australia and the New World. Only Thomisus guadahyrensis is known from South America (in Peru).

== Species ==
As of September 2025, this genus includes 137 species and five subspecies.

Species with articles on Wikipedia:

- Thomisus australis Comellini, 1957 – DR Congo, Burundi, Tanzania, Malawi, Mozambique, South Africa, Lesotho
- Thomisus blandus Karsch, 1880 – Sub-Saharan Africa, Yemen
- Thomisus callidus (Thorell, 1890) – Sri Lanka, Singapore, Indonesia (Sumatra, Nias Is., Java)
- Thomisus citrinellus Simon, 1875 – Mediterranean, Africa, Seychelles, Yemen (mainland, Socotra), Iraq, Iran?
- Thomisus congoensis Comellini, 1957 – Cape Verde, DR Congo, Angola, South Africa, Eswatini
- Thomisus dalmasi Lessert, 1919 – Guinea, Cameroon, DR Congo, Rwanda, Tanzania, Malawi, Mozambique, South Africa
- Thomisus daradioides Simon, 1890 – Africa to India
- Thomisus ghesquierei Lessert, 1943 – DR Congo, South Africa
- Thomisus granulatus Karsch, 1880 – Zambia, Malawi, Namibia, Botswana, South Africa, Eswatini
- Thomisus granulifrons Simon, 1906 – India, Sri Lanka
- Thomisus guadahyrensis Keyserling, 1880 – Peru
- Thomisus kalaharinus Lawrence, 1936 – Sub-Saharan Africa, Yemen
- Thomisus kitamurai Nakatsudi, 1943 – Japan (Ryukyu Is.)
- Thomisus labefactus Karsch, 1881 – Korea, Japan, China, Taiwan, Thailand
- Thomisus machadoi Comellini, 1959 – Cape Verde, Angola, South Africa
- Thomisus marginifrons Schenkel, 1963 – China
- Thomisus natalensis Lawrence, 1942 – Zimbabwe, South Africa
- Thomisus nepenthiphilus Fage, 1930 – Indonesia (Sumatra)
- Thomisus okinawensis Strand, 1907 – Thailand to Japan (Ryukyu Is.), Philippines, Indonesia
- Thomisus onustus Walckenaer, 1805 – Savage Islands, Europe, North Africa, Turkey, Caucasus, Russia (Europe to South Siberia), Israel, Jordan, Iran, Kazakhstan, Central Asia, China, Korea, Japan (type species)
- Thomisus schultzei Simon, 1910 – Namibia, Botswana, South Africa
- Thomisus scrupeus (Simon, 1886) – Sub-Saharan Africa
- Thomisus socotrensis Dippenaar-Schoeman & van Harten, 2007 – Yemen (Socotra)
- Thomisus spectabilis Doleschall, 1859 – India to Australia
- Thomisus spiculosus Pocock, 1901 – Nigeria, DR Congo, Tanzania, Zimbabwe, Mozambique, South Africa
- Thomisus stenningi Pocock, 1900 – Africa, Seychelles, Yemen
- Thomisus zuluanus Lawrence, 1942 – South Africa
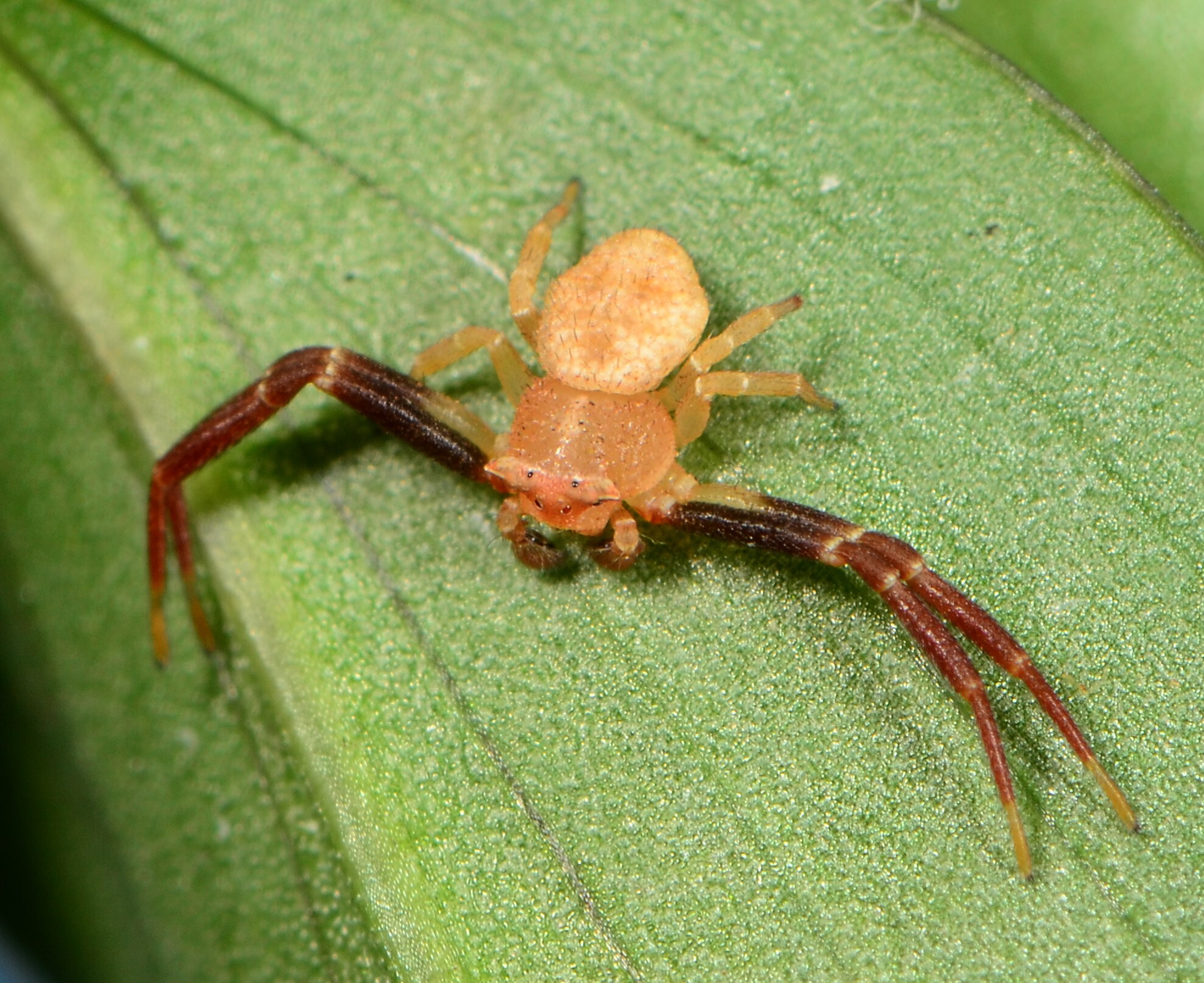
Male T. congoensis

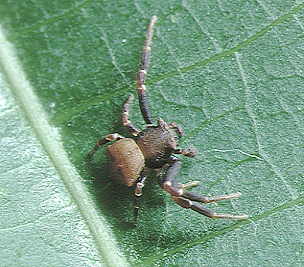
Male Thomisus kitamurai from Japan

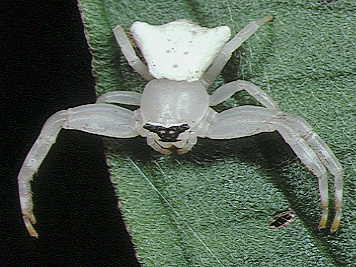
Female Thomisus kitamurai in Japan

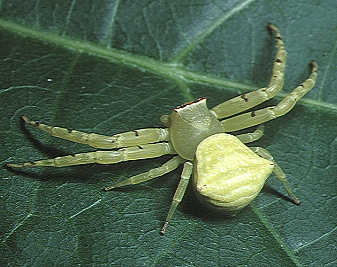
Female Thomisus okinawensis in Japan

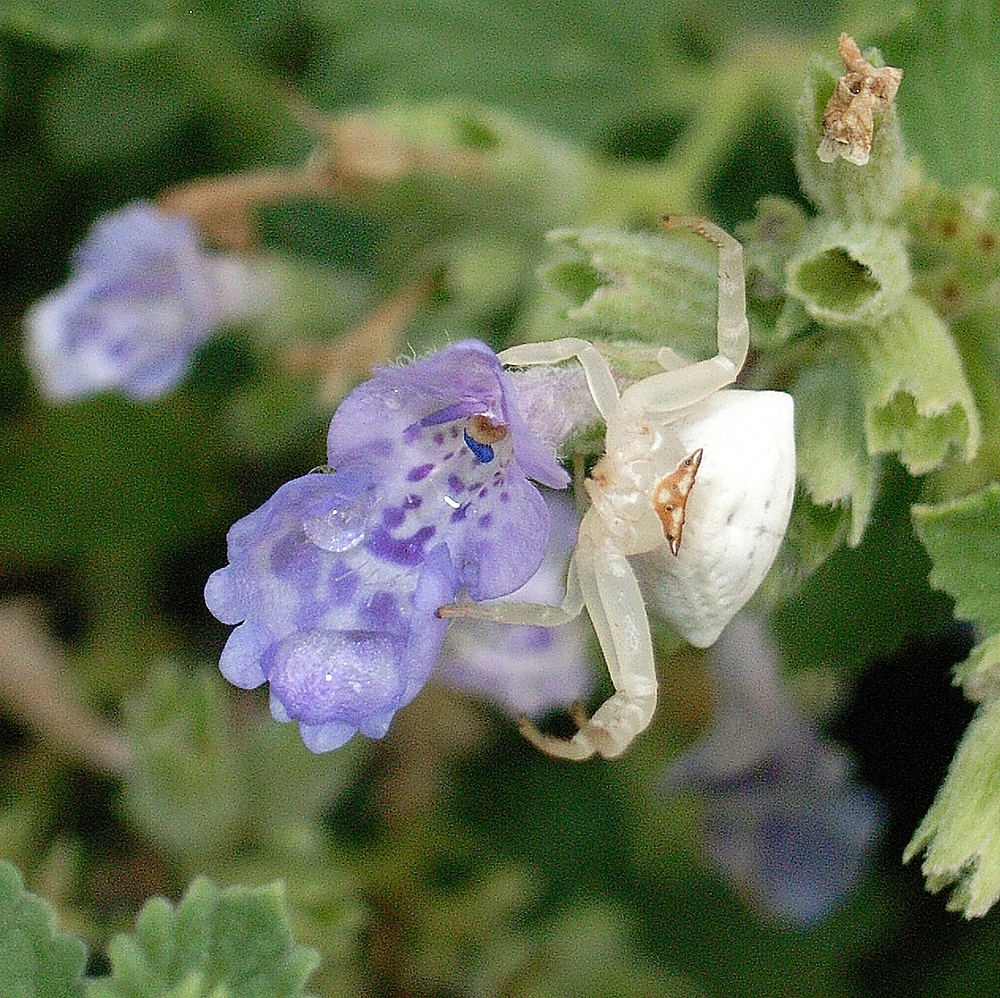
Female Thomisus labefactus

Complete species list as of September 2025
- Thomisus albens O. Pickard-Cambridge, 1885 – Pakistan, China, (Yarkand)
- Thomisus albertianus Strand, 1913 – Gabon, DR Congo, Uganda, Angola
  - T. a. guineensis Millot, 1942 – Guinea, Angola
  - T. a. maculatus Comellini, 1959 – Cameroon, DR Congo
  - T. a. verrucosus Comellini, 1957 – DR Congo
- Thomisus albohirtus Simon, 1884 – Sudan, Ethiopia, Somalia, Yemen, Iran?
- Thomisus amadelphus Simon, 1909 – Vietnam
- Thomisus andamanensis Tikader, 1980 – India (mainland, Andaman Is.)
- Thomisus angulatulus Roewer, 1951 – Gabon
- Thomisus angustifrons Lucas, 1858 – Gabon
- Thomisus arabicus Simon, 1882 – Yemen
- Thomisus armillatus (Thorell, 1891) – India (Nicobar Is.)
- Thomisus aruni Biswas & Raychaudhuri, 2023 – Bangladesh
- Thomisus ashishi Gajbe, 2005 – India
- Thomisus australis Comellini, 1957 – DR Congo, Burundi, Tanzania, Malawi, Mozambique, South Africa, Lesotho
- Thomisus baghdeoi Gajbe, 2004 – India
- Thomisus bargi Gajbe, 2004 – India
- Thomisus benoiti Comellini, 1959 – DR Congo
- Thomisus bhagabatii Biswas & Raychaudhuri, 2024 – Bangladesh
- Thomisus bicolor Walckenaer, 1837 – United States
- Thomisus bidentatus Kulczyński, 1901 – West Africa, Saudi Arabia, Yemen
- Thomisus bigibbosus Keyserling, 1881 – United States
- Thomisus blandus Karsch, 1880 – Sub-Saharan Africa, Yemen
- Thomisus boesenbergi Lenz, 1891 – Madagascar
- Thomisus bonnieri Simon, 1902 – Oman
- Thomisus bueanus Strand, 1916 – Cameroon
- Thomisus bulani Tikader, 1960 – India
- Thomisus callidus (Thorell, 1890) – Sri Lanka, Singapore, Indonesia (Sumatra, Nias Is., Java)
- Thomisus candidus Blackwall, 1866 – south-east equatorial Africa
- Thomisus castaneiceps Simon, 1909 – Vietnam
- Thomisus cavaleriei Schenkel, 1963 – China
- Thomisus citrinellus Simon, 1875 – Mediterranean, Africa, Seychelles, Yemen (mainland, Socotra), Iraq, Iran?
- Thomisus congoensis Comellini, 1957 – Cape Verde, DR Congo, Angola, South Africa, Eswatini
- Thomisus dalmasi Lessert, 1919 – Guinea, Cameroon, DR Congo, Rwanda, Tanzania, Malawi, Mozambique, South Africa
- Thomisus danieli Gajbe, 2004 – India
- Thomisus daradioides Simon, 1890 – Africa, India
  - T. d. nigroannulatus Caporiacco, 1947 – Tanzania
- Thomisus dartevellei Comellini, 1957 – DR Congo, Ethiopia, Malawi
- Thomisus dentiger (Thorell, 1887) – Myanmar
- Thomisus destefanii Caporiacco, 1941 – Ethiopia
- Thomisus dhakuriensis Tikader, 1960 – India
- Thomisus dhananjayi Gajbe, 2005 – India
- Thomisus duriusculus (Thorell, 1877) – Indonesia (Sulawesi)
- Thomisus dyali Kumari & Mittal, 1997 – India
- Thomisus elongatus Stoliczka, 1869 – India
- Thomisus eminulus Tang & Li, 2010 – China
- Thomisus galeatus Simon, 1909 – Vietnam
- Thomisus ghesquierei Lessert, 1943 – DR Congo, South Africa
- Thomisus godavariae Reddy & Patel, 1992 – India
- Thomisus gouluensis Peng, Yin & Kim, 2000 – China
- Thomisus granulatus Karsch, 1880 – Zambia, Malawi, Namibia, Botswana, South Africa, Eswatini
- Thomisus granulifrons Simon, 1906 – India, Sri Lanka
- Thomisus guadahyrensis Keyserling, 1880 – Peru
- Thomisus guangxicus Song & Zhu, 1995 – China
- Thomisus hararinus Caporiacco, 1947 – Ethiopia
- Thomisus hui Song & Zhu, 1995 – China
- Thomisus hunanensis Peng, Yin & Kim, 2000 – China
- Thomisus ilocanus Barrion & Litsinger, 1995 – Philippines
- Thomisus iswadus Barrion & Litsinger, 1995 – Philippines
- Thomisus italongus Barrion & Litsinger, 1995 – Philippines
- Thomisus janinae Comellini, 1957 – DR Congo, Tanzania
- Thomisus jocquei Dippenaar-Schoeman, 1988 – Malawi
- Thomisus kalaharinus Lawrence, 1936 – Sub-Saharan Africa, Yemen
- Thomisus katrajghatus Tikader, 1963 – India
- Thomisus keralae Biswas & Roy, 2005 – India
- Thomisus kitamurai Nakatsudi, 1943 – Japan (Ryukyu Is.)
- Thomisus kiwuensis Strand, 1913 – Central Africa
- Thomisus kokiwadai Gajbe, 2004 – India
- Thomisus krishnae Reddy & Patel, 1992 – India
- Thomisus labefactus Karsch, 1881 – Korea, Japan, China, Taiwan, Thailand
- Thomisus laglaizei Simon, 1877 – Myanmar, Philippines, Indonesia (Java, Sumatra)
- Thomisus lamperti Strand, 1907 – Madagascar
- Thomisus leucaspis Simon, 1906 – India, New Caledonia
- Thomisus litoris Strand, 1913 – DR Congo and/or Uganda
- Thomisus lobosus Tikader, 1965 – India
- Thomisus ludhianaensis Kumari & Mittal, 1997 – India
- Thomisus machadoi Comellini, 1959 – Cape Verde, Angola, South Africa
- Thomisus madagascariensis Comellini, 1957 – Madagascar
  - T. m. pallidus Comellini, 1957 – Madagascar
- Thomisus magaspangus Barrion, Barrion-Dupo & Heong, 2013 – China (Hainan)
- Thomisus manishae Gajbe, 2005 – India
- Thomisus manjuae Gajbe, 2005 – India
- Thomisus marginifrons Schenkel, 1963 – China
- Thomisus meenae Gajbe, 2005 – India
- Thomisus melanostethus Simon, 1909 – Vietnam
- Thomisus mimae Sen & Basu, 1963 – India
- Thomisus modestus Blackwall, 1870 – Italy
- Thomisus natalensis Lawrence, 1942 – Zimbabwe, South Africa
- Thomisus nepenthiphilus Fage, 1930 – Indonesia (Sumatra)
- Thomisus nirmali Saha & Raychaudhuri, 2007 – India
- Thomisus obscuratus Caporiacco, 1947 – Eritrea
- Thomisus obtusesetulosus Roewer, 1961 – Senegal
- Thomisus ochraceus Walckenaer, 1841 – Algeria
- Thomisus odiosus O. Pickard-Cambridge, 1898 – Mexico
- Thomisus okinawensis Strand, 1907 – Thailand, Japan (Ryukyu Is.), Philippines, Indonesia
- Thomisus onustus Walckenaer, 1805 – Savage Islands, Europe, North Africa, Turkey, Caucasus, Russia (Europe to South Siberia), Israel, Jordan, Iran, Kazakhstan, Central Asia, China, Korea, Japan (type species)
- Thomisus oscitans Walckenaer, 1837 – United States
- Thomisus pateli Gajbe, 2004 – India
- Thomisus pathaki Gajbe, 2004 – India
- Thomisus penicillatus Simon, 1909 – Vietnam
- Thomisus perspicillatus (Thorell, 1890) – Borneo (not specified)
- Thomisus pooneus Tikader, 1965 – India
- Thomisus pritiae Gajbe, 2005 – India
- Thomisus projectus Tikader, 1960 – India
- Thomisus pugilis Stoliczka, 1869 – Pakistan, India
- Thomisus rajani Bhandari & Gajbe, 2001 – India
- Thomisus retirugus Simon, 1909 – Vietnam
- Thomisus rigoratus Simon, 1906 – India
- Thomisus rishus Tikader, 1970 – India
- Thomisus roeweri Comellini, 1957 – Tanzania
- Thomisus schoutedeni Comellini, 1957 – DR Congo
- Thomisus schultzei Simon, 1910 – Namibia, Botswana, South Africa
- Thomisus scrupeus (Simon, 1886) – Sub-Saharan Africa
- Thomisus shillongensis Sen, 1963 – India
- Thomisus shivajiensis Tikader, 1965 – India
- Thomisus sikkimensis Tikader, 1962 – India
- Thomisus simoni Gajbe, 2004 – India
- Thomisus socotrensis Dippenaar-Schoeman & van Harten, 2007 – Yemen (Socotra)
- Thomisus spectabilis Doleschall, 1859 – India, Australia
- Thomisus spiculosus Pocock, 1901 – Nigeria, DR Congo, Tanzania, Zimbabwe, Mozambique, South Africa
- Thomisus stenningi Pocock, 1900 – Africa, Seychelles, Yemen
- Thomisus stigmatisatus Walckenaer, 1837 – United States
- Thomisus stoliczkai (Thorell, 1887) – Myanmar
- Thomisus sundari Gajbe & Gajbe, 2001 – India
- Thomisus swatowensis Strand, 1907 – China
- Thomisus telanganaensis Pravalikha & Srinivasulu, 2015 – India
- Thomisus tetricus Simon, 1890 – Yemen
- Thomisus transversus Fox, 1937 – China
- Thomisus tripunctatus Lucas, 1858 – West Africa
- Thomisus tuberculatus Dyal, 1935 – Pakistan
- Thomisus unidentatus Dippenaar-Schoeman & van Harten, 2007 – Yemen, Iraq, Iran, Pakistan, India
- Thomisus venulatus Walckenaer, 1841 – Algeria
- Thomisus viveki Gajbe, 2004 – India
- Thomisus vulnerabilis Mello-Leitão, 1929 – Myanmar
- Thomisus wangi Tang, Yin & Peng, 2012 – China
- Thomisus whitakeri Gajbe, 2004 – India
- Thomisus yarang Wang, Lu & Z. S. Zhang, 2024 – China
- Thomisus yemensis Dippenaar-Schoeman & van Harten, 2007 – Yemen
- Thomisus zaheeri Parveen, Khan, Mushtaq, Ahmad & Rana, 2008 – Pakistan
- Thomisus zhui Tang & Song, 1988 – China
- Thomisus zuluanus Lawrence, 1942 – South Africa
- Thomisus zyuzini Marusik & Logunov, 1990 – Turkey, Cyprus, Saudi Arabia, Central Asia, Mongolia
