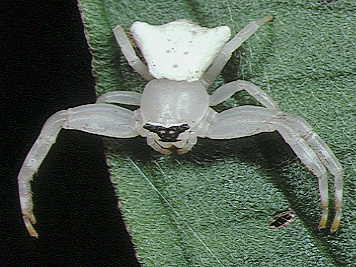
- female
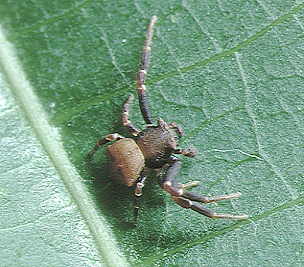
- male

Scientific classification
- Kingdom: Animalia
- Phylum: Arthropoda
- Subphylum: Chelicerata
- Class: Arachnida
- Order: Araneae
- Infraorder: Araneomorphae
- Family: Thomisidae
- Genus: Thomisus
- Species: T. kitamurai

Binomial name
- Thomisus kitamurai Nakatsudi, 1943

= Thomisus kitamurai =

Species of spider

Thomisus kitamurai is a species of crab spider in the family Thomisidae. It is endemic to the Ryukyu Islands of Japan.

== Etymology ==
The species is named in honor of Kitamura, though the specific individual being honored is not specified in the original description.

== Distribution ==
Thomisus kitamurai is known only from the Ryukyu Islands, specifically from Okinawa Island and Amami Ōshima.

== Description ==
Females of Thomisus kitamurai have a body length of 10.3–12.0 mm, while males are smaller at 2.5–3.1 mm. The species exhibits pronounced sexual dimorphism, with males being significantly smaller than females, a characteristic common among crab spiders.

The male's opisthosoma (abdomen) has a distinctive appearance with specific markings on the posterior dorsal region that are somewhat less prominent than in related species.

The species was originally described from male specimens, with females being described later in 1988 when Ono provided a more comprehensive redescription of both sexes.

== Habitat ==
Thomisus kitamurai inhabits the subtropical environments of the Ryukyu Islands, where it likely occupies similar ecological niches to other crab spiders, typically ambushing prey on flowers and vegetation.
