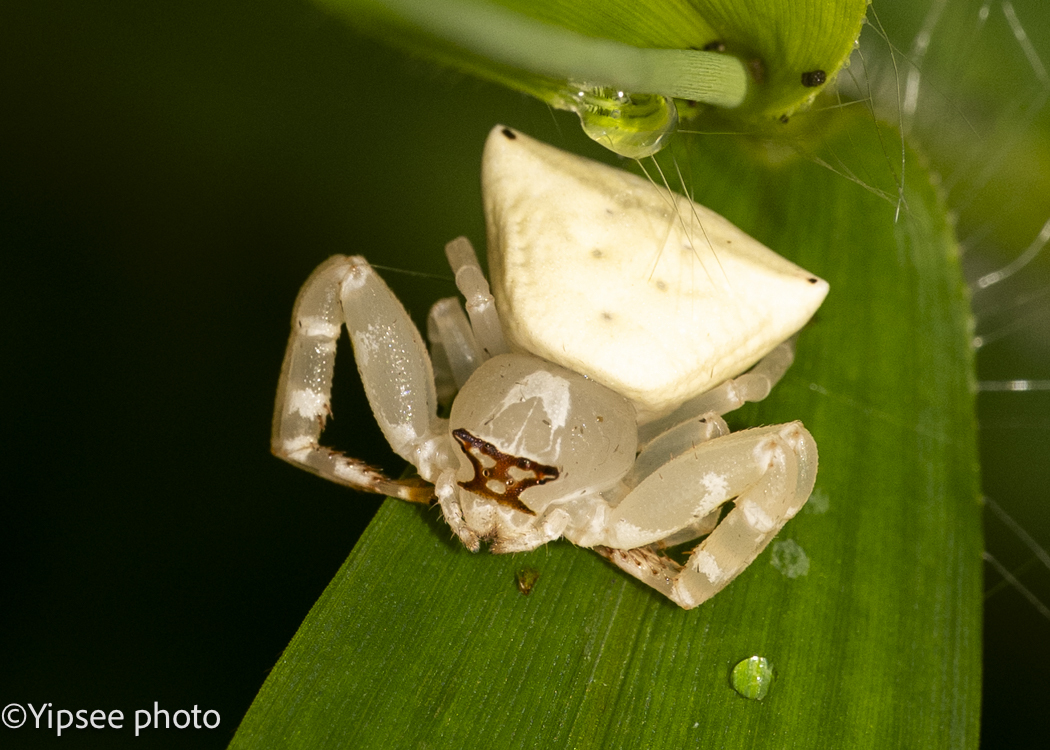
- possible female from Thailand

Scientific classification
- Kingdom: Animalia
- Phylum: Arthropoda
- Subphylum: Chelicerata
- Class: Arachnida
- Order: Araneae
- Infraorder: Araneomorphae
- Family: Thomisidae
- Genus: Thomisus
- Species: T. marginifrons

Binomial name
- Thomisus marginifrons Schenkel, 1963

= Thomisus marginifrons =

Species of spider

Thomisus marginifrons is a species of crab spider in the family Thomisidae. It is endemic to China.

== Etymology ==
The species name is a combination of Latin margo "edge, margin" and frons "forehead".

== Distribution ==
Thomisus marginifrons has been recorded from the Pin-Fag region of Kony, Sichuan, China.

== Description ==
Only the female of Thomisus marginifrons has been described.

The female has a cephalothorax that is broader than it is long, measuring 5.1 mm in length and 5.4 mm in width. The opisthosoma is 6 mm long and 10 mm wide. The spider shows typical crab spider characteristics with a flattened appearance.

The cephalothorax is light brown in coloration. The upper margin of the face features a deep black border that extends posteriorly in a white-edged transverse band reaching to the tips of the tubercles. This band is only slightly procurved from above and distinctly recurved from the front. The chelicerae are somewhat shorter than the face height, being nearly twice as broad as long at the top and tapering strongly downward.

The legs show a distinctive coloration pattern, being light brown with indistinct whitish banding on legs I and II, and narrow bands before the end of the patella. The underside of the front body and legs is somewhat darker than the upper side. The rounded opisthosoma is yellowish in color.

The species is characterized by its eye arrangement, with the posterior eyes being subequal in size, and the lateral eyes only slightly larger than the median eyes. The width ratio is 3:2.5, with the posterior eye row being weakly recurved.
