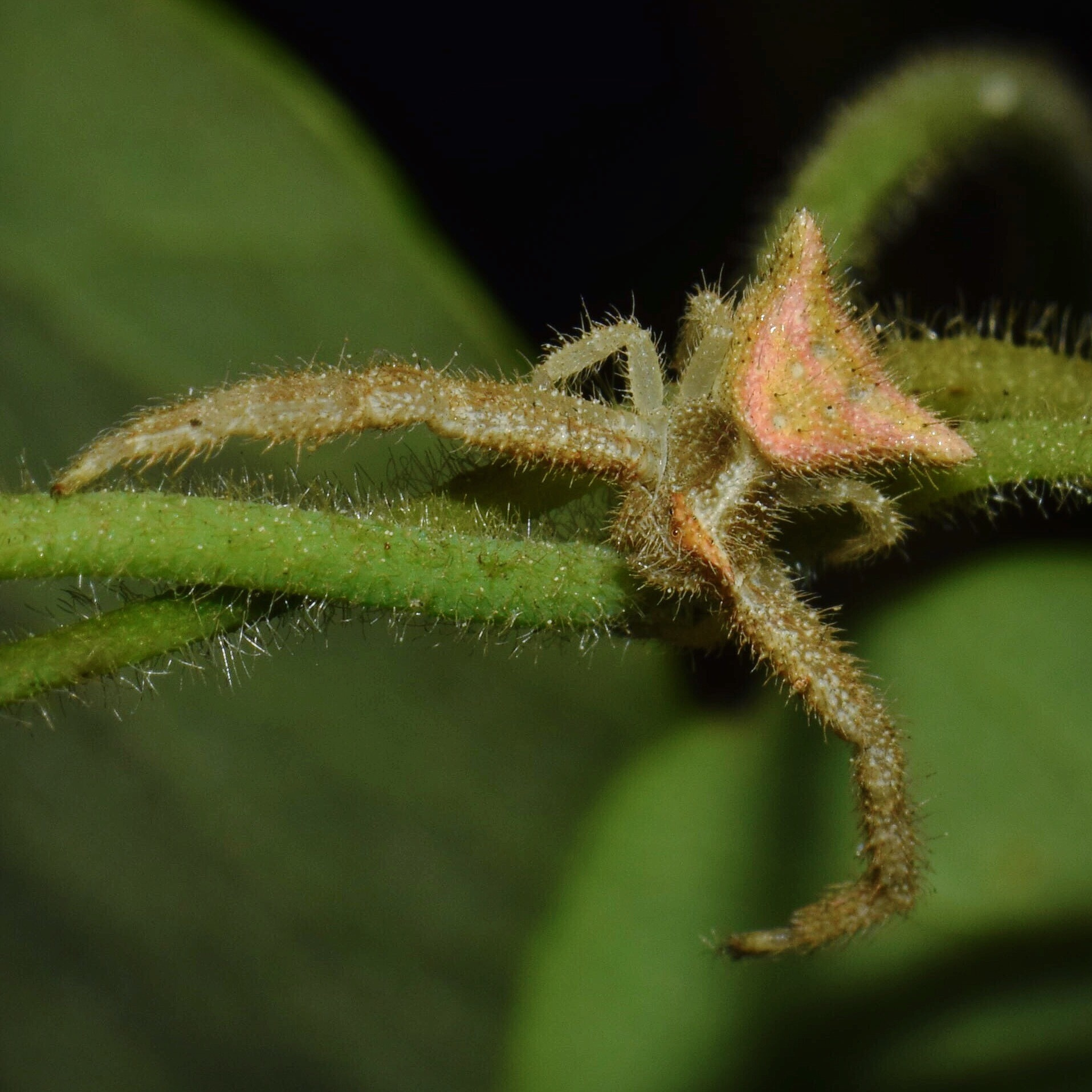
- female from South Africa
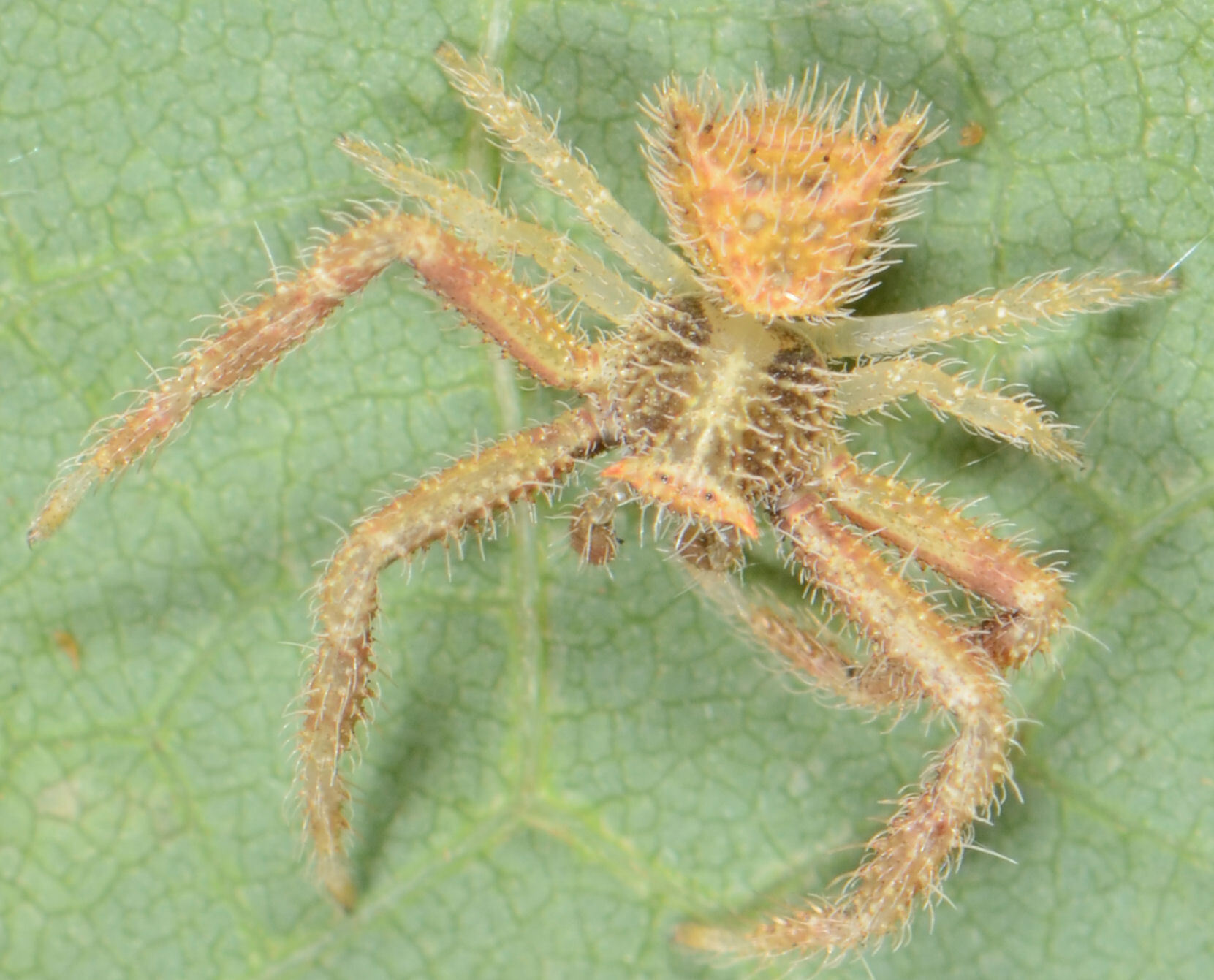
- male

Scientific classification
- Kingdom: Animalia
- Phylum: Arthropoda
- Subphylum: Chelicerata
- Class: Arachnida
- Order: Araneae
- Infraorder: Araneomorphae
- Family: Thomisidae
- Genus: Thomisus
- Species: T. spiculosus

Binomial name
- Thomisus spiculosus Pocock, 1901

Synonyms
- Thomisus dottrensi Comellini, 1957

= Thomisus spiculosus =

Species of spider

Thomisus spiculosus is a species of spider of the genus Thomisus in the family Thomisidae. It is found in several countries in Africa.

== Etymology ==
The species name spiculosus derives from the Latin word meaning "pointed" or "bearing small spikes," referring to the numerous spiniform setae that cover the spider's body and give it a distinctly hairy appearance.

== Distribution ==
Thomisus spiculosus has been recorded from Nigeria, Democratic Republic of the Congo, Tanzania, Zimbabwe, Mozambique, and South Africa. In South Africa, the species is distributed across several provinces including Gauteng, KwaZulu-Natal, Limpopo, and Mpumalanga.

== Habitat ==
Thomisus spiculosus is a free-living plant dweller found on vegetation in various habitats. The species has been collected from grass and trees, and occurs in multiple South African biomes except the more arid regions. It has also been recorded in citrus orchards, where it may serve as a beneficial predator.

== Description ==
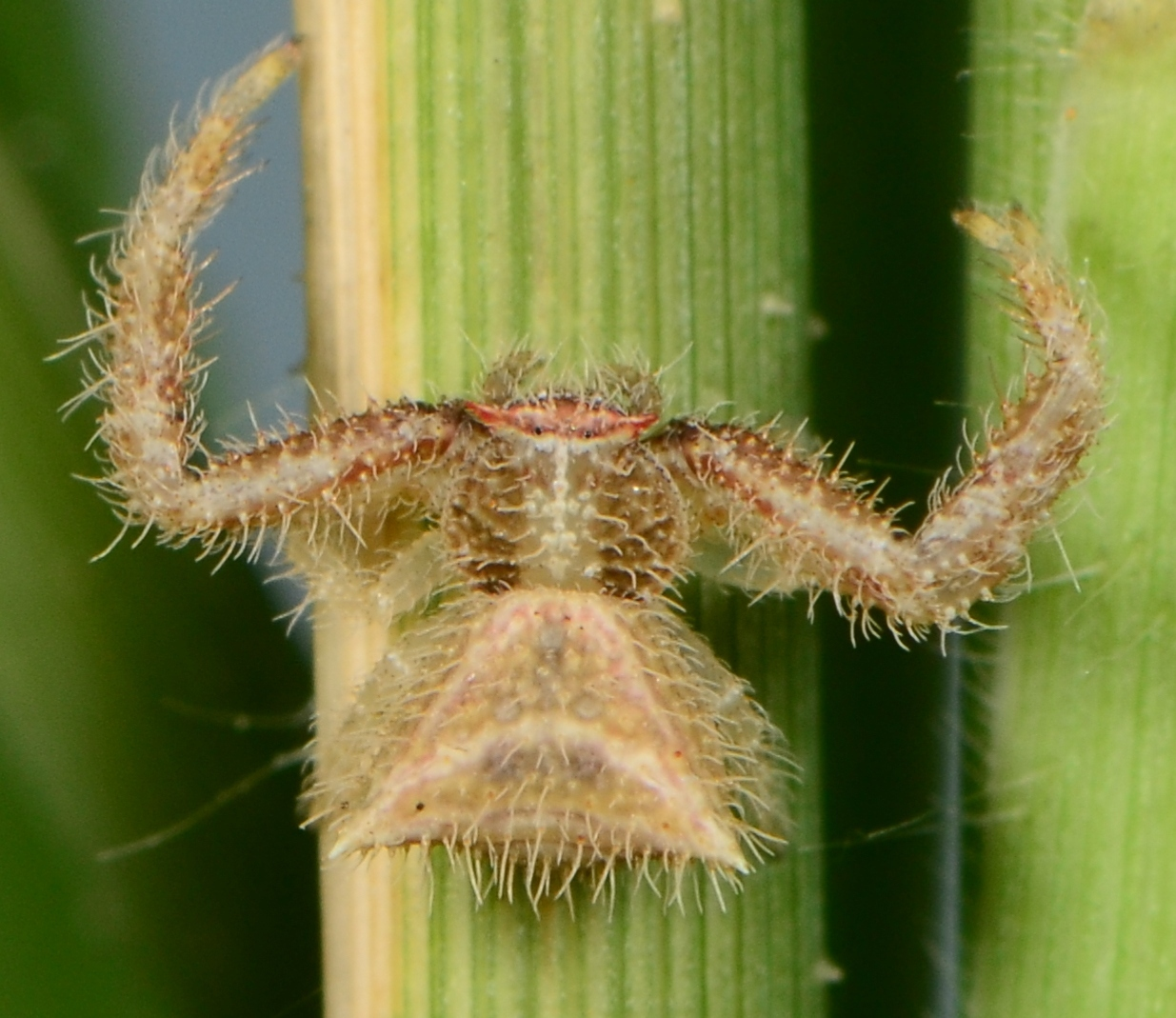
female juvenile

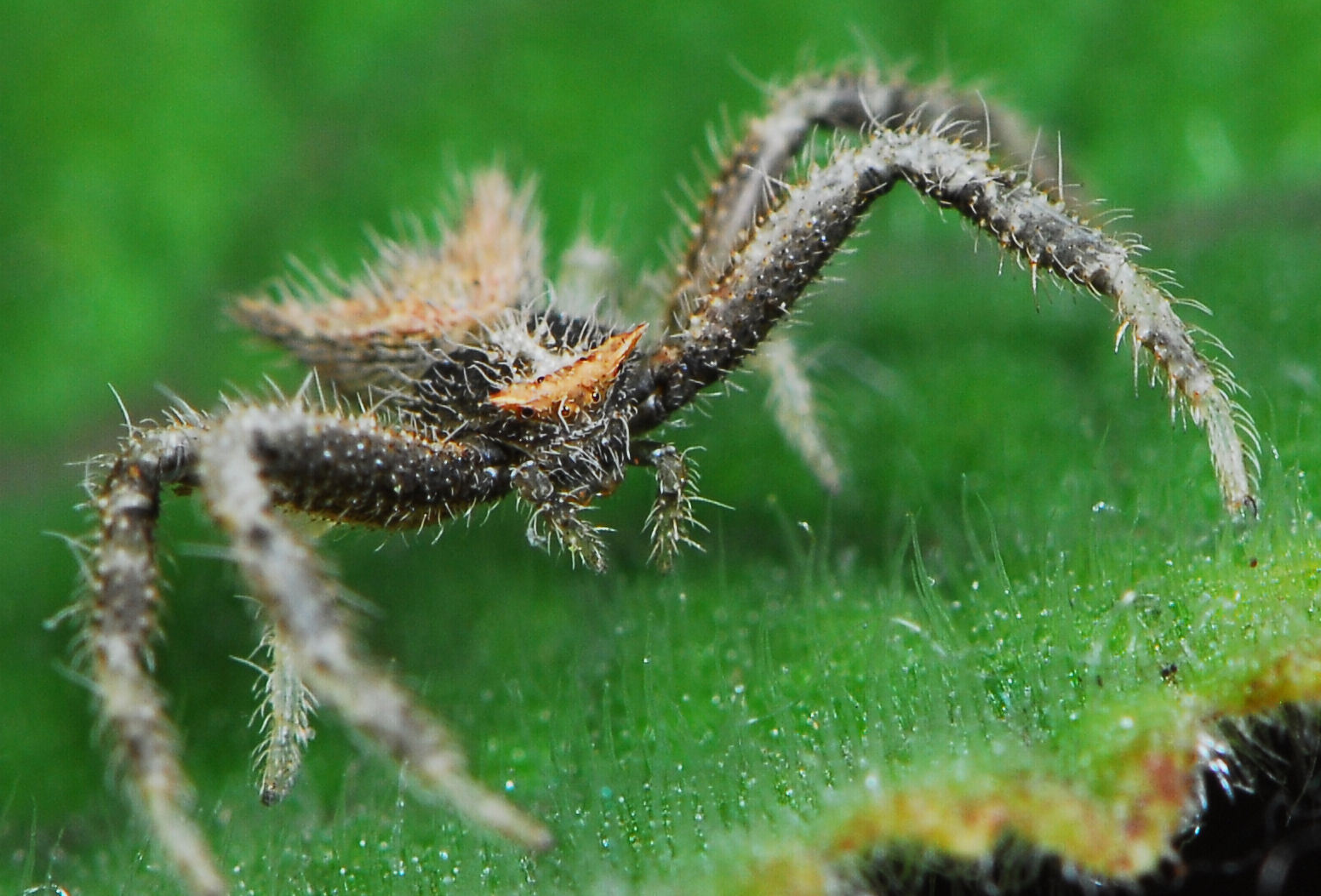
female juvenile

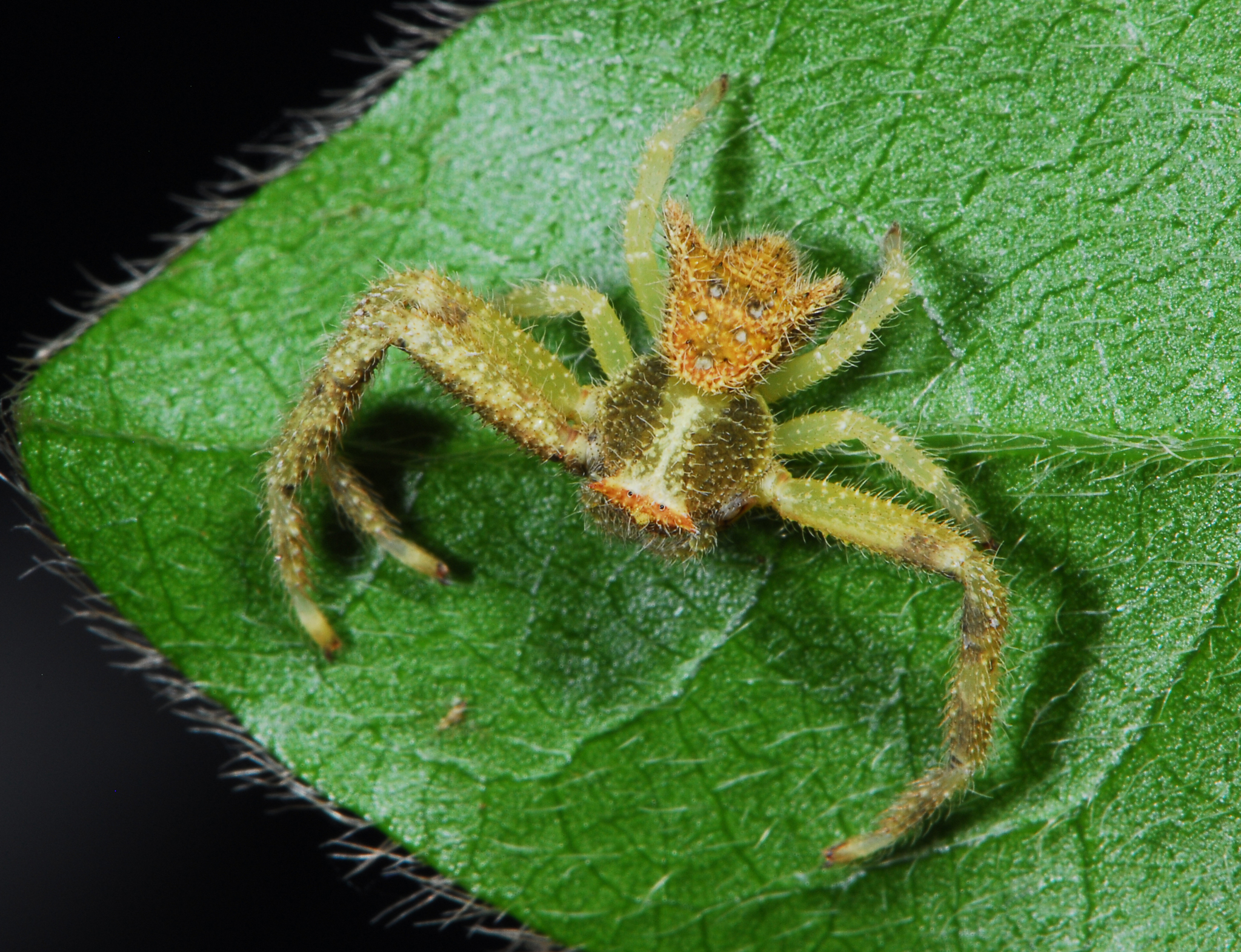
female juvenile

Thomisus spiculosus belongs to a group of crab spiders characterized by short, robust bodies with the first two pairs of legs being particularly stout. The lateral eyes are situated on distinct eye tubercles.

=== Female ===
The female is larger than the male, with a total length of 7.9–8.3 mm. The cephalothorax measures 3.6–3.8 mm in length and 3.5–4.0 mm in width. The body appears yellowish when preserved in alcohol, though living specimens display a pale green carapace and legs with a green-banded opisthosoma.

The most distinctive feature is the dense covering of numerous long, spiniform setae across the body and legs, each arising from a small tubercle. Some setae and their bases are darker than others, creating a mottled appearance. The carapace is high and slightly wider than long, with both eye rows recurved and the anterior row more strongly curved than the posterior.

The eye arrangement shows the anterior lateral eyes slightly larger than the anterior median eyes, with the posterior eyes nearly equal in size. The anterior median eyes are positioned closer to each other than to the anterior lateral eyes.

=== Male ===
Males are considerably smaller than females, measuring 3.6 mm in total length with a carapace length of 1.5 mm and width of 1.8 mm. The carapace is dark brown, becoming slightly darker around the edges, while the chelicerae are also dark brown. The opisthosoma is yellowish brown, and the legs match the carapace color except for the metatarsi and tarsi of the first two leg pairs, which are somewhat paler.

Like females, males are clothed with numerous long setae, though the eye tubercles are more strongly pointed than in females. The pedipalp structure is similar to that of Thomisus tripunctatus.

=== Juveniles ===
Juvenile specimens appear grey to cream-colored with a carapace bearing distinct mediolateral lines. The pattern between eye tubercles is indistinct, and the legs show banding. Juveniles can be distinguished from the related T. blandus by their covering of numerous long, spiniform setae.

== Behavior and ecology ==
Adults are active from September to December, with males specifically recorded during November and December. As predators, they feed on various insects including Lantana bugs. The species has been collected using beating and sweeping techniques from vegetation.

== Taxonomy ==
Thomisus dottrensi Comellini, 1957 was originally described based on a single male specimen from Zaire (now Democratic Republic of the Congo). Upon comparison of the holotype male with males collected alongside T. spiculosus females, no differences could be found, leading to the synonymization of T. dottrensi with T. spiculosus.

The species is closely related to T. blandus and T. tripunctatus, sharing similar size, coloration, and the triangular pattern between the front eyes. However, T. spiculosus can be distinguished by its distinctive covering of numerous long setae.

== Conservation ==
There are no known threats to Thomisus spiculosus. The species is protected in several nature reserves including Roodeplaat Dam Nature Reserve, Makalali Game Reserve, Kruger National Park, Ndumo Game Reserve, Lekgalameetse Nature Reserve, and Blyde River Canyon Nature Reserve. No specific conservation actions are recommended.
