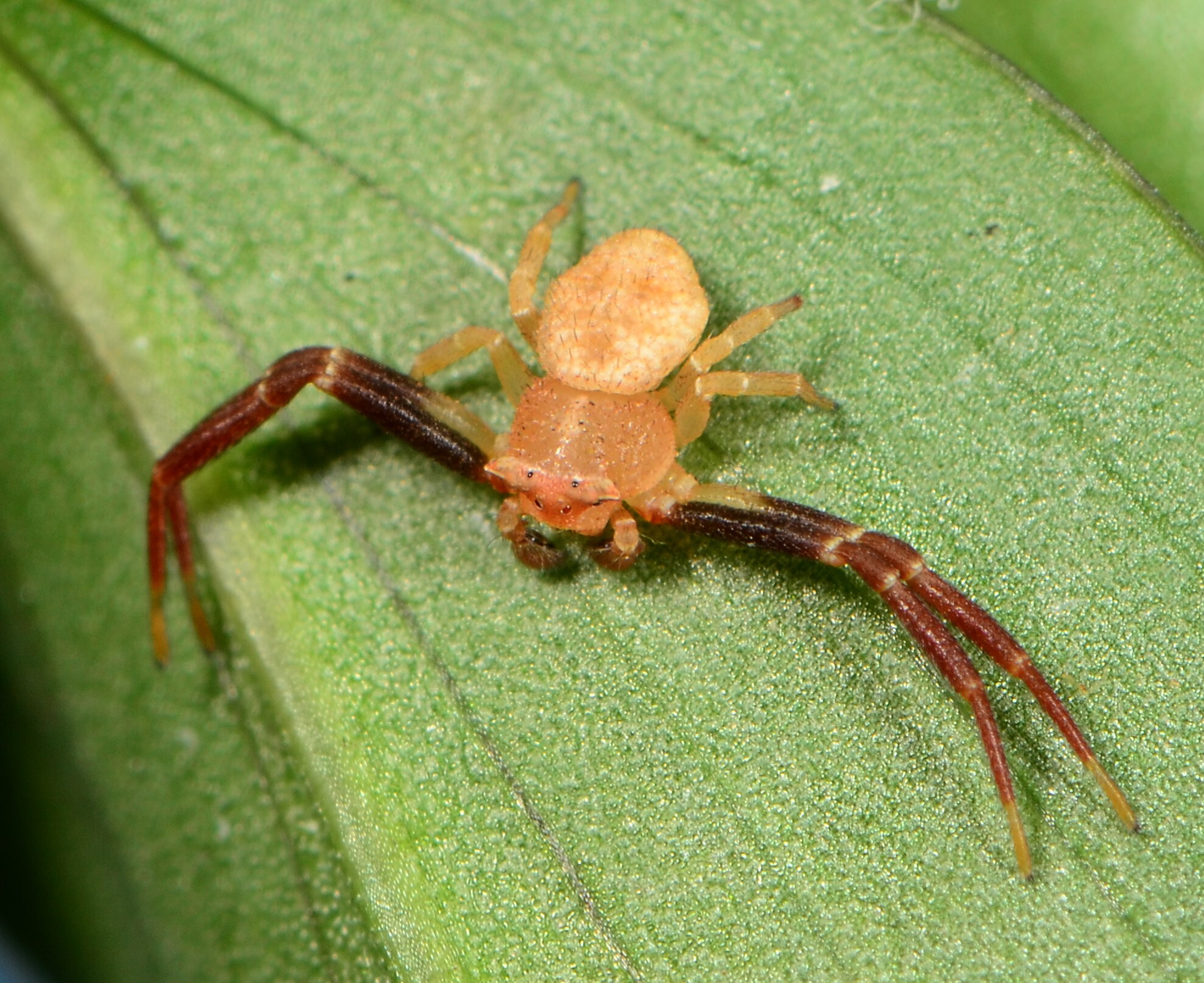
- male from South Africa

Scientific classification
- Kingdom: Animalia
- Phylum: Arthropoda
- Subphylum: Chelicerata
- Class: Arachnida
- Order: Araneae
- Infraorder: Araneomorphae
- Family: Thomisidae
- Genus: Thomisus
- Species: T. congoensis

Binomial name
- Thomisus congoensis Comellini, 1957

= Thomisus congoensis =

Congo's Thomisus crab spider

Species of crab spider

Thomisus congoensis is a species of crab spider in the family Thomisidae. It is found across several African countries.

== Etymology ==
The species name congoensis refers to the Democratic Republic of the Congo (formerly Zaire), where the holotype was collected.

== Distribution ==
Thomisus congoensis has been recorded from Cape Verde, Democratic Republic of the Congo, Angola, South Africa, and Eswatini.

== Habitat ==
This species is free-living on plants and has been sampled in grassland and savanna biomes. It has also been found on crops such as cotton and minneola.

== Description ==
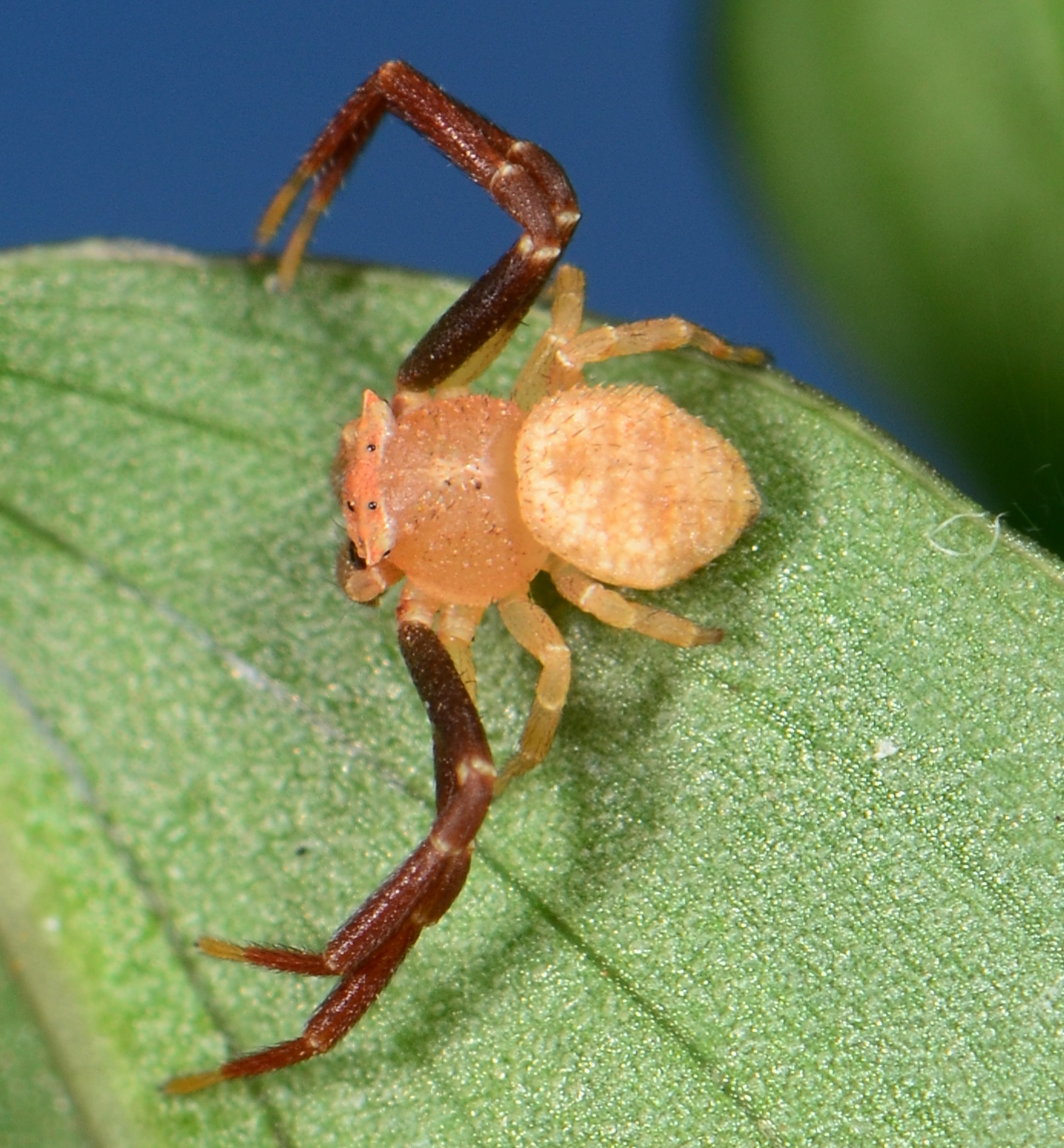
male

Only males of Thomisus congoensis are known, with females and juveniles not yet described.

Males have a total length of 2.5 mm (ranging from 2.2-2.6 mm) and a cephalothorax length of 1.3 mm (1.2-1.3 mm). The cephalothorax is pale brown and the opisthosoma is yellow. The first leg is dark brown except for the yellow tarsus, while the second leg is dark brown except for the yellow coxa, trochanter, basal half of the femur, and tarsus. The joints between all leg segments are white.

The eye tubercles are sharply pointed, with both eye rows slightly recurved. The anterior eyes are larger than the posterior eyes and equal in size to each other. The anterior median eyes are closer to the anterior lateral eyes than to each other, while the posterior median eyes are slightly smaller than the posterior lateral eyes and closer to the posterior lateral eyes than to each other.

The male pedipalp has a broad retrolateral tibial apophysis with small tubercles on the retrolateral side of the tibia. At the base of the RTA, each tubercle has a long thin seta.

== Ecology ==
Males have been collected from trees, grass, and cotton plants during December, January, and May. The species is considered poorly known and infrequently collected.

== Conservation ==
Thomisus congoensis is listed as Least Concern due to its wide geographical range across multiple African countries. It has been recorded in several protected areas including Kruger National Park, Nylsvley Nature Reserve, and Polokwane Nature Reserve.
