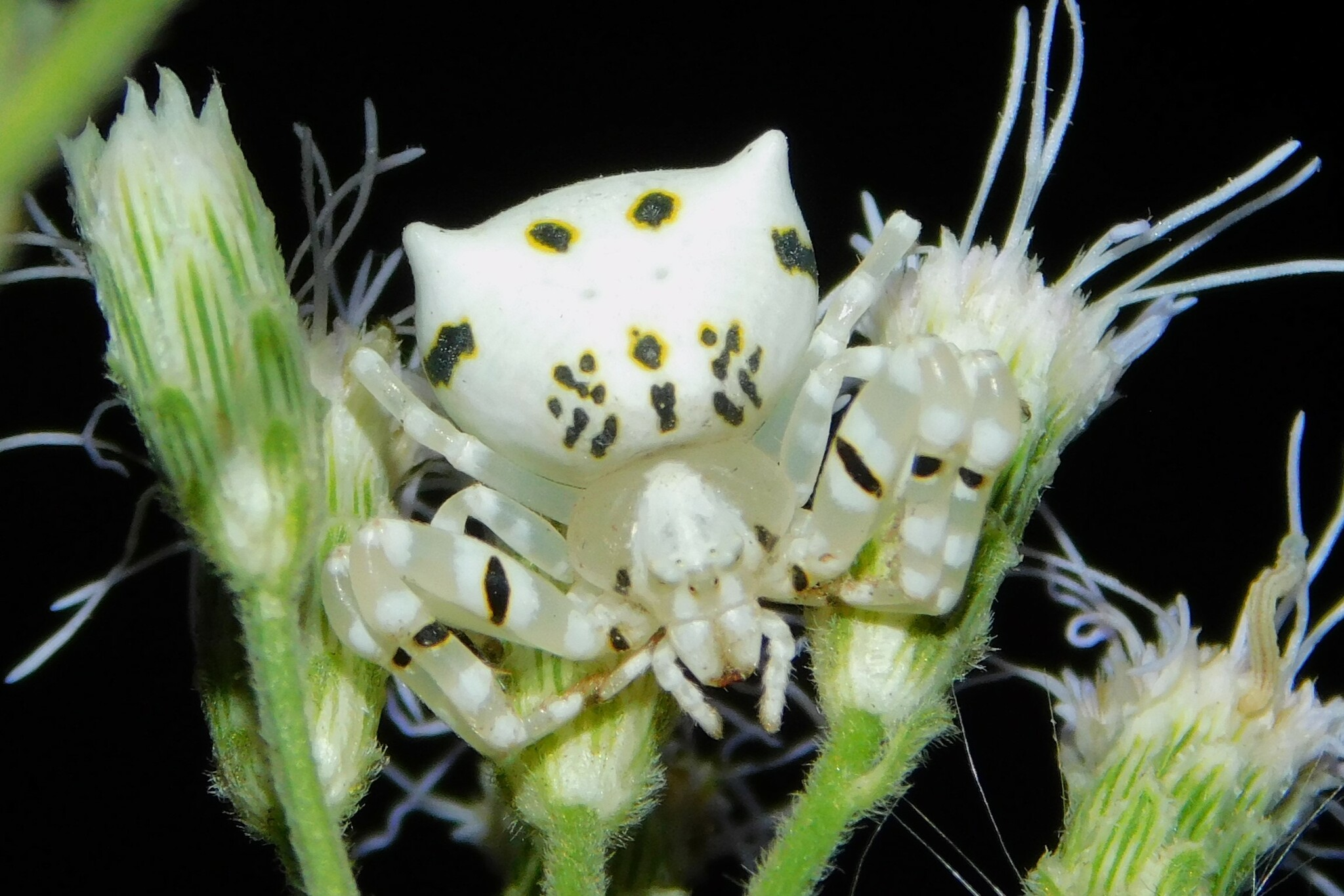
- female from Uganda

Scientific classification
- Kingdom: Animalia
- Phylum: Arthropoda
- Subphylum: Chelicerata
- Class: Arachnida
- Order: Araneae
- Infraorder: Araneomorphae
- Family: Thomisidae
- Genus: Thomisus
- Species: T. ghesquierei

Binomial name
- Thomisus ghesquierei Lessert, 1943

= Thomisus ghesquierei =

Species of crab spider

Thomisus ghesquierei is a species of crab spider in the family Thomisidae. It was first described from the Democratic Republic of the Congo and has since been recorded from South Africa.

== Etymology ==
The specific epithet ghesquierei honours Jean Ghesquière, a Belgian entomologist who collected in the Congo region during the early 20th century.

== Taxonomy ==
The species was originally described by Roger de Lessert in 1943 from a female specimen collected in the Democratic Republic of the Congo. For many years, specimens of T. ghesquierei in South Africa were misidentified as Thomisus citrinellus until the correct identification was established in 2023.

== Distribution ==
Thomisus ghesquierei is known from the Democratic Republic of the Congo and South Africa. In South Africa, it has been recorded from five provinces: Eastern Cape, Gauteng, KwaZulu-Natal, Limpopo, and Mpumalanga.

== Description ==
Females measure 5.3–6.6 mm in total length. The cephalothorax is translucent in live specimens with distinctive curved dark mediolateral bands. The cephalic region appears fawn-coloured in preserved specimens, with the clypeus suffused with white. The eye region is elevated with distinct eye tubercles that are directed more dorsally than in related species.

The opisthosoma is white with scattered dark patterns and spots, showing considerable variation in colouration between individuals and populations. Some specimens appear almost entirely white, while others display darker markings or yellowish tones. The abdominal tubercles are blunt and decorated with small black markings.

The legs are coloured similarly to the cephalothorax, with legs I and II distinctly banded. The femora of legs I and II bear brown bands medially, while the tibiae have white and black spots. The metatarsi and tarsi show distinct banding patterns.

The epigyne is oval-shaped, distinguishing it from the closely related T. citrinellus, which has two circular openings in the epigynal structure.

Males of this species remain unknown.

== Ecology and behaviour ==
Thomisus ghesquierei is a plant-dwelling species frequently found on flowers, where it employs sit-and-wait predation tactics typical of crab spiders.

Egg sacs have been observed constructed within folded leaves, providing protection for the developing offspring. The species has been collected by beating shrubs and sweep netting grasses, shrubs, and trees, indicating its arboreal lifestyle.

== Conservation status ==
Thomisus ghesquierei has a wide distribution across two African countries but appears to be naturally rare or undersampled. The species is considered to be of Least Concern given its broad distribution.
