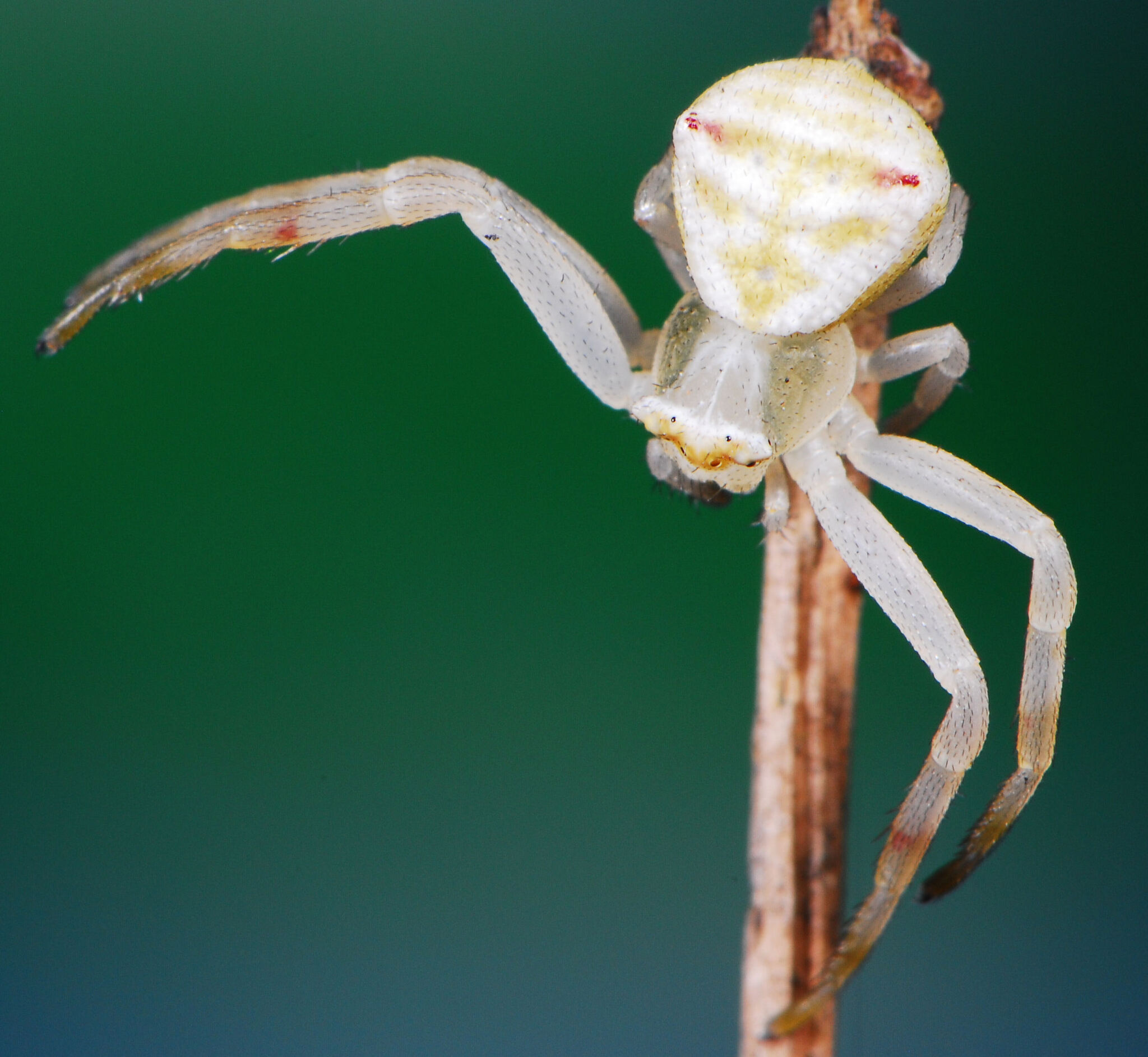
- female from South Africa
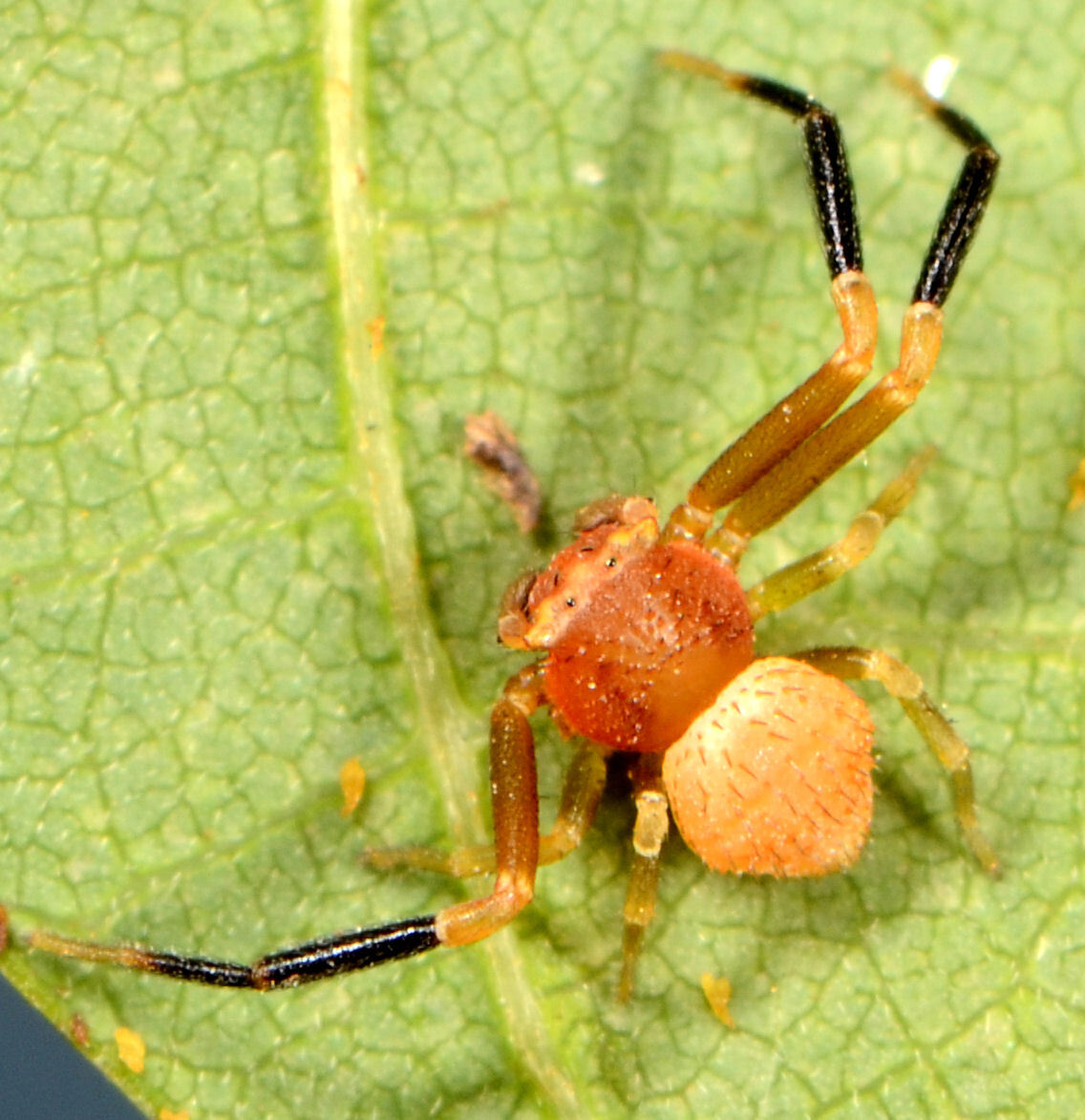
- male

Scientific classification
- Kingdom: Animalia
- Phylum: Arthropoda
- Subphylum: Chelicerata
- Class: Arachnida
- Order: Araneae
- Infraorder: Araneomorphae
- Family: Thomisidae
- Genus: Thomisus
- Species: T. daradioides

Binomial name
- Thomisus daradioides Simon, 1890

Synonyms
- Thomisus lesnei Lessert, 1936; Thomisus sepiosus Lawrence, 1942

= Thomisus daradioides =

Two-spotted Thomisus crab spider

Species of crab spider

Thomisus daradioides is a species of crab spider in the family Thomisidae. Commonly known as the two-spotted Thomisus crab spider, it is widely distributed from Africa to India.

== Etymology ==
The species name derives from its resemblance to members of the genus Daradius Thorell, 1870 (now part of Thomisus).

== Distribution ==
Thomisus daradioides has a broad distribution across the Old World, ranging from Africa to India and Arabia. In Africa, it is known from Ethiopia, Angola, Mozambique, South Africa, Somalia, Sudan, Mali, Burkina Faso, Ivory Coast, Zaire, Zambia, and Zimbabwe.

In South Africa, the species has been recorded from eight provinces. It occurs at elevations ranging from 7 to 2020 meters above sea level.

== Habitat ==
Thomisus daradioides is a free-living species found on plants across various habitats. Adults have been collected mainly from flowers, grass, and shrubs from November to July. The species has been sampled from all South African floral biomes except the Desert, Succulent, and Nama Karoo biomes. It has also been found in agricultural settings, including citrus and macadamia plantations.

== Description ==
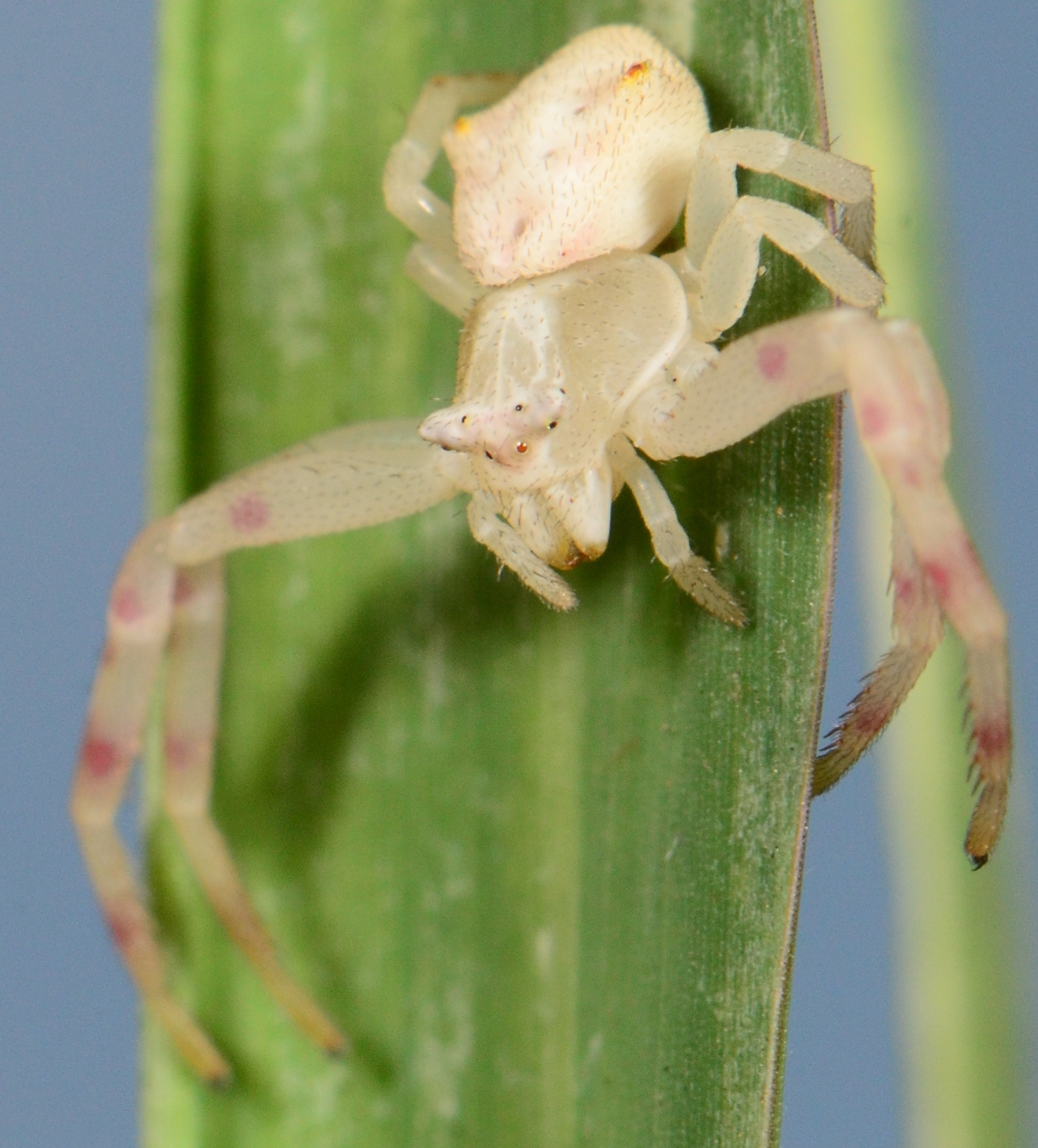
female

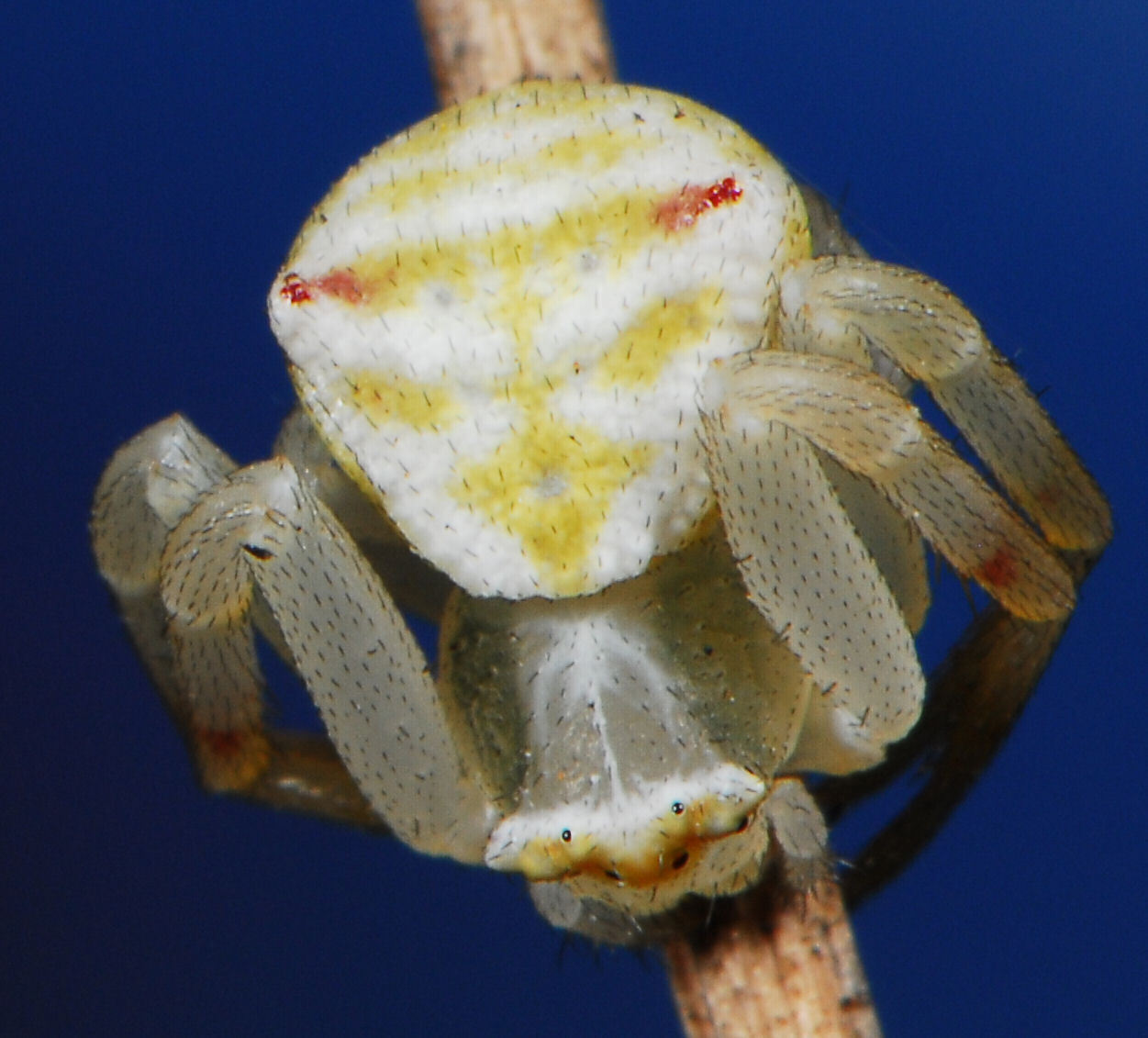
female

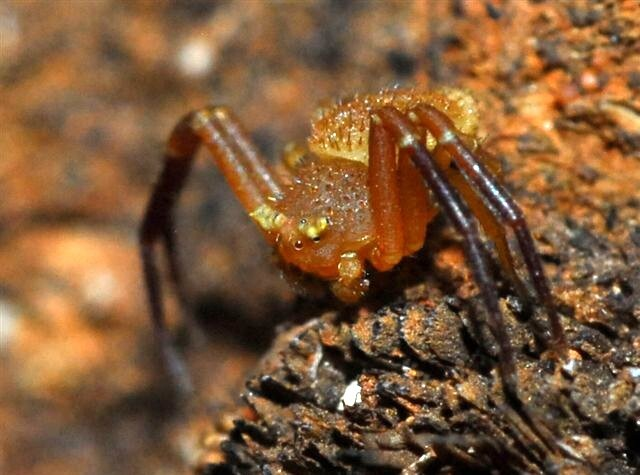
male

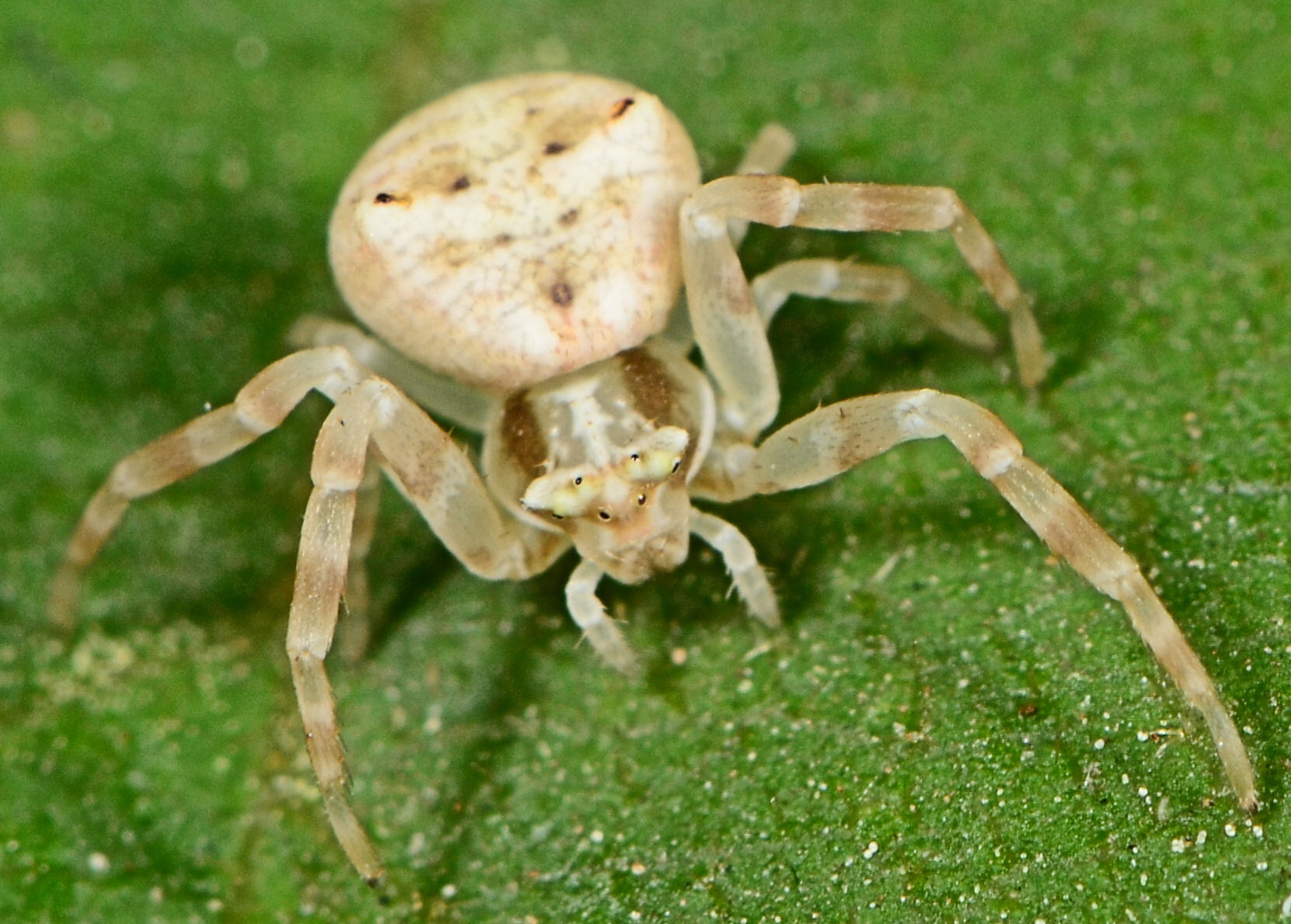
juvenile female

=== Female ===
Female Thomisus daradioides have a total length of 4.6–7.1 mm, with the cephalothorax measuring 2.0–2.6 mm in length and 2.1–2.7 mm in width. The basic coloration consists of a fawn carapace with the clypeus, chelicerae, and eye area suffused with white, and a pale brown triangular pattern between the front eyes. The opisthosoma is white with the tips of the tubercles each bearing a distinctive black spot.

The legs are the same color as the carapace, with the anterior two pairs suffused with white on the upper and outer surfaces and faintly banded. The first femur bears setae on the upper surface with darkened bases.

Color variations occur, with some specimens showing a fawn carapace with a white median line and two broad dark brown lines on the sides, while the abdominal patterns may vary from spots on tubercles to a black band between them.

The eyes are less elevated than in the related Thomisus citrinellus, with eye tubercles directed slightly upward and to the sides. The anterior eye row is recurved while the posterior row is straight, with anterior eyes equal in size. The anterior median eyes are positioned closer to each other than to the anterior lateral eyes.

The epigyne consists of two brown sclerotized circles, representing the copulatory openings.

=== Male ===
Males are considerably smaller than females, with a total length of 1.6–2.1 mm and cephalothorax measuring 0.8–1.1 mm in length and 0.9–1.2 mm in width. The carapace is yellowish brown, with legs the same color except for the first and second pairs, which have dark brown tibiae and metatarsi. The opisthosoma is paler than the carapace.

Male eye tubercles are strongly directed upward and slightly to the sides. The first and second tibiae and metatarsi lack the large setae (macro-setae) found in females, instead being clothed with long, thin dark hairs. The body is covered with numerous long, thick, erect setae.

The male pedipalp has a tegular apophysis directed toward the underside, positioned not as far down as in T. citrinellus, and the tibia bears two tubercles on the outer rear surface.

=== Juvenile ===
Juveniles are similar to females in basic coloration, with a fawn carapace and white opisthosoma, but show two distinct dots on the abdominal tubercles.

== Taxonomy ==
Thomisus daradioides was first described by Eugène Simon in 1890 based on specimens from Ethiopia.

Two species were later synonymized with T. daradioides by Dippenaar-Schoeman in 1983: Thomisus lesnei Lessert, 1936, originally described from a male specimen, and Thomisus sepiosus Lawrence, 1942, described from a female. This synonymy was established after examination of type specimens and recognition that the three names represented different sexes or variations of the same species.

== Conservation status ==
In South Africa, Thomisus daradioides is classified as Least Concern due to its wide geographical range and presence in more than 20 protected areas. No specific conservation threats have been identified for this species.
