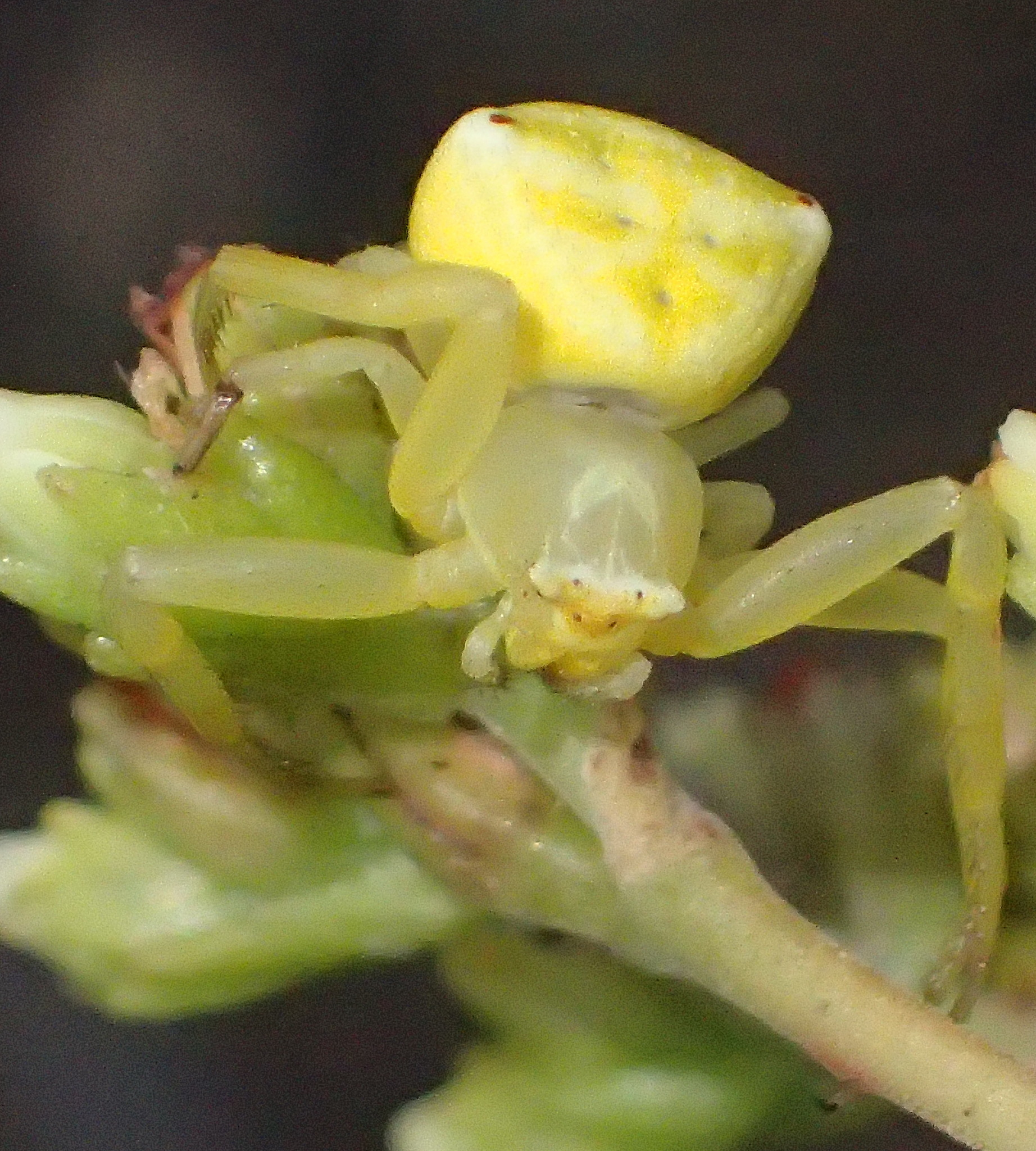
- female from South Africa
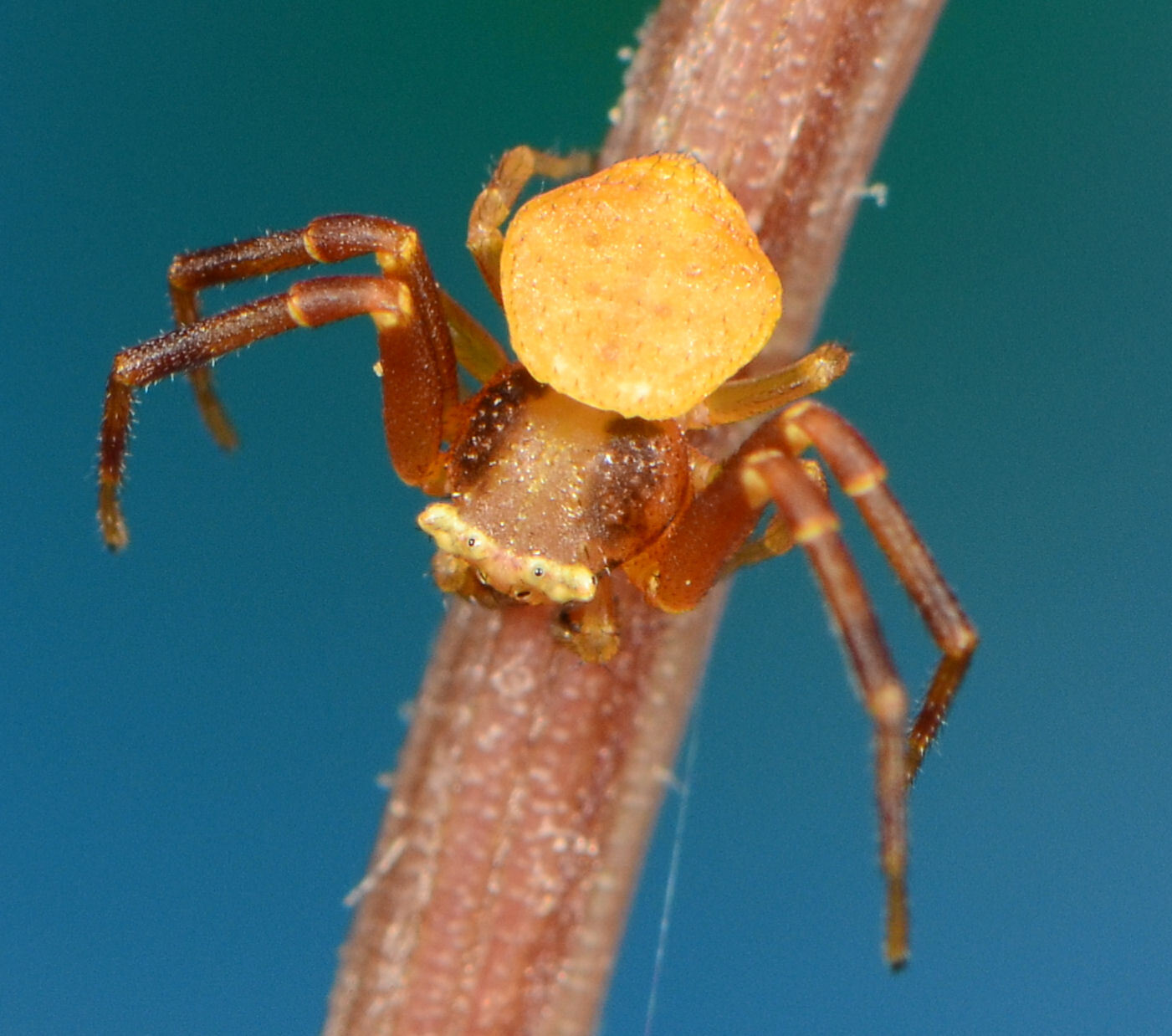
- male from South Africa

Scientific classification
- Kingdom: Animalia
- Phylum: Arthropoda
- Subphylum: Chelicerata
- Class: Arachnida
- Order: Araneae
- Infraorder: Araneomorphae
- Family: Thomisidae
- Genus: Thomisus
- Species: T. stenningi

Binomial name
- Thomisus stenningi Pocock, 1900

Synonyms
- Thomisus weberi De Lessert, 1923

= Thomisus stenningi =

Stenning's Thomisus crab spider

Species of spider

Thomisus stenningi is a species of crab spider in the genus Thomisus. It is widely distributed throughout Africa, the Seychelles, and Yemen.

== Taxonomy ==
The species was first described by Reginald Innes Pocock in 1900 from a female specimen collected at Pirie Bush, King William's Town in the Eastern Cape, South Africa. In 1923, Roger de Lessert described Thomisus weberi from a male specimen collected in the Amatola Mountains at Hogsback. Later taxonomic work by Dippenaar-Schoeman (1983) determined that these represented males and females of the same species, establishing T. weberi as a synonym of T. stenningi.

== Distribution ==
Thomisus stenningi has been recorded throughout Africa, including South Africa (all provinces), Botswana, Kenya, Tanzania, Uganda, Zambia, Zimbabwe, Angola, Guinea, and Zaire. The species also occurs in the Seychelles and Yemen.

In South Africa, the species has been extensively documented across all nine provinces, ranging from 6 to 3,337 meters above sea level.

== Habitat ==
Thomisus stenningi is a free-living species found on plants across various habitats. It has been recorded from all floral biomes in South Africa except the Desert and Succulent Karoo biomes. The species is commonly found on flowers and has been frequently collected from agricultural crops including cotton, potatoes, lucerne, strawberries, wheat, and in pistachio and pecan orchards.

== Description ==
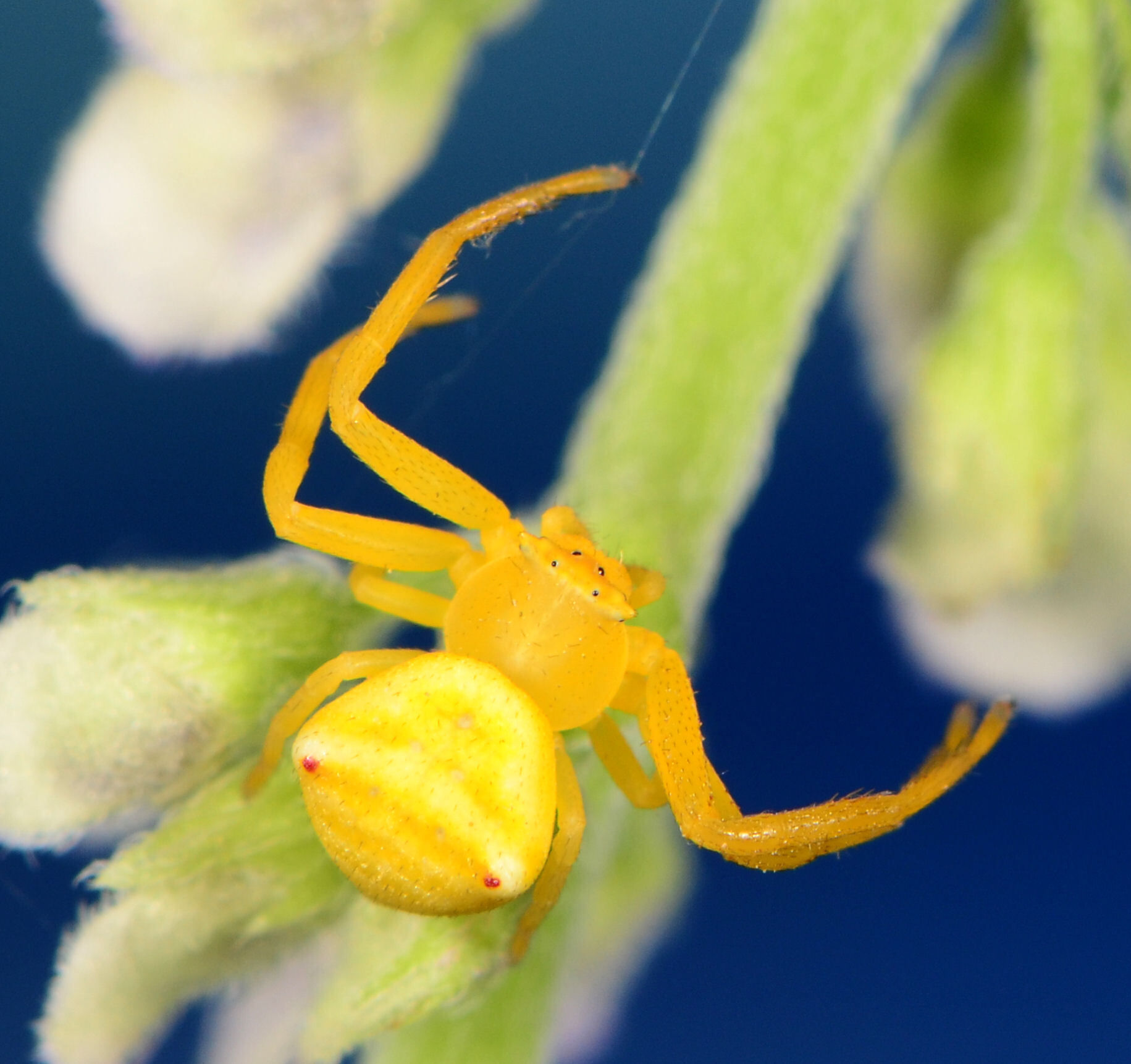
female

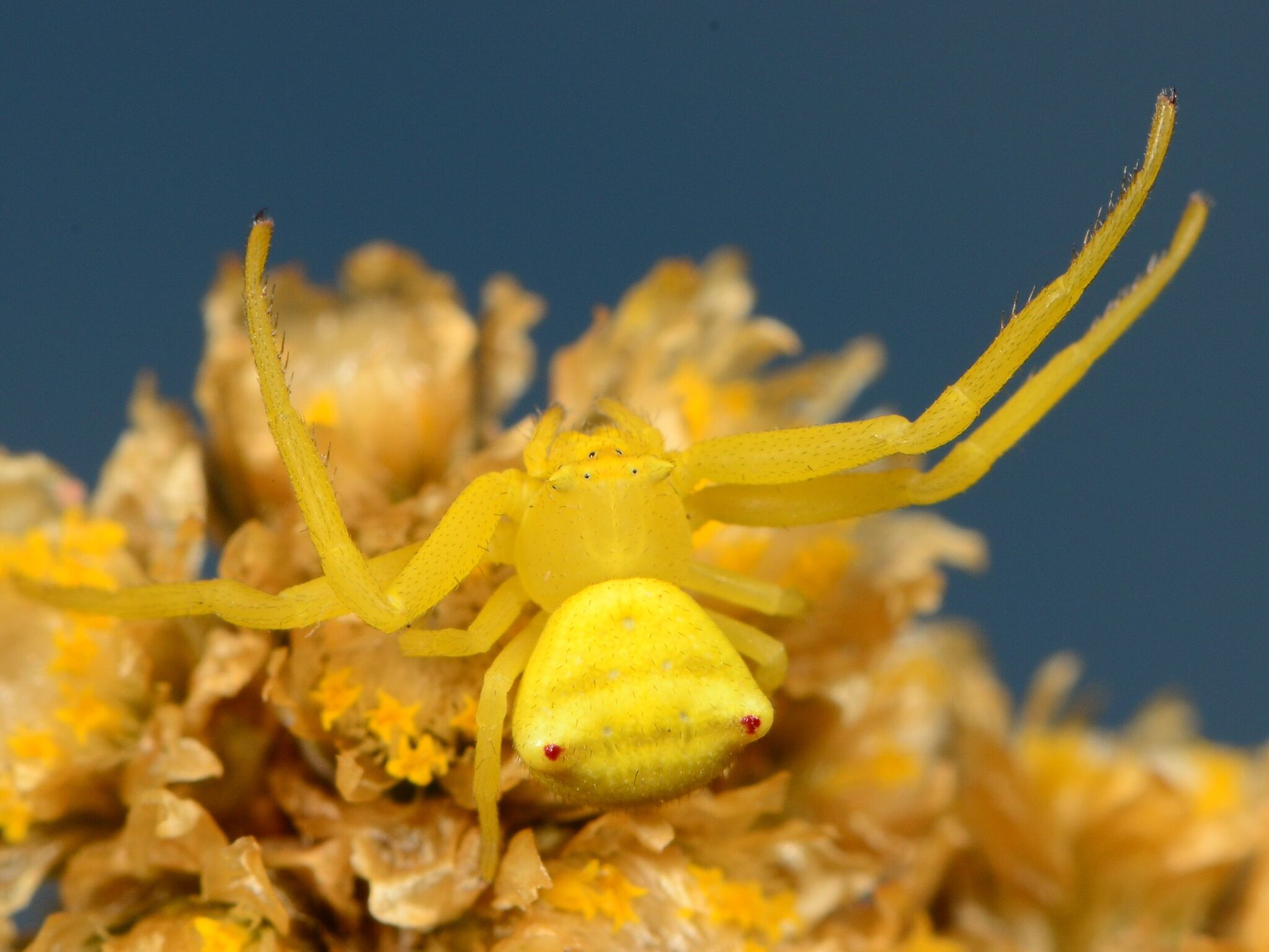
female

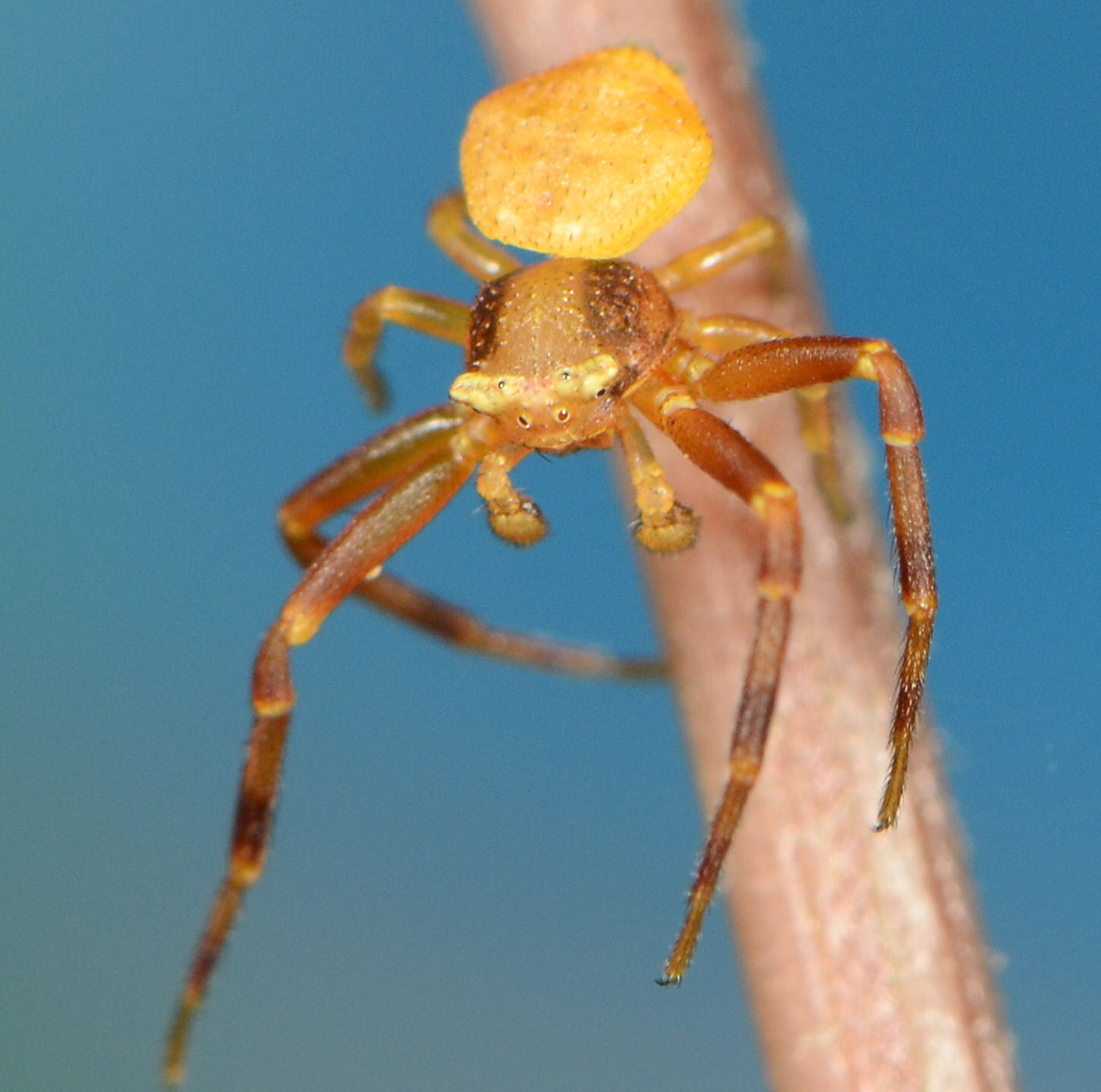
male

Females of T. stenningi are notably able to change their coloration from white to yellow, and occasionally freshly caught specimens may display a pink tint. This color-changing ability is characteristic of many crab spiders and aids in camouflage when hunting on flowers.

The species is morphologically similar to Thomisus onustus, sharing similar body shape and color-changing abilities. However, the two species can be distinguished by differences in the structure of both male and female genitalia. The embolus shape of the male pedipalp in T. stenningi is similar to that of T. boesenbergi and T. dalmasi, but differs in the presence of an apophysis on the patella.

Adults are active throughout the year, including winter months, with peak abundance occurring from October to March.
