= C10H12N2O4 =

The molecular formula C_{10}H_{12}N_{2}O_{4} (molar mass: 224.21 g/mol, exact mass: 224.0797 u) may refer to:

- 3-Hydroxykynurenine
- Stavudine
