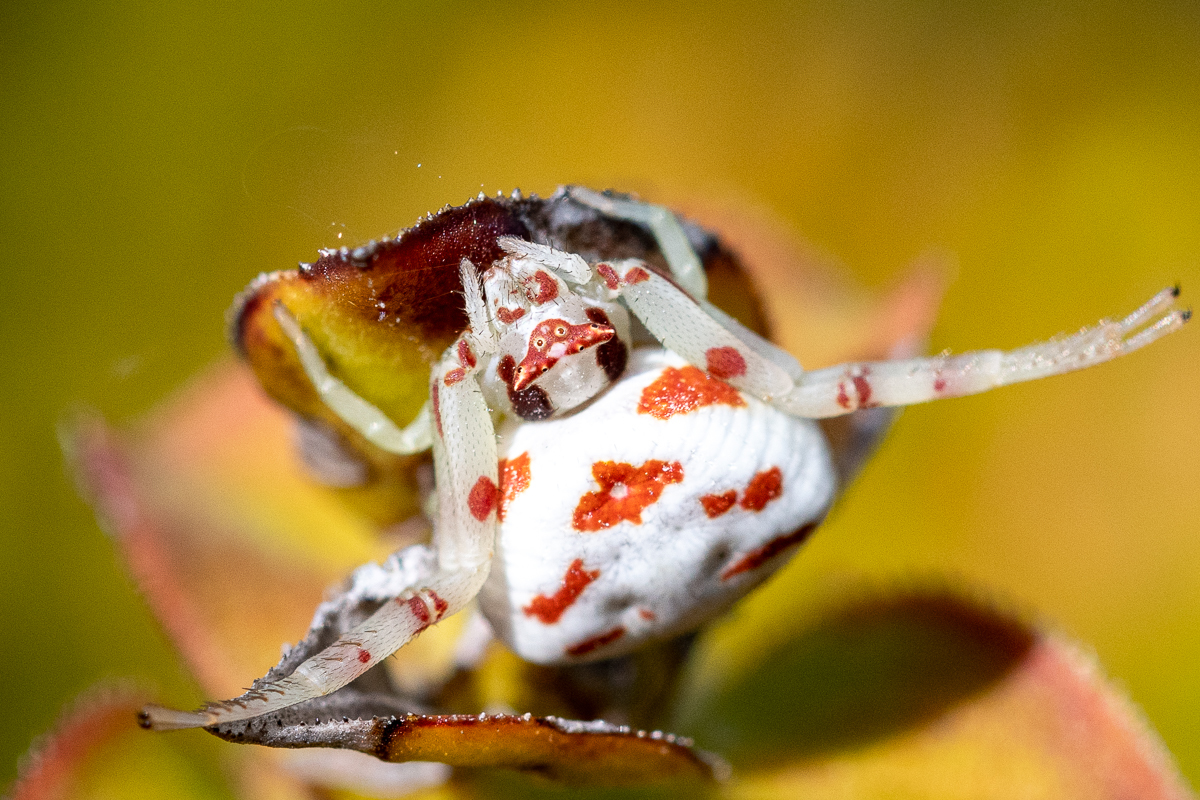
- female from near Cape Town
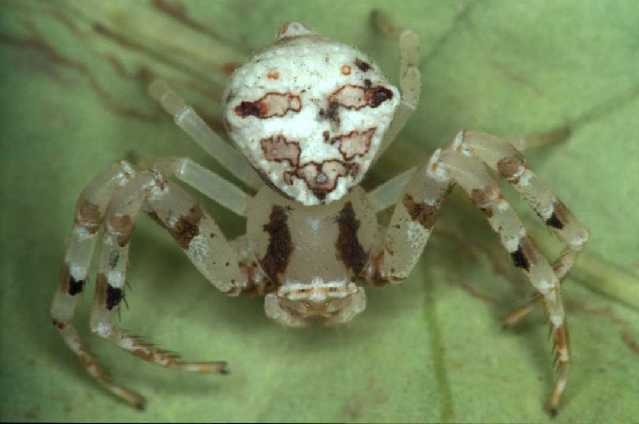
- female from South Africa

Scientific classification
- Kingdom: Animalia
- Phylum: Arthropoda
- Subphylum: Chelicerata
- Class: Arachnida
- Order: Araneae
- Infraorder: Araneomorphae
- Family: Thomisidae
- Genus: Thomisus
- Species: T. citrinellus

Binomial name
- Thomisus citrinellus Simon, 1875

Synonyms
- Thomisus spinifer O. Pickard-Cambridge, 1872 (preoccupied); Thomisus spinigerus Mello-Leitão, 1929 (replacement name); Thomisus spinifer decorata Millot, 1942 (invalid provisional name); Thomisus spinifer simoni Caporiacco, 1941; Thomisus spinifer obscurior Caporiacco, 1941; Thomisus spinifer maculitibiis Caporiacco, 1947

= Thomisus citrinellus =

Species of crab spider

Thomisus citrinellus is a species of crab spider in the family Thomisidae. It has a wide distribution across the Mediterranean, Africa, Seychelles, Yemen (including Socotra), Iraq, and possibly Iran.

== Taxonomy ==
The species was originally described by Octavius Pickard-Cambridge in 1872 as Thomisus spinifer, based on material from Palestine and Syria. However, this name was preoccupied by another spider described by John Blackwall in 1862. Eugène Simon later described Thomisus citrinellus in 1875, and this name was eventually recognized as having priority when the synonymy was resolved.

The species has a complex taxonomic history with several subspecific names that were later synonymized, including T. spinifer simoni, T. spinifer obscurior, and T. spinifer maculitibiis.

== Distribution ==
T. citrinellus has been recorded from a wide range of locations including the Mediterranean region, various parts of Africa, the Seychelles, Yemen (both mainland and Socotra Island), Iraq, and possibly Iran. The species appears to have been collected from locations as diverse as Egypt, South Africa, and the Middle East.

== Habitat ==
According to the original description, adults of both sexes and juveniles were found on low-growing plants and flowers on the plains of the Jordan River region.

== Description ==
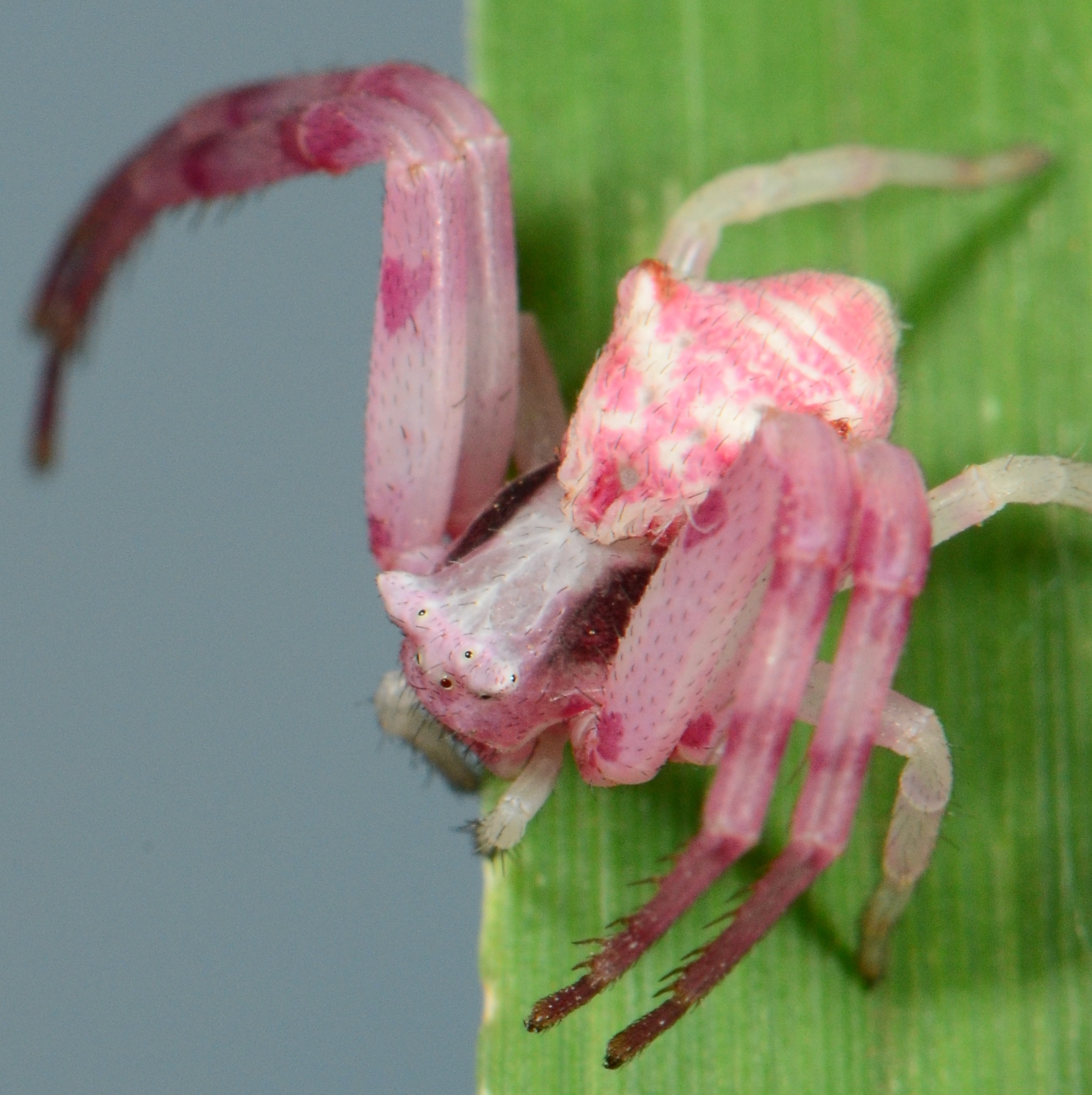
female

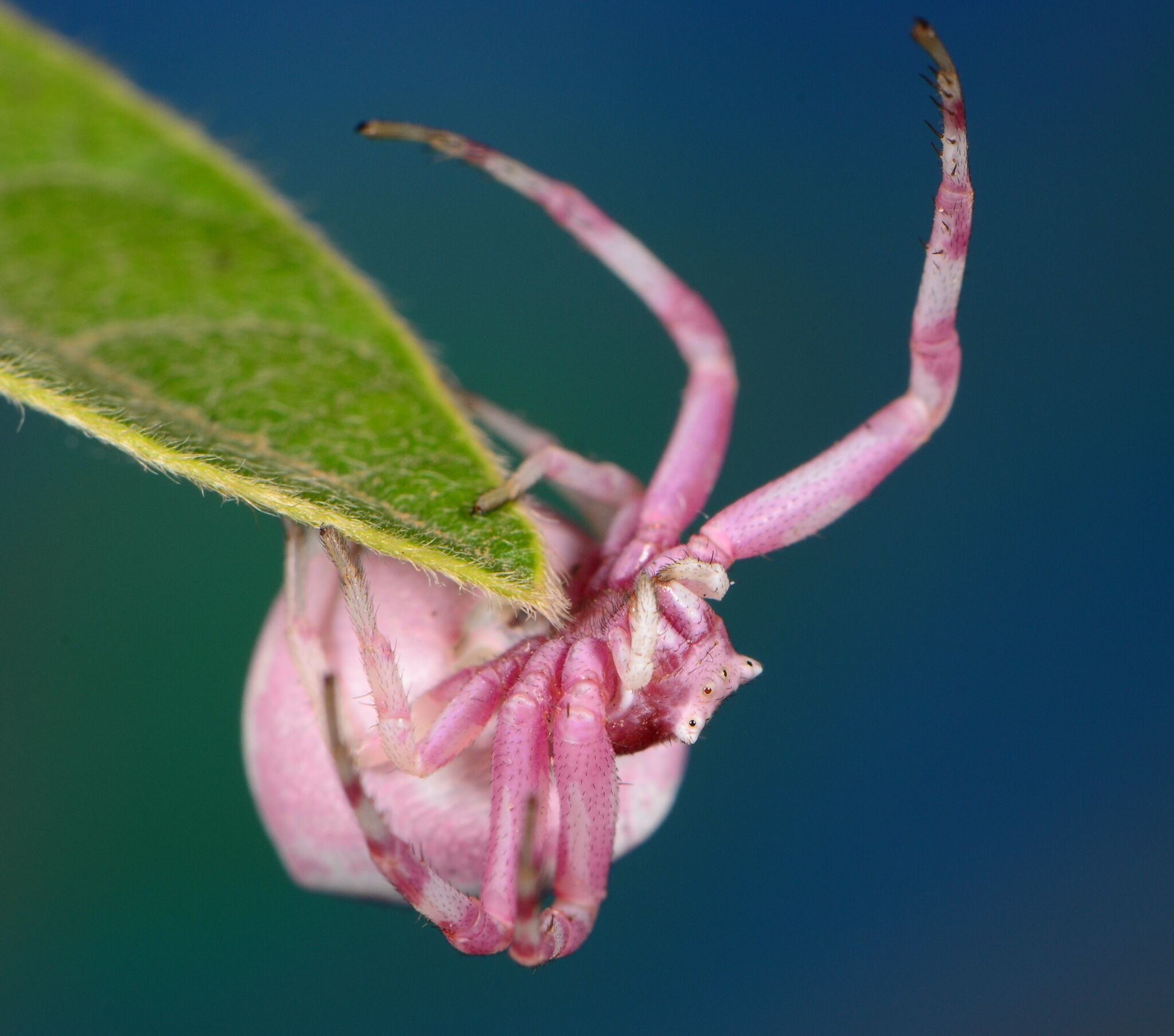
female

Males are notably smaller than females, measuring approximately about 2.6 mm in length according to the original description. The species shows considerable variation in coloration and markings.

In males, the general appearance and coloration resembles that of Thomisus onustus, but the legs are proportionally shorter. The abdomen is generally of a uniform mottled yellowish color but more oval in form. Both the abdomen and cephalothorax have yellow coloration, with the cephalothorax showing yellow-brown sides and being covered with small but conspicuous tubercles, each topped with a short, strong, pale-colored spine.

Females are considerably larger than males. The cephalothorax resembles that of males with yellow coloration, white ocular prominences and face, and broad longitudinal deep yellow-brown bands on either side. The legs are yellow with irregular cretaceous white and red-brown markings. The abdomen is strongly rounded at the rear but has a more angular front portion, showing considerable variation in coloration from pale whitish yellow to examples with brownish markings.
