= Scytodes montana =

Conservation status
- Least Concern (IUCN 3.1)

Scientific classification
- Kingdom: Animalia
- Phylum: Arthropoda
- Subphylum: Chelicerata
- Class: Arachnida
- Order: Araneae
- Infraorder: Araneomorphae
- Family: Scytodidae
- Genus: Scytodes
- Species: S. montana

Binomial name
- Scytodes montana Purcell, 1904

Species of spider

Scytodes montana is a species of spider in the family Scytodidae. It is endemic to South Africa and is commonly known as the Table Mountain spitting spider.

== Distribution ==
Scytodes montana is found only in the Western Cape Province, where it has been sampled from several localities in the Table Mountain National Park.

== Habitat and ecology ==
The species inhabits the Fynbos biome at altitudes ranging from 125 to 648 m above sea level. It is a wandering spider commonly collected from under stones and dark places on the soil surface, and has been sampled with pitfall traps.

== Description ==
The spiders are pale yellow with a distinctive carapace decorated with five black stripes. The median stripe is narrow and covers the whole carapace. The black stripes next to the median one are twice the width of the median stripe and parallel with it, extending from behind the lateral eyes to the highest point, then suddenly curving outwards to unite with the border stripes.

== Conservation ==
Scytodes montana is listed as Rare due to its restricted distribution. The species is known only from females and has a limited range within the Table Mountain National Park.

== Taxonomy ==
The species has not been revised and is known only from the female. The epigyne has been illustrated.
