= Scytodes trifoliata =

Port Shepstone Spitting Spider

Conservation status
- Least Concern (SANBI Red List)

Scientific classification
- Kingdom: Animalia
- Phylum: Arthropoda
- Subphylum: Chelicerata
- Class: Arachnida
- Order: Araneae
- Infraorder: Araneomorphae
- Family: Scytodidae
- Genus: Scytodes
- Species: S. trifoliata

Binomial name
- Scytodes trifoliata Lawrence, 1938

Species of spider

Scytodes trifoliata is a species of spider in the family Scytodidae. It is endemic to South Africa and is commonly known as the Port Shepstone spitting spider.

== Distribution ==
Scytodes trifoliata is found in three South African provinces, KwaZulu-Natal (Port Shepstone), Eastern Cape, and Mpumalanga.

== Habitat and ecology ==
The species inhabits the Indian Ocean Coastal Belt, Savanna and Thicket biomes at altitudes ranging from 52 to 197 m above sea level. It is a wandering spider commonly collected from under stones and dark places on the soil surface.

== Conservation ==
Scytodes trifoliata is listed as Least Concern by the South African National Biodiversity Institute. Although the species is known only from females, it has a wide geographical range. The species is protected in two protected areas Cwebe Nature Reserve and Kruger National Park.

== Taxonomy ==
The species has not been revised and is known only from females.
