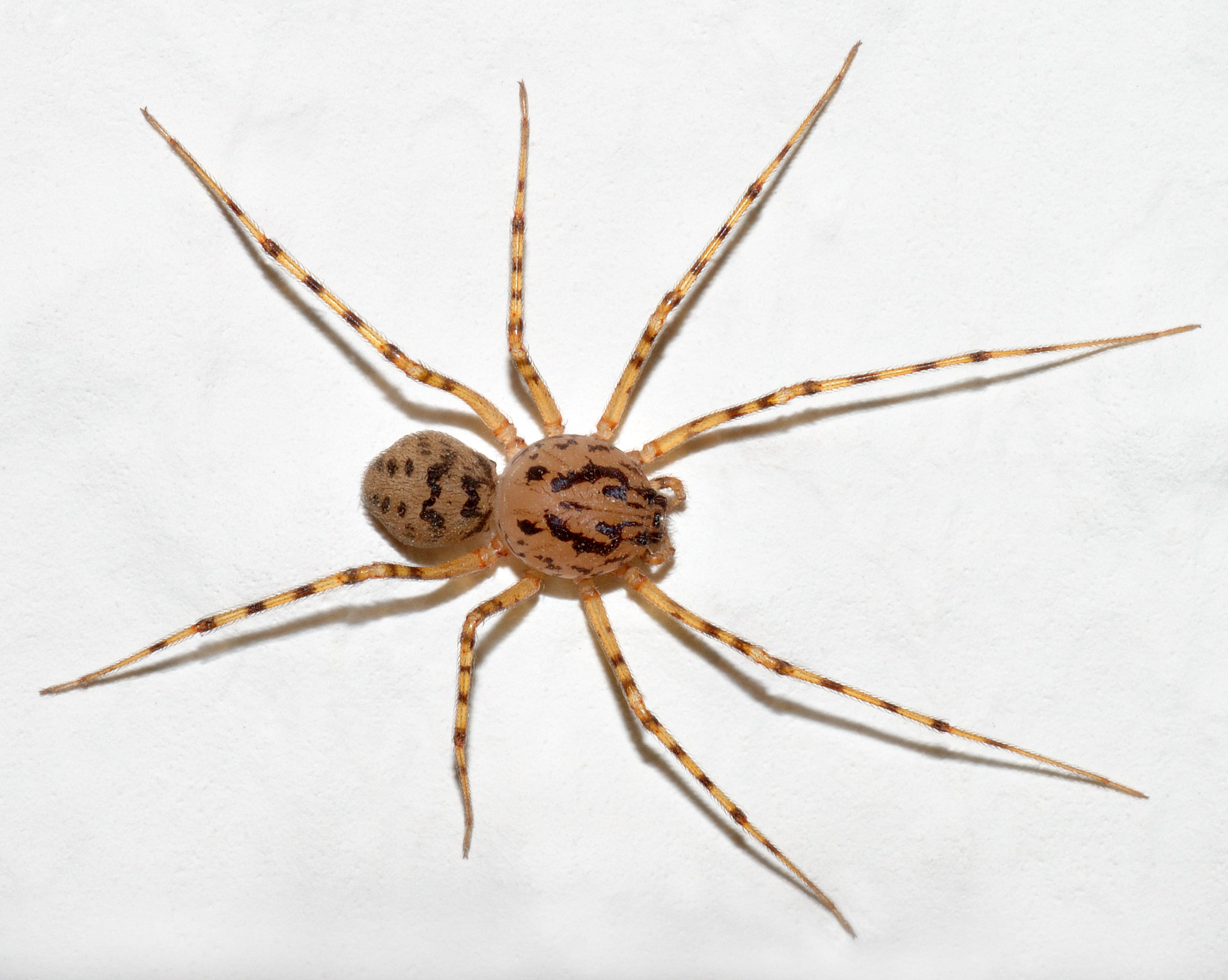
- Scytodes thoracica
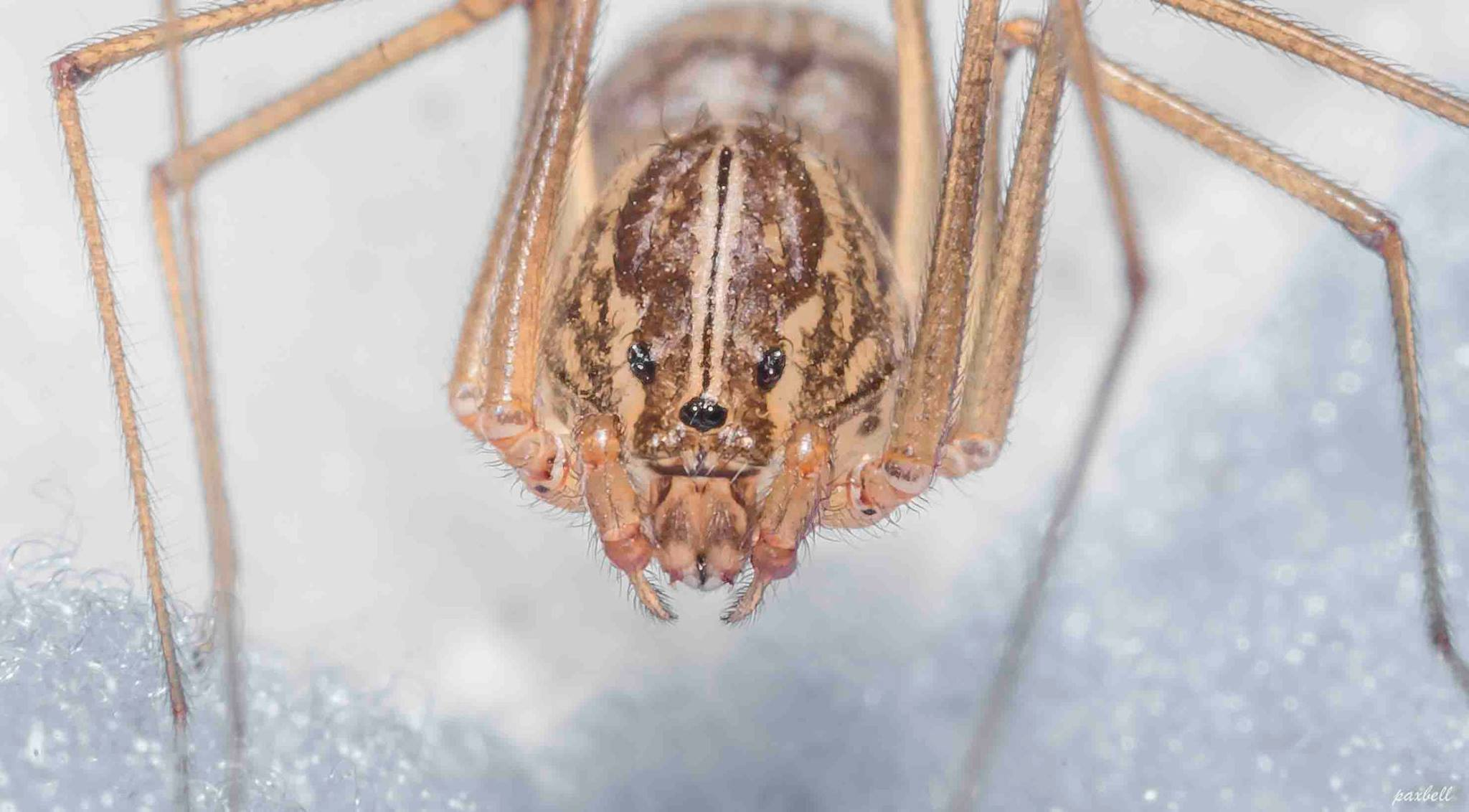
- Showing three paired eyes

Scientific classification
- Kingdom: Animalia
- Phylum: Arthropoda
- Subphylum: Chelicerata
- Class: Arachnida
- Order: Araneae
- Infraorder: Araneomorphae
- Family: Scytodidae
- Genus: Scytodes; Latreille, 1804

Type species
- Scytodes thoracica (Latreille, 1802)

Species
- 239, see text

= Scytodes =

Scytodes Temporal range: Cretaceous–Present

Genus of spiders

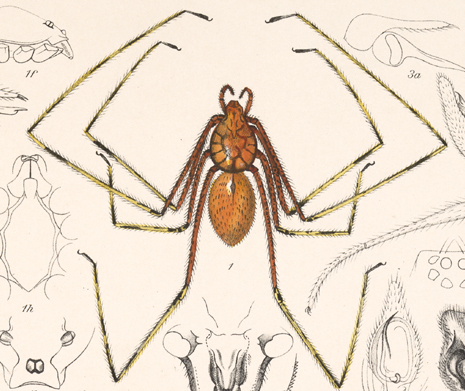
S. longipes drawn by F. O. Pickard-Cambridge

Scytodes is a genus of spitting spiders that occur all around the world, with the most widely distributed species being Scytodes thoracica, originally having a palearctic distribution but has since been introduced to North America, Argentina, India, Australia, Asia and New Zealand.

Individuals of the genus are generally characterized by their predominant pale yellow coloration and black markings on their cephalothorax compounded with long, thin hairless legs with black bands.

Like other spitting spiders, they do not build a traditional web to catch prey, but instead spit a fluid on their prey that congeals on contact into a venomous and sticky mass.

== Taxonomy ==
The first species of the genus was first described by Pierre André Latreille as Aranea thoraica in 1802 through "Histoire naturelle, générale et particulière des crustacés et des insectes" until the genus was later reclassified by Jean Victor Audouin as Scytodes in 1826.

== Appearance ==
The genus exhibits sexual dimorphism. Males range in size from 3.5 to 4 mm while females are slightly larger, from 4 to 4.5 mm. Spitting spiders have pale yellow bodies with black spots on their wide cephalothorax, and legs characterized by black bands. Scytodes species have three paired eyes for a total of six eyes. Their legs are long, slender, and have small claws attached to the chelicerae.

== Habitat ==
Scytodes species are mainly nocturnal and typically do not live in webs with the exception of some tropical species, such as Scytodes longipes. The web, however, is not used for catching prey. Instead, Scytodes species live under rocks, in crevices and can even be found living in human infrastructures.

=== Niche ===
Similar to other arachnids, Scytodes species occupy a vital role as secondary consumers (although some species, such as S. thoracica have been known to exhibit behaviour of tertiary consumers as they have been known to hunt other spiders) and work to control the populations of prey items in their habitats.

==== Distribution ====
Scytodes has a near-global distribution, being present on almost every continent excluding Antarctica. The majority of species within Europe and the Mediterranean are distributed around the 45th parallel. Scytodes enjoys a sizable presence in Asia, Oceania and North America but extremely limited presence in Africa and South America.

== Behavior ==
=== Reproduction ===
Scytodes species are typically solitary until mating or hunting due to their aggressive nature. Males are cautious when trying to find a mate. Females carry their eggs until they hatch, typically under their body or in their chelicerae. This is the most vulnerable stage in life, the egg-carrying period. Upon hatching, the juvenile spiders remain in their mother's web. They cooperatively capture and feed on prey caught in the web. Upon reaching sexual maturity, the young spiders leave the web, move a short distance away and exhibit solitary behavior.

Sociality and parental care

Scytodes species are known to perform a wide range of social organization, with some species being solitary, subsocial, communal-territorial, or social. Many of the subsocial and colonial species are known to give extended parental care, such as S. fusca, S. socialis, S. longipes, and S. intricata.

Females will sparsely wrap their eggs in a sac, and hold it in its chelicerae until they hatch, sometimes dropping the egg sac to capture prey, after which they return and feed beside the eggs, picking them up again once finished. This behaviour protects the eggs from desiccation, mould, parasites, and predation.

Some species are subsocial and after hatching, the spiderlings will often cohabitate with their mother until a certain instar is reached, but some may stay longer or leave earlier. During this period the spiderling and adult will hunt prey, but not spit at or prey on each other. The mothers will sometimes take captured prey to the spiderlings. S. indet(a) and S. indet(b) will often share the meal with their spiderlings, but S. fusca will not, eating separate meals away from the spiderlings. Cohabitating spiderlings will work together to capture large prey, but will hunt small prey individually. Conflict between spiderlings occurs in some species at early instars, but cannibalistic behaviour only arises in later instars of those species.

S. socialis is known to be a social species, and individuals will continue cohabitation into adulthood, forming colonies, in which individuals show no aggression to each other and share prey.

=== Hunting ===
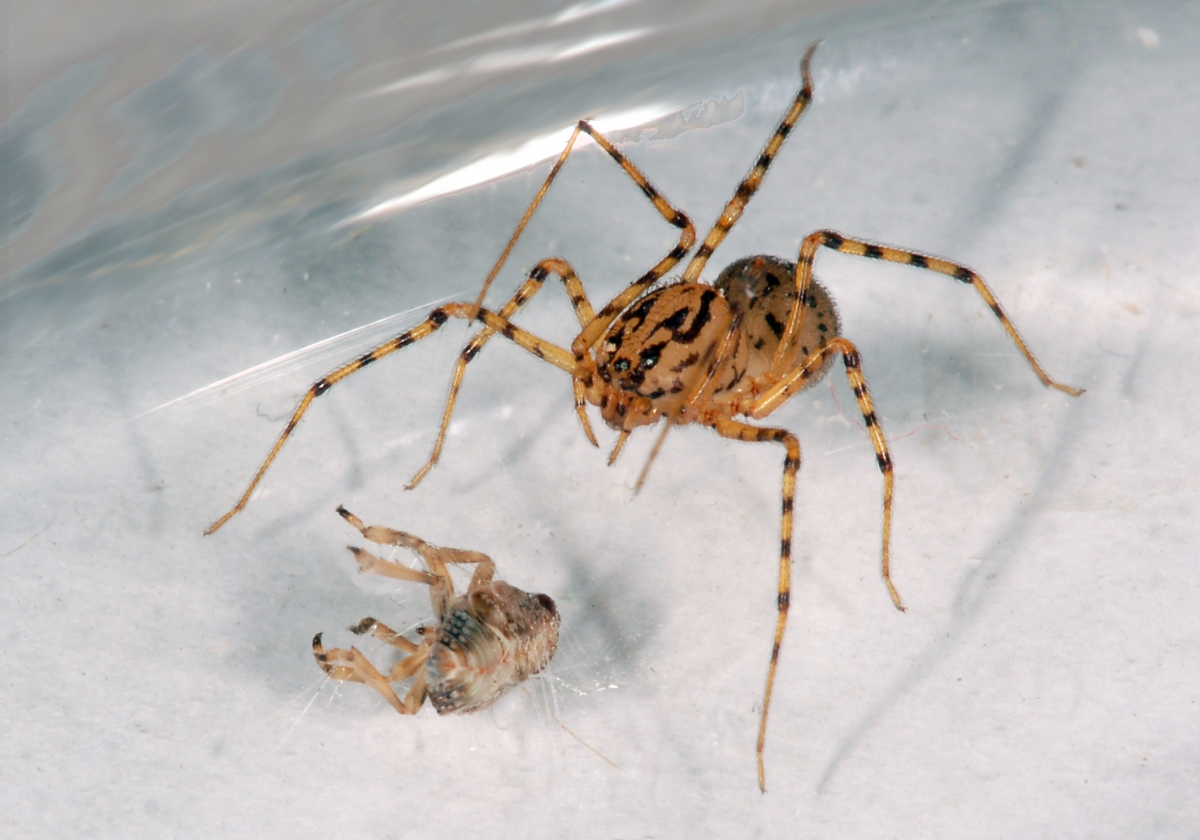
Scytodes thoracica in front of prey

Scytodes species primarily detect prey by vibration and smell. They will spit at prey until it is subdued. Once the prey is subdued, they wrap the prey in silk, and feed. When prey flees, Scytodes will sometimes pursue it, and spit web once it gets close. Prey often gets glued to substrate by the spit, and the spider will cut it loose from the substrate to wrap it. Sometimes when prey struggles during wrapping, or immediately after spitting web, the spider will quickly lunge and stab the prey with its fangs, retracting them immediately. Many species are known to be araneophagic, with some preferring to prey on other spiders.

Hunting dangerous prey such as other spiders is thought to lead to behavioural flexibility, which can be observed in Scytodes, which will adjust their hunting methods based on prey size.

S. pallida (and/or possibly S. indet(a)) shares an interesting relationship with the jumping spider Portia labiata, in which both are each other's primary prey. These spiders do not die post-mating; males live 1.5–2 years and females live 2 to 4 years.

==== Webs ====
Some species of Scytodes are known to build webs. Webs of many species consist of a sheet of web connected to a small tubular shelter, in which the spider tends to reside.

=== Spitting ===
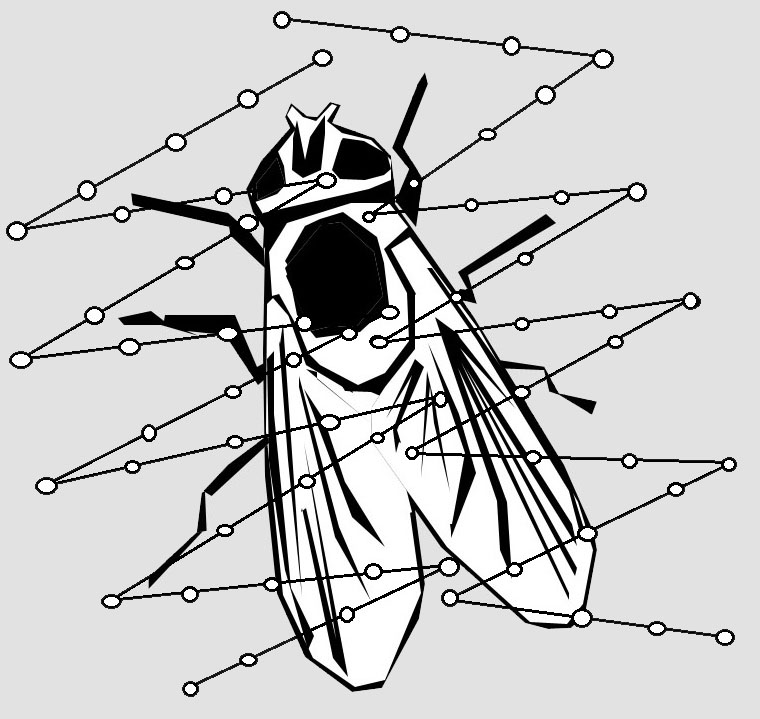
Pattern of Scytodes glue that is spit on prey and how glue pins prey to ground

The spitting from which its common name derives is used as a method of trapping prey or escaping predators. Scytodes glue is made in a large gland in the cephalothorax where venom is synthesized in the front of the gland and the glue is produced in the back of gland. Sticky glue is expelled from their fangs from a small opening in their chelicerae and can be shot up to 4 -10 body lengths from the spider. Scytodes spit their glue in a zigzag pattern to trap their prey to a substrate. Though, for many years it was thought that the glue contained venom that diffused into the prey, researchers now believe that the glue does not contain any toxic properties. Once the whole prey is trapped to the ground, the spider then bites the prey with a venomous bite to kill it.

=== Diet ===
Scytodes primarily feed on soft bodied insects such as moths, other spiders, mosquitoes, silverfish and crickets. They typically hunt their prey, however scavenging behaviour has been observed to happen rarely. When scavenging occurs a spider will not spit on the prey as the glue is energetically expensive to produce.

== Fossil record ==
One of the oldest fossils of an extinct species of Scytodes is Scytodes weitschati (Wunderlich 1993) found in Baltic amber dating to the Eocene 43 million years ago. Its morphology is similar to that of Scytodes seen today.

== Species ==
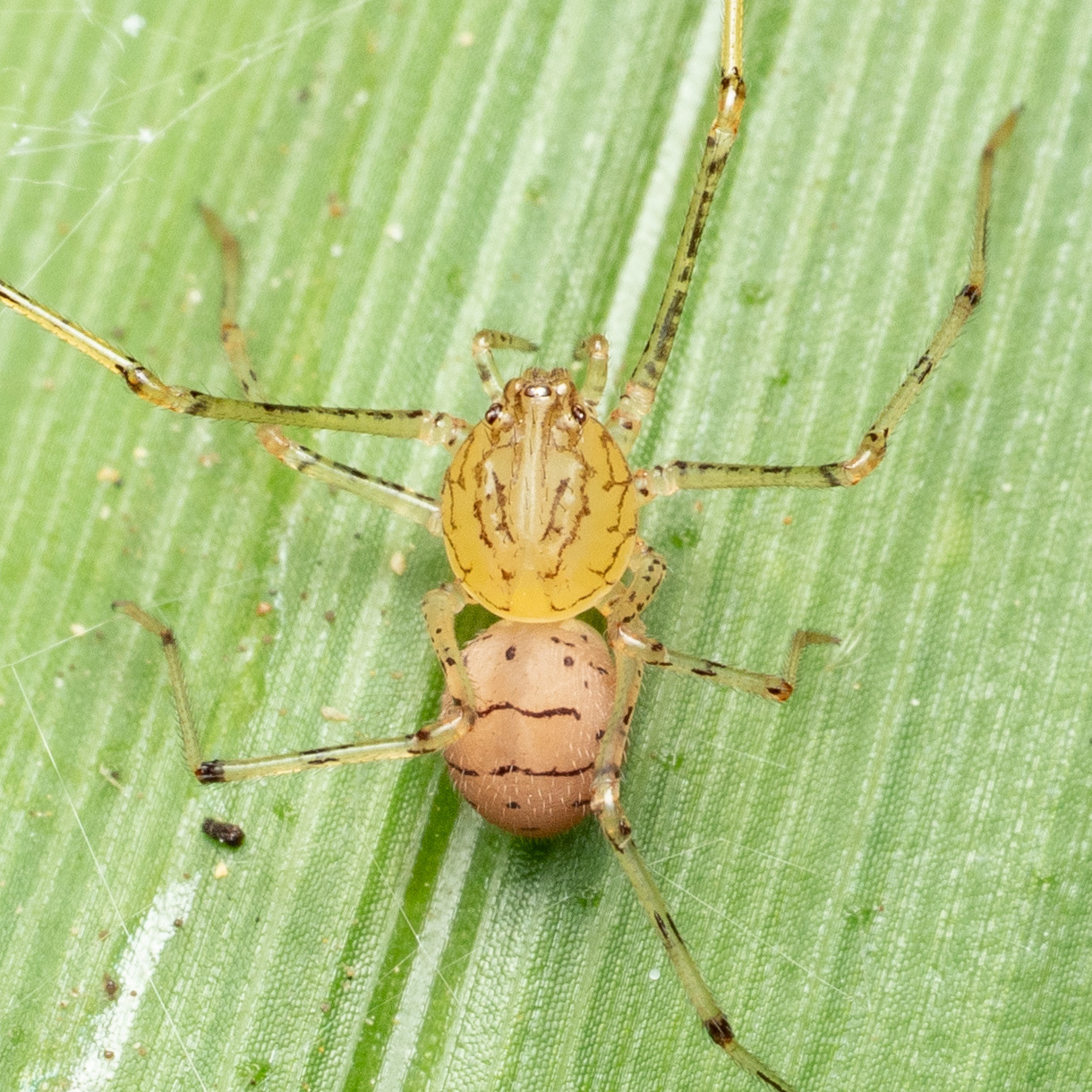
S. armata

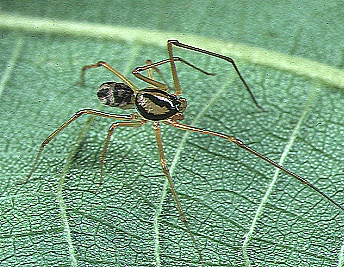
Male S. fusca

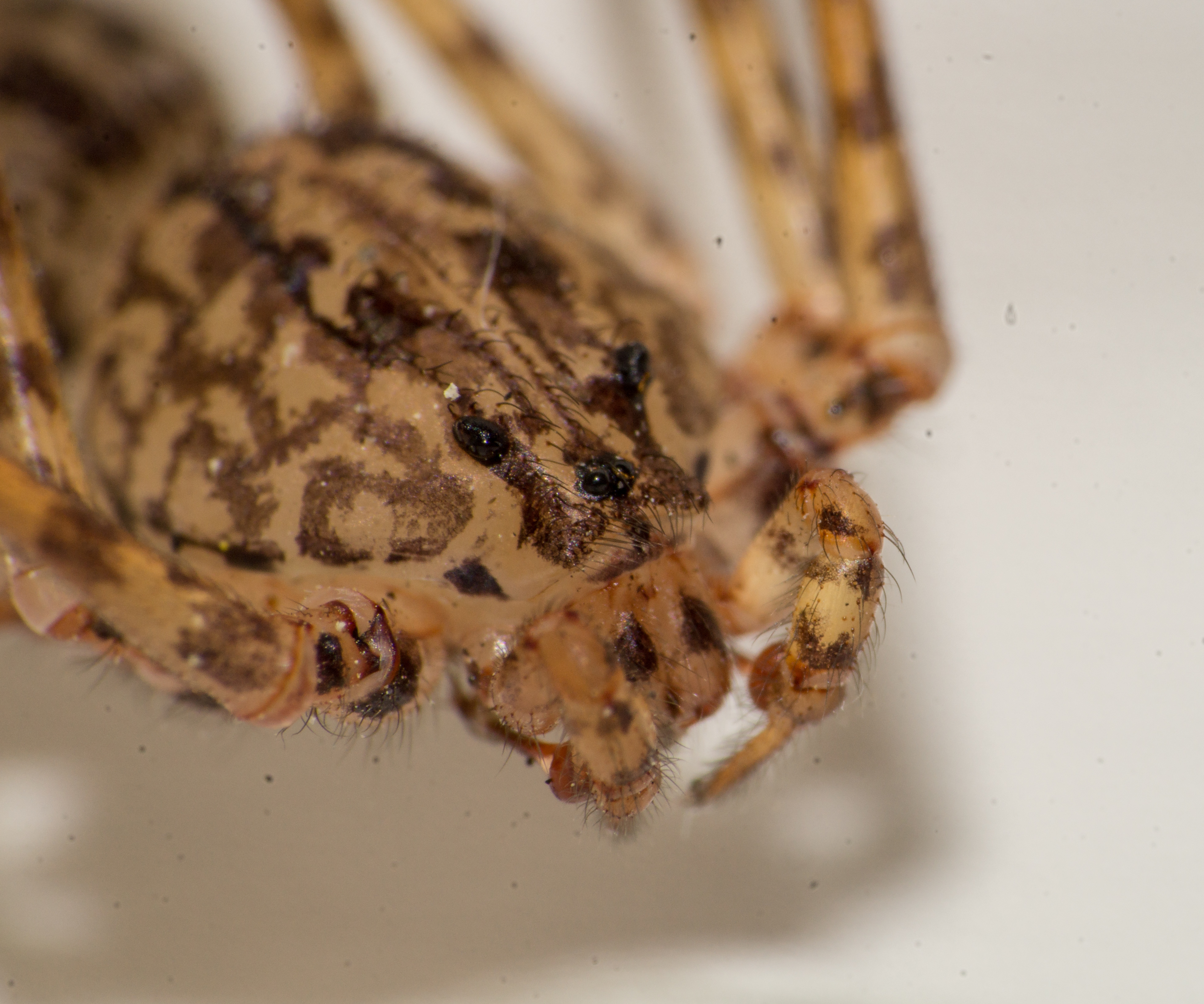
S. glabula

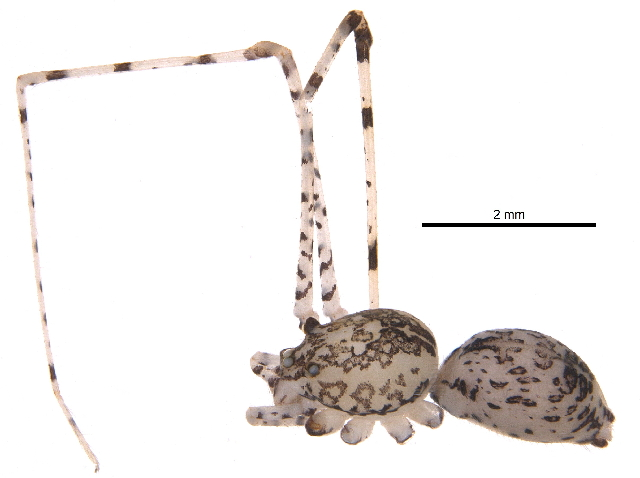
S. intricata

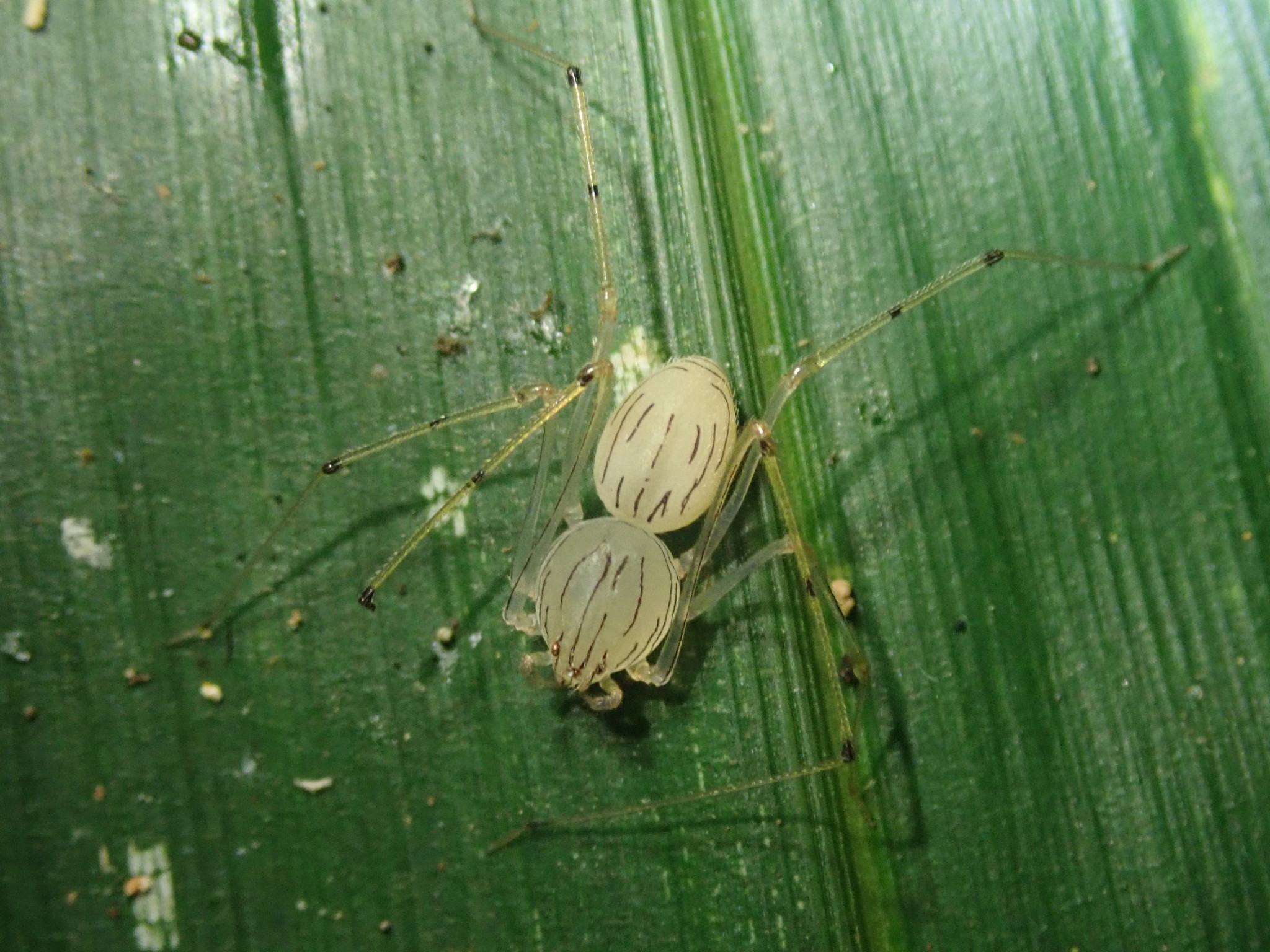
S. pallida

As of February 2026, this genus includes 239 species and one subspecies.

Species with articles on Wikipedia:

- Scytodes arenacea Purcell, 1904 – Namibia, South Africa
- Scytodes armata Brescovit & Rheims, 2001 – Costa Rica
- Scytodes broomi Pocock, 1902 – Namibia, South Africa
- Scytodes caffra Purcell, 1904 – DR Congo, South Africa, Eswatini
- Scytodes cedri Purcell, 1904 – South Africa
- Scytodes clavata Benoit, 1965 – DR Congo, South Africa
- Scytodes constellata Lawrence, 1938 – South Africa
- Scytodes drakensbergensis Lawrence, 1947 – South Africa
- Scytodes elizabethae Purcell, 1904 – South Africa
- Scytodes flagellata Purcell, 1904 – South Africa
- Scytodes fusca Walckenaer, 1837 – North to South America. Introduced to St. Helena, Europe, Africa, Seychelles, India, Myanmar, Indonesia, China, Japan, Hawaii
- Scytodes globula Nicolet, 1849 – Bolivia, Brazil, Uruguay, Chile, Argentina
- Scytodes gooldi Purcell, 1904 – South Africa
- Scytodes karrooica Purcell, 1904 – South Africa
- Scytodes kumonga Zamani & Marusik, 2020 – Oman, Iran
- Scytodes lanceolata Purcell, 1904 – South Africa
- Scytodes lawrencei Lessert, 1939 – DR Congo, South Africa
- Scytodes leipoldti Purcell, 1904 – South Africa
- Scytodes longipes Lucas, 1844 – Central and South America. Introduced to Guinea, DR Congo, Indonesia (New Guinea), Japan, Australia (Queensland), Pacific Is. Hawaii
- Scytodes lycosella Purcell, 1904 – South Africa
- Scytodes lyriformis Purcell, 1904 – South Africa
- Scytodes maritima Lawrence, 1938 – South Africa
- Scytodes marshalli Pocock, 1902 – South Africa
- Scytodes montana Purcell, 1904 – South Africa
- Scytodes pallida Doleschall, 1859 – India, China, Philippines, Indonesia (Moluccas, New Guinea)
- Scytodes quinqua Lawrence, 1927 – Namibia, South Africa
- Scytodes rubra Lawrence, 1937 – South Africa
- Scytodes schultzei Purcell, 1908 – South Africa
- Scytodes silvatica Purcell, 1904 – South Africa
- Scytodes subulata Purcell, 1904 – South Africa
- Scytodes symmetrica Lawrence, 1938 – South Africa
- Scytodes testudo Purcell, 1904 – South Africa
- Scytodes thoracica (Latreille, 1802) – Europe, North Africa, Turkey, Iran, temperate Asia to China, Korea, Japan. Introduced to North America, Argentina, South Africa, India, Australia, New Zealand (type species)
- Scytodes triangulifera Purcell, 1904 – South Africa
- Scytodes trifoliata Lawrence, 1938 – South Africa
- Scytodes univittata Simon, 1882 – Turkmenistan, Kyrgyzstan, India. Introduced to Hawaii, Mexico, Cuba, Venezuela, Brazil, Paraguay, Chile, Ascension Island, Cape Verde, Canary Islands, Morocco, Spain, Italy, Cyprus, Egypt, Iraq, Iran
- Scytodes venusta (Thorell, 1890) – Sri Lanka to Indonesia (Java)

Complete list of species as of February 2026
- S. adisi Rheims & Brescovit, 2009 – Brazil
- S. aethiopica Simon, 1907 – Ethiopia
- S. affinis Kulczyński, 1901 – Ethiopia
- S. aharonii Strand, 1914 – Israel
- S. akytaba Rheims & Brescovit, 2006 – Brazil
- S. alayoi Alayón, 1977 – Mexico, Cuba
- S. albiapicalis Strand, 1907 – China
- S. alcomitzli Rheims, Brescovit & Durán-Barrón, 2007 – Mexico
- S. alfredi Gajbe, 2004 – India
- S. altamira Rheims & Brescovit, 2000 – Brazil
- S. amazonica Dupérré & Tapia, 2023 – Ecuador
- S. annulipes Simon, 1907 – Morocco, Algeria, Tunisia, Libya
- S. antonina Rheims & Brescovit, 2009 – Brazil
- S. apuecatu Rheims & Brescovit, 2006 – Brazil
- S. arboricola Millot, 1946 – Ivory Coast
- S. arenacea Purcell, 1904 – Namibia, South Africa
- S. argelia Dupérré & Tapia, 2023 – Ecuador
- S. armata Brescovit & Rheims, 2001 – Costa Rica
- S. aruensis Strand, 1911 – Indonesia (Aru Is.)
- S. arwa Rheims, Brescovit & van Harten, 2006 – Yemen, Oman, Iran
- S. atlacamani Rheims, Brescovit & Durán-Barrón, 2007 – Mexico
- S. atlacoya Rheims, Brescovit & Durán-Barrón, 2007 – Mexico
- S. atlatonin Rheims, Brescovit & Durán-Barrón, 2007 – Mexico
- S. auricula Rheims & Brescovit, 2000 – Ecuador, Brazil
- S. ayampe Dupérré & Tapia, 2023 – Ecuador
- S. balbina Rheims & Brescovit, 2000 – Brazil
- S. becki Rheims & Brescovit, 2001 – Brazil
- S. bertheloti Lucas, 1838 – Mediterranean, Turkmenistan
- S. blanda Bryant, 1940 – Cuba
- S. bocaina Rheims & Brescovit, 2009 – Brazil
- S. bonito Rheims & Brescovit, 2009 – Brazil
- S. brignolii Rheims & Brescovit, 2009 – Brazil
- S. broomi Pocock, 1902 – Namibia, South Africa
- S. brunnea González-Sponga, 2004 – Venezuela
- S. caffra Purcell, 1904 – DR Congo, South Africa, Eswatini
- S. caipora Rheims & Brescovit, 2004 – Brazil
- S. camerunensis Strand, 1906 – Cameroon
- S. canariensis Wunderlich, 1987 – Canary Islands
- S. caratinga Rheims & Brescovit, 2009 – Brazil
- S. caure Rheims & Brescovit, 2004 – Brazil
- S. cavernarum Roewer, 1962 – Malaysia
- S. cedri Purcell, 1904 – South Africa
- S. cellularis Simon, 1907 – DR Congo
- S. championi F. O. Pickard-Cambridge, 1899 – Mexico, Brazil
- S. chantico Rheims, Brescovit & Durán-Barrón, 2007 – Mexico
- S. chapeco Rheims & Brescovit, 2009 – Brazil
- S. chiconahui Rheims, Brescovit & Durán-Barrón, 2007 – Mexico
- S. chiquimula Brescovit & Rheims, 2001 – Guatemala
- S. choco Dupérré & Tapia, 2023 – Ecuador
- S. chopim Rheims & Brescovit, 2009 – Brazil
- S. clavata Benoit, 1965 – DR Congo, South Africa
- S. cogu Brescovit & Rheims, 2001 – Costa Rica
- S. congoanus Strand, 1908 – Congo
- S. constellata Lawrence, 1938 – South Africa
- S. coronata Thorell, 1899 – West Africa
- S. costa Dupérré & Tapia, 2023 – Ecuador
- S. cotopitoka Rheims, Barreiros, Brescovit & Bonaldo, 2005 – Brazil
- S. cubensis Alayón, 1977 – Cuba, Trinidad
- S. curimaguana González-Sponga, 2004 – Venezuela
- S. curupira Rheims & Brescovit, 2004 – Brazil
- S. darlingtoni Alayón, 1977 – Cuba
- S. diminuta Valerio, 1981 – Costa Rica
- S. dissimulans Petrunkevitch, 1929 – Puerto Rico
- S. dollfusi Millot, 1941 – Ivory Coast
- S. domhelvecio Rheims & Brescovit, 2009 – Brazil
- S. dorothea Gertsch, 1935 – United States
- S. drakensbergensis Lawrence, 1947 – South Africa
- S. eleonorae Rheims & Brescovit, 2001 – Brazil
- S. elizabethae Purcell, 1904 – South Africa
- S. farri Alayón, 1985 – Jamaica
- S. flagellata Purcell, 1904 – South Africa
- S. florifera Yin & Xu, 2012 – China
- S. fourchei Lessert, 1939 – DR Congo
- S. fusca Walckenaer, 1837 – North, South America. Introduced to St. Helena, Europe, Africa, Seychelles, India, Myanmar, Indonesia, China, Japan, Hawaii
- S. genebra Rheims & Brescovit, 2009 – Brazil
- S. gertschi Valerio, 1981 – Panama
- S. gilva (Thorell, 1887) – India, Myanmar
- S. globula Nicolet, 1849 – Bolivia, Brazil, Uruguay, Chile, Argentina
- S. gooldi Purcell, 1904 – South Africa
- S. grammocephala Simon, 1909 – Vietnam
- S. guapiassu Rheims & Brescovit, 2009 – Brazil
- S. guttipes Simon, 1893 – Venezuela, Trinidad
- S. hahahae Rheims & Brescovit, 2001 – Brazil
- S. humilis L. Koch, 1875 – Ethiopia
- S. iabaday Rheims & Brescovit, 2001 – Brazil
- S. iara Rheims & Brescovit, 2004 – Brazil
- S. ilhota Rheims & Brescovit, 2009 – Brazil
- S. imbituba Rheims & Brescovit, 2009 – Brazil
- S. immaculata L. Koch, 1875 – Egypt, Greece
- S. insperata Soares & Camargo, 1948 – Brazil
- S. intricata Banks, 1909 – Mexico, Costa Rica
- S. itabaiana Rheims & Brescovit, 2009 – Brazil
- S. itacuruassu Rheims & Brescovit, 2006 – Brazil
- S. itapecerica Rheims & Brescovit, 2009 – Brazil
- S. itapevi Brescovit & Rheims, 2000 – Brazil
- S. itzana Chamberlin & Ivie, 1938 – Mexico
- S. itzli Rheims, Brescovit & Durán-Barrón, 2007 – Mexico
- S. jaguar Dupérré & Tapia, 2023 – Ecuador
- S. janauari Brescovit & Höfer, 1999 – Brazil
- S. jousseaumei Simon, 1907 – Djibouti
- S. jurubatuba Rheims & Brescovit, 2009 – Brazil
- S. jurupari Rheims & Brescovit, 2004 – Brazil
- S. jyapara Rheims & Brescovit, 2006 – Brazil
- S. kaokoensis Lawrence, 1928 – Namibia
- S. karrooica Purcell, 1904 – South Africa
- S. kinsukus Patel, 1975 – India
- S. kinzelbachi Wunderlich, 1995 – Turkey, Jordan
- S. kumonga Zamani & Marusik, 2020 – Oman, Iran
- S. lanceolata Purcell, 1904 – South Africa
- S. lawrencei Lessert, 1939 – DR Congo, South Africa
- S. leipoldti Purcell, 1904 – South Africa
- S. leprosula Strand, 1913 – Central Africa
- S. lesserti Millot, 1941 – Guinea
- S. lewisi Alayón, 1985 – Jamaica
- S. lineatipes Taczanowski, 1874 – St. Vincent, Bonaire, Venezuela, French Guiana
- S. liui Wang, 1994 – China
- S. loja Dupérré & Tapia, 2023 – Ecuador
- S. longipes Lucas, 1844 – Central America and South America. Introduced to Guinea, DR Congo, Indonesia (New Guinea), Japan, Australia (Queensland), Pacific Islands, Hawaii
- S. lorenzoi Alayón, 1977 – Cuba
- S. luteola Simon, 1893 – Venezuela
- S. lycosella Purcell, 1904 – South Africa
- S. lyriformis Purcell, 1904 – South Africa
- S. major Simon, 1886 – Africa
- S. mangabeiras Rheims & Brescovit, 2009 – Brazil
- S. mapia Rheims & Brescovit, 2000 – Brazil
- S. mapinguari Rheims & Brescovit, 2004 – Brazil
- S. maquine Rheims & Brescovit, 2009 – Brazil
- S. maresi Rheims & Brescovit, 2001 – Brazil
- S. maritima Lawrence, 1938 – South Africa
- S. marlieria Rheims & Brescovit, 2009 – Brazil
- S. maromba Rheims & Brescovit, 2009 – Brazil
- S. marshalli Pocock, 1902 – South Africa
- S. martiusi Brescovit & Höfer, 1999 – Brazil
- S. mawphlongensis Tikader, 1966 – India, Nepal, Thailand
- S. mayahuel Rheims, Brescovit & Durán-Barrón, 2007 – Mexico
- S. minus Dupérré & Tapia, 2023 – Ecuador
- S. montana Purcell, 1904 – South Africa
- S. monticola González-Sponga, 2004 – Venezuela
- S. multilineata Thorell, 1899 – West, Central Africa
- S. nambiobyrassu Rheims & Brescovit, 2009 – Brazil
- S. nambiussu Rheims & Brescovit, 2006 – Brazil
- S. nanahuatzin Rheims, Brescovit & Durán-Barrón, 2007 – Mexico
- S. nigristernis Simon, 1907 – Guinea-Bissau
- S. noeli Alayón, 1977 – Cuba
- S. obelisci Denis, 1947 – Egypt
- S. opoxtli Rheims, Brescovit & Durán-Barrón, 2007 – Mexico
- S. orellana Dupérré & Tapia, 2023 – Ecuador
- S. oswaldi Lenz, 1891 – Madagascar
- S. paarmanni Brescovit & Höfer, 1999 – Brazil
- S. pallida Doleschall, 1859 – India, China, Philippines, Indonesia (Moluccas, New Guinea)
- S. panamensis Brescovit & Rheims, 2001 – Panama
- S. panguana Brescovit & Höfer, 1999 – Peru
- S. paramera González-Sponga, 2004 – Venezuela
- S. pholcoides Simon, 1898 – Seychelles
- S. pintodarochai Rheims & Brescovit, 2009 – Brazil
- S. piroca Rheims & Brescovit, 2000 – Brazil
- S. piyampisi Rheims, Barreiros, Brescovit & Bonaldo, 2005 – Brazil
- S. propinqua Stoliczka, 1869 – Pakistan, India
- S. pulchella Berland, 1914 – East Africa
- S. punctipes Simon, 1907 – São Tomé and Príncipe
- S. quarta Lawrence, 1927 – Namibia
- S. quattuordecemmaculata Strand, 1907 – China
- S. quinqua Lawrence, 1927 – Namibia, South Africa
- S. redempta Chamberlin, 1924 – Mexico
- S. reticulata Jézéquel, 1964 – Ivory Coast
- S. robertoi Alayón, 1977 – Cuba
- S. romitii Caporiacco, 1947 – Guyana, Brazil
- S. rubra Lawrence, 1937 – South Africa
- S. ruizensis Strand, 1914 – Colombia
- S. rupestris González-Sponga, 2004 – Venezuela
- S. saaristoi Rheims & Brescovit, 2009 – Brazil
- S. saci Rheims & Brescovit, 2004 – Brazil
- S. sansibarica Strand, 1907 – Tanzania (Zanzibar)
- S. schultzei Purcell, 1908 – South Africa
- S. semipullata (Simon, 1909) – Tibet
- S. seppoi Bosmans & Van Keer, 2014 – Algeria, Tunisia
- S. sexstriata Roewer, 1960 – Afghanistan
- S. silvatica Purcell, 1904 – South Africa
- S. sincora Rheims & Brescovit, 2009 – Brazil
- S. skuki Rheims & Brescovit, 2001 – Brazil
- S. socialis Miller, 2006 – Madagascar
- S. sordida Dyal, 1935 – Pakistan
- S. stoliczkai Simon, 1897 – India
- S. strussmannae Rheims & Brescovit, 2001 – Brazil
- S. subadulta Strand, 1911 – Indonesia (Aru Is.)
- S. subulata Purcell, 1904 – South Africa
- S. symmetrica Lawrence, 1938 – South Africa
- S. tabuleiro Rheims & Brescovit, 2009 – Brazil
- S. tacapepucu Rheims & Brescovit, 2006 – Brazil
- S. tapacura Rheims & Brescovit, 2009 – Brazil
- S. tapuia Rheims & Brescovit, 2009 – Brazil
- S. tardigrada Thorell, 1881 – Myanmar, New Guinea, Australia (Queensland)
- S. tayos Dupérré & Tapia, 2023 – Ecuador
- S. tegucigalpa Brescovit & Rheims, 2001 – Honduras
- S. tenerifensis Wunderlich, 1987 – Canary Islands
- S. tertia Lawrence, 1927 – Angola, Namibia
- S. testudo Purcell, 1904 – South Africa
- S. tezcatlipoca Rheims, Brescovit & Durán-Barrón, 2007 – Mexico
- S. thoracica (Latreille, 1802) – Europe, North Africa, Turkey, Iran, temperate Asia, China, Korea, Japan. Introduced to North America, Argentina, South Africa, India, Australia, New Zealand (type species)
- S. tikaderi Biswas, 2023 – Bangladesh
- S. tinkuan Rheims & Brescovit, 2004 – Brazil
- S. tlaloc Rheims, Brescovit & Durán-Barrón, 2007 – Mexico
- S. triangulifera Purcell, 1904 – South Africa
- S. trifoliata Lawrence, 1938 – South Africa
- S. tropofila González-Sponga, 2004 – Venezuela
- S. turvo Rheims & Brescovit, 2009 – Brazil
- S. tuyucua Brescovit, Rheims & Raizer, 2004 – Brazil
- S. tyaia Rheims & Brescovit, 2009 – Brazil
- S. tyaiamiri Rheims & Brescovit, 2006 – Brazil
- S. tyaiapyssanga Rheims & Brescovit, 2006 – Brazil
- S. tzitzimime Rheims, Brescovit & Durán-Barrón, 2007 – Mexico
- S. uligocetes Valerio, 1981 – Costa Rica
- S. una Rheims & Brescovit, 2009 – Brazil
- S. univittata Simon, 1882 – Turkmenistan, Kyrgyzstan, India. Introduced to Hawaii, Mexico, Cuba, Venezuela, Brazil, Paraguay, Chile, Ascension Island, Cape Verde, Canary Islands, Morocco, Spain, Italy, Cyprus, Egypt, Iraq, Iran
  - S. u. unilineata Thorell, 1887 – Myanmar
- S. upia Rheims & Brescovit, 2006 – Brazil
- S. vassununga Rheims & Brescovit, 2009 – Brazil
- S. vaurieorum Brescovit & Rheims, 2001 – Mexico, Guatemala
- S. velutina Heineken & Lowe, 1832 – Mediterranean, Cape Verde, Ascension, Seychelles
- S. venusta (Thorell, 1890) – Sri Lanka, Indonesia (Java)
- S. vieirae Rheims & Brescovit, 2000 – Brazil
- S. xai Rheims & Brescovit, 2006 – Brazil
- S. ybyrapesse Rheims & Brescovit, 2006 – Brazil
- S. yphanta Wang, 1994 – China
- S. yssaiapari Rheims & Brescovit, 2006 – Brazil
- S. ytu Rheims & Brescovit, 2009 – Brazil
- S. zamena Wang, 1994 – China
- S. zamorano Brescovit & Rheims, 2001 – Honduras
- S. zapatana Gertsch & Mulaik, 1940 – United States
- S. tanjiashui Shi, P. Liu, Yao et K. Liu, 2026
- S. bergeri Strand, 1915
- S. bilqis Rheims, Brescovit & van Harten, 2006
- S. lara Rheims & Brescovit, 2004
- S. lugubris (Thorell, 1887)
- S. magna Bristowe, 1952
- S. makeda Rheims, Brescovit & van Harten, 2006
- S. strandi Spassky, 1941
- S. subthoracica Strand, 1906
- S. suffusa Strand, 1906
- S. vittata Keyserling, 1877
