= Scytodes lycosella =

Scientific classification
- Kingdom: Animalia
- Phylum: Arthropoda
- Subphylum: Chelicerata
- Class: Arachnida
- Order: Araneae
- Infraorder: Araneomorphae
- Family: Scytodidae
- Genus: Scytodes
- Species: S. lycosella

Binomial name
- Scytodes lycosella Purcell, 1904

Species of spider

Scytodes lycosella is a species of spider in the family Scytodidae. It is endemic to South Africa.

== Distribution ==
Scytodes lycosella is found only in KwaZulu-Natal Province, where it is known from Rietvlei in the Umvoti district.

== Habitat and ecology ==
The species inhabits the Savanna biome at an altitude of 1450 m above sea level. It is a wandering spider collected from under stones and dark places on the soil surface.

Adult females were last sampled in 1899, and no males have been collected.

== Description ==
Scytodes lycosella females have a distinctive carapace pattern with only three black stripes above. The median stripe is abbreviated behind, reaching only to the middle of the carapace. The outer stripes are very broad, nearly meeting posteriorly, each containing an oval yellow spot just before the middle of the carapace. The median yellow area just behind the median black stripe is broad and spindle-shaped. The sides of the carapace show black reticulation and several tiers of yellow areas.

The legs are very strongly banded, with the femora displaying three strong black bands. The anterior pair of legs are also spotted with black near the apex.

== Conservation ==
Scytodes lycosella is listed as Data Deficient by the IUCN due to taxonomic reasons. The species has not been collected since 1899, and its current status remains unknown. The threats to the species are unknown, and more sampling is needed to collect males and determine the species' range.

== Taxonomy ==
The species has not been revised and is known only from the female. The epigyne has been illustrated.
