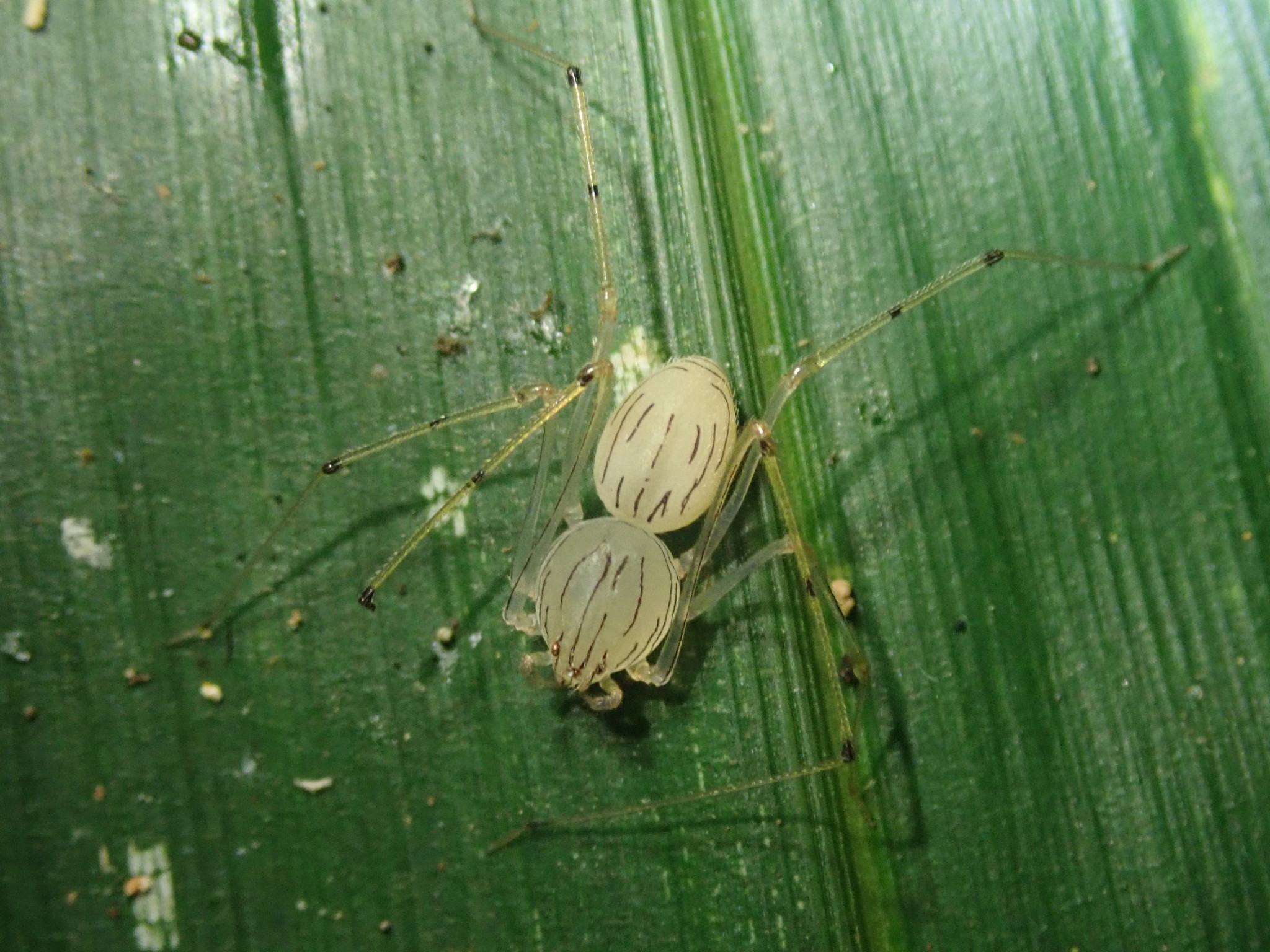
- S. pallida from Cambodia

Scientific classification
- Kingdom: Animalia
- Phylum: Arthropoda
- Subphylum: Chelicerata
- Class: Arachnida
- Order: Araneae
- Infraorder: Araneomorphae
- Family: Scytodidae
- Genus: Scytodes
- Species: S. pallida

Binomial name
- Scytodes pallida Doleschall, 1859

= Scytodes pallida =

Species of spider

Scytodes pallida is a species of spitting spider in the family Scytodidae. It was first described by Doleschall in 1859 and has a wide distribution across tropical Asia and the Indo-Pacific region.

== Distribution ==
S. pallida has been recorded from India, China, the Philippines, and Indonesia (including the Moluccas and New Guinea). The species appears to have a broad distribution across tropical regions of Asia and the western Pacific.

== Description ==
Based on Doleschall's original 1859 description, S. pallida is a pale yellowish spider with a highly arched thorax and abdomen marked with very fine black stripes. The ventral surface and legs are yellowish, with the legs having fine black rings. The species measures approximately 2 inches in length.

The thorax is particularly high in its posterior half, and all six eyes are of equal size. On the middle of the back are two parallel black very fine stripes, with additional oblique stripes running from outside to inside. The abdomen is round, with 5 to 6 black longitudinal and some transverse stripes on the front half. The legs are very thin and much longer than the body, with a leg formula of 1.4.2.3, appearing pale yellowish with barely visible zigzag black rings.

== Habitat ==
The species was originally found in Amboina (Ambon Island) on flowering low shrubs. It is described as being very slow in its movements, with round egg sacs containing approximately 30 eggs from which young spiders emerge after 8 days and remain gathered around the mother's spinnerets for several days.
