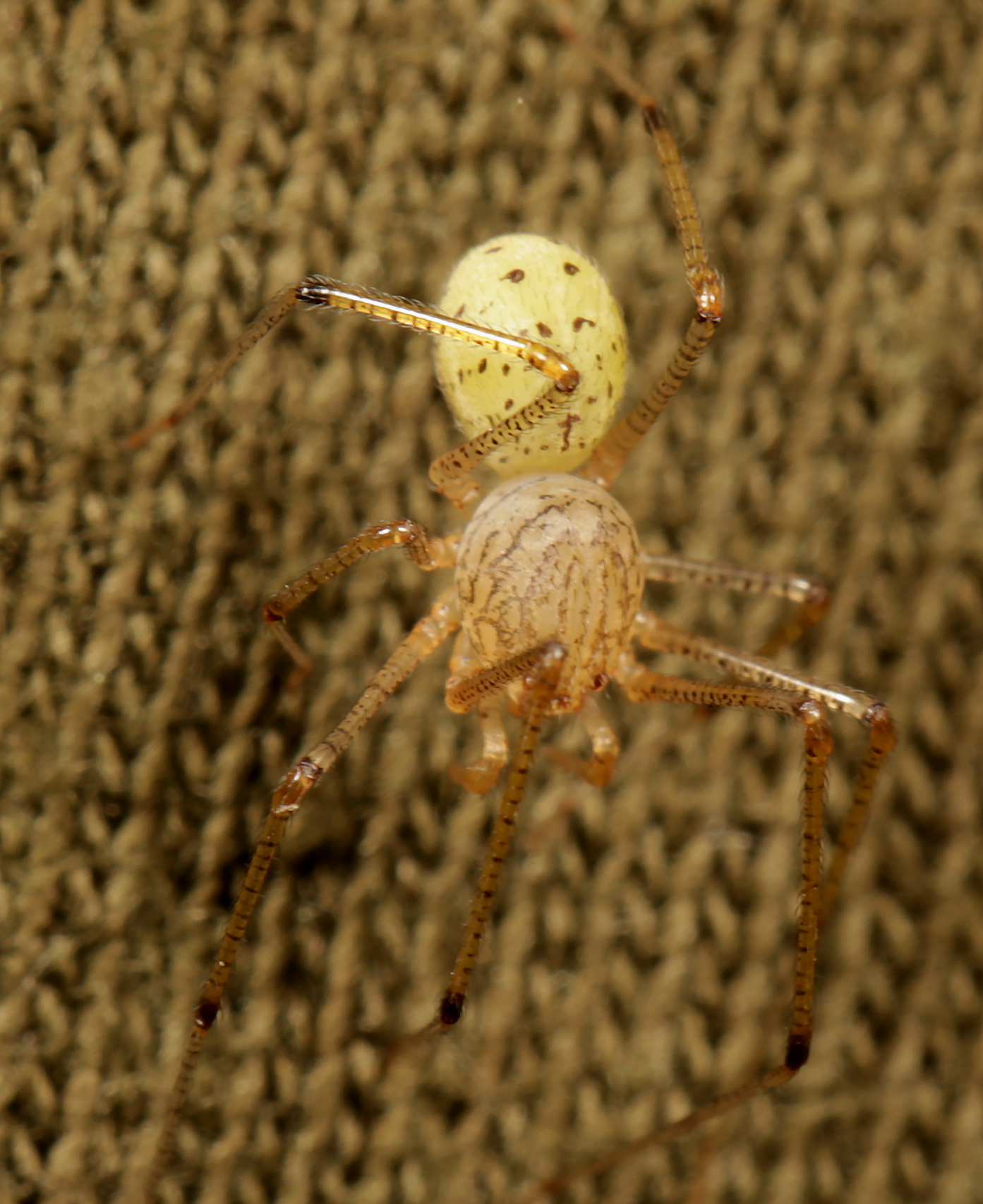

Scientific classification
- Kingdom: Animalia
- Phylum: Arthropoda
- Subphylum: Chelicerata
- Class: Arachnida
- Order: Araneae
- Infraorder: Araneomorphae
- Family: Scytodidae
- Genus: Scytodes
- Species: S. maritima

Binomial name
- Scytodes maritima Lawrence, 1938

= Scytodes maritima =

Maritima Spitting Spider

Species of spider

Scytodes maritima is a species of spider in the family Scytodidae. It is endemic to South Africa and is commonly known as the Maritima spitting spider.

== Distribution ==
Scytodes maritima is widely distributed across three South African provinces, KwaZulu-Natal, Limpopo, and Mpumalanga. It has been recorded from more than ten protected areas across its range.

== Habitat and ecology ==
The species inhabits multiple biomes including Forest, Grassland, Indian Ocean Coastal Belt, and Savanna biomes, as well as commercial pine plantations, at altitudes ranging from 27 to 2142 m above sea level. It is a wandering spider commonly collected from tree and herb layers and from under stones and dark places on the soil surface. At Ndumo Game Reserve, the species was also sampled from Vachellia xanthophloea bark.

== Conservation ==
Scytodes maritima is listed as Least Concern by the South African National Biodiversity Institute. Although the species is known only from females, it has a wide geographical range. The species is protected in several protected areas including Ndumo Game Reserve, Ophathe Game Reserve, Legalameetse Nature Reserve, and Blouberg Nature Reserve.

== Taxonomy ==
The species has not been revised and is known only from females. It has been illustrated.
