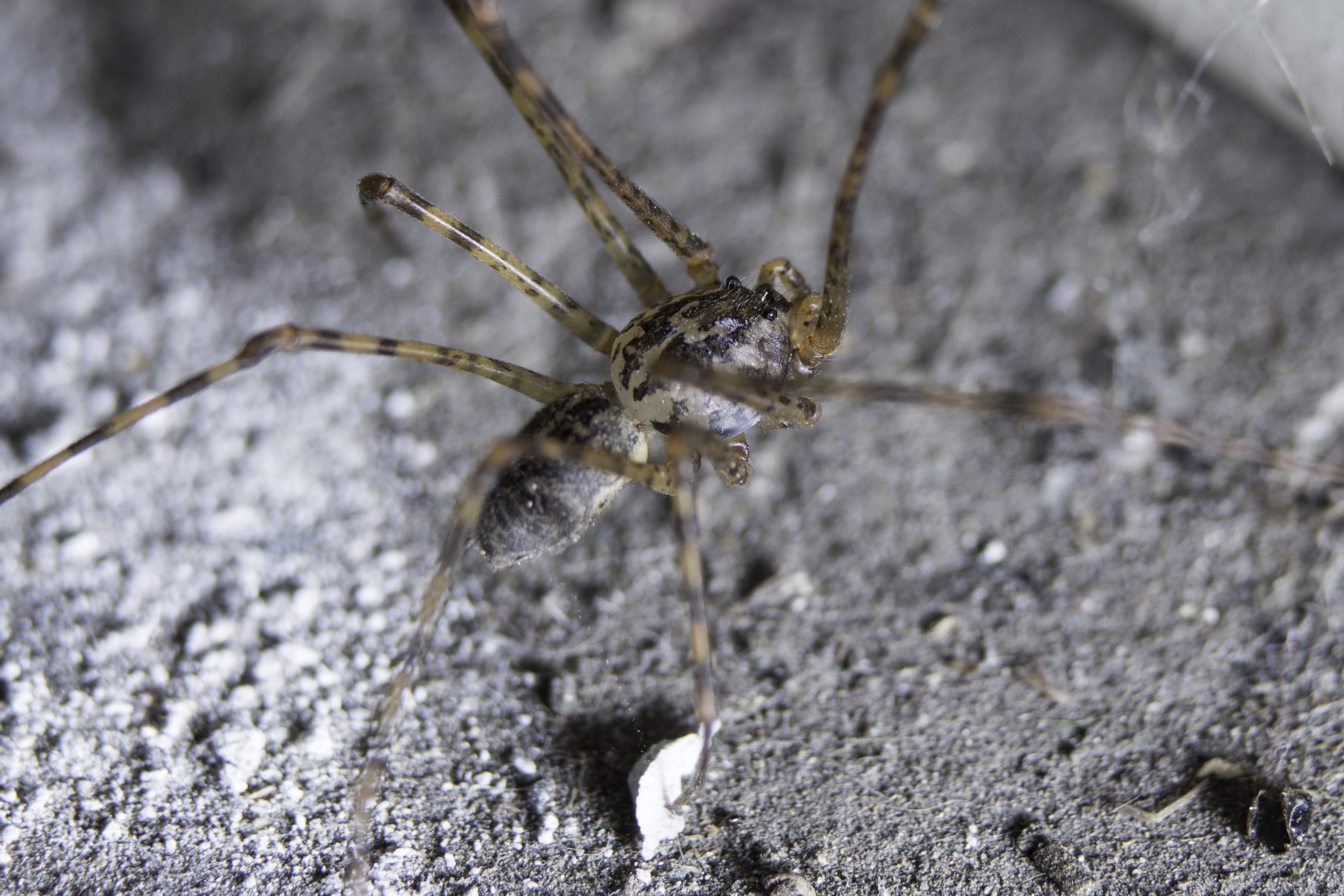

Scientific classification
- Kingdom: Animalia
- Phylum: Arthropoda
- Subphylum: Chelicerata
- Class: Arachnida
- Order: Araneae
- Infraorder: Araneomorphae
- Family: Scytodidae
- Genus: Scytodes
- Species: S. globula

Binomial name
- Scytodes globula (Nicolet, 1849)

Synonyms
- Scytodes maculata Scytodes annulata Scytodes scholaris Scytodes aguapeyanus

= Scytodes globula =

Chilean tiger spider

Species of spider

Scytodes globula, the Chilean tiger spider, is a predatory spider of the family Scytodidae. In Spanish, it is known as araña tigre, or "tiger spider", but is also well known as "long-legged spider" (because of the disproportional size of those members) or "spitting spider" (because of its hunting methods, in which it projects an extremely sticky web which immobilizes its prey). It has achieved fame by being the only natural predator of the extremely common and dangerous Chilean recluse spider (Loxosceles laeta).

== Description and habitat ==
The adult Chilean tiger spider's size varies from 30 up to 70 mm. Its body is small (specially if compared to the size of its legs, which are usually between three and four times the size of its body). It has slow movements and it hunts only at night.

The spider is native to South America (it is common in Chile, but can be found in other parts of South America, specifically in Argentina, Uruguay and Bolivia). It lives mostly inside houses in dark and hidden places such as behind frames or in closets, but it can also be frequently found outdoors under Eucalyptus trees.

== Hunting method ==
The hunting method of the Chilean tiger spider is quite characteristic and it is the origin of one of its nicknames, the spitting spider. At night, the spider stealthily approaches its prey and then contracts its abdomen projecting an extremely sticky and resistant spider-web, which imprisons its prey even if it is larger than the spider; then, once the prey is verified to be immobilized, the spider injects its poison, secreted from its second venom gland.

== Prey ==
The Chilean tiger spider preys on flies, mosquitoes, bees, horse-flies, and other insects. However it also eats other kinds of spiders, and it has become famous for being the only natural predator of the common and dangerous recluse spider (Loxosceles laeta).

== Webs ==
The Chilean tiger spider builds barely elaborated spider-webs and only in its refuges.

== Bites ==
It is extremely unlikely for the Chilean tiger spider to attack beings that are more than twice its size (mainly because of its hunting methods), so an attack on a human being has almost no chance of happening. It has been declared by several studies of Chilean Universities to be "innocuous to human beings". There are no clinical records of attacks on humans.

== Relationship with the Chilean recluse spider ==
Due to having a similar thermal and environmental preference, it is common for the tiger spider to live near the chilean recluse spider which indicates a high probability of encounters and predation from part of the tiger spider, for which it's famous. A study of the behaviour and interaction of the two spiders from the University of Chile consisted of 25 experiments, where only 15 of the meetings ended up in an encounter between the two, with the tiger spider killing the chilean recluse spider in 12 of them. Regardless of the results of this small experiment, the status of the tiger spider as a predator of the chilean recluse spider remains up for debate, and more studies have to be done to conclusively determine this.

== Sources ==
- Coelho, Lorena; Escalante, Ignacio; Aisenberg, Anita (2015). "Mordidas cariñosas: descripción de cortejo y cópula en la araña escupidora Scytodes globula (Scytodidae)" [Affectionate bites: courtship and copulation description in the spitting spider Scytodes globula (Scytodidae)] (PDF). Boletín de la Sociedad zoológica del Uruguay (in Spanish). 24 (2): 146–157.
- Alfaro, C.; Veloso, C.; Torres-ContreraS, H.; Solis, R.; Canals, M. (December 2013). "Thermal niche overlap of the corner recluse spider Loxosceles laeta (Araneae; Sicariidae) and its possible predator, the spitting spider Scytodes globula (Scytodidae)". Journal of Thermal Biology. 38 (8): 502–507. Bibcode:2013JTBio..38..502A. doi:10.1016/j.jtherbio.2013.08.003. hdl:10533/130560.
- https://web.archive.org/web/20130318031224/http://www2.udec.cl/~aracnologia/comun/tigre.html
- Aliaga, Arriagada; Alejandro, Nicolás (2014). Etograma de depredación de Scytodes globula (araña tigre) sobre la araña de rincón Loxosceles laeta [Etogram of predation of Scytodes globula (tiger spider) on the corner spider Loxosceles laeta] (Thesis) (in Spanish). hdl:2250/131923.
