= Scytodes marshalli =

Scientific classification
- Kingdom: Animalia
- Phylum: Arthropoda
- Subphylum: Chelicerata
- Class: Arachnida
- Order: Araneae
- Infraorder: Araneomorphae
- Family: Scytodidae
- Genus: Scytodes
- Species: S. marshalli

Binomial name
- Scytodes marshalli Pocock, 1902

Species of spider

Scytodes marshalli is a species of spider in the family Scytodidae. It is endemic to South Africa.

== Distribution ==
Scytodes marshalli is found only in KwaZulu-Natal Province, where it is known from Estcourt.

== Habitat and ecology ==
The species inhabits the Grassland biome at an altitude of 1152 m above sea level. It is a wandering spider collected from under stones and dark places on the soil surface.

== Conservation ==
Scytodes marshalli is listed as Data Deficient by the IUCN for taxonomic reasons. The species is known only from the type locality and has not been revised. More sampling is needed to collect males and determine the species' range.

== Taxonomy ==
The species has not been revised and is known only from the female. The epigyne has been illustrated.
