= Scytodes flagellata =

Long Palp Spitting Spider

Conservation status
- Least Concern (SANBI Red List)

Scientific classification
- Kingdom: Animalia
- Phylum: Arthropoda
- Subphylum: Chelicerata
- Class: Arachnida
- Order: Araneae
- Infraorder: Araneomorphae
- Family: Scytodidae
- Genus: Scytodes
- Species: S. flagellata

Binomial name
- Scytodes flagellata Purcell, 1904

Species of spider

Scytodes flagellata is a species of spider in the family Scytodidae. It is commonly known as the long palp spitting spider and is endemic to South Africa.

== Distribution ==
Scytodes flagellata is recorded from four provinces in South Africa, Gauteng, KwaZulu-Natal, Mpumalanga, and the Western Cape. Notable locations include Pretoria National Botanical Garden, Bontebok National Park, and Kogelberg. The species is found at elevations ranging from 63 to 1,698 m above sea level.

== Habitat and ecology ==
Scytodes flagellata are wandering spiders commonly collected from vegetation in the tree and herb layer and from under stones and in dark places on the soil surface. The species has been sampled from the Fynbos, Grassland, and Savanna biomes.

== Description ==
The carapace has a mesial yellow stripe that is dilated, with outer black stripes that are very broad with jagged outer and concave inner margins containing several small yellow dots. Laterally there is black reticulation, and the sternum has spots. The abdomen has transverse black bands and is speckled all over. Legs are spotted and femora are furnished with a distal band, with the patella dark.

== Conservation ==
Scytodes flagellata is listed as Least Concern by the South African National Biodiversity Institute due to its wide geographical range. There are no significant threats to the species.

== Taxonomy ==
The species has not been revised and is known from both sexes, which have been illustrated.
