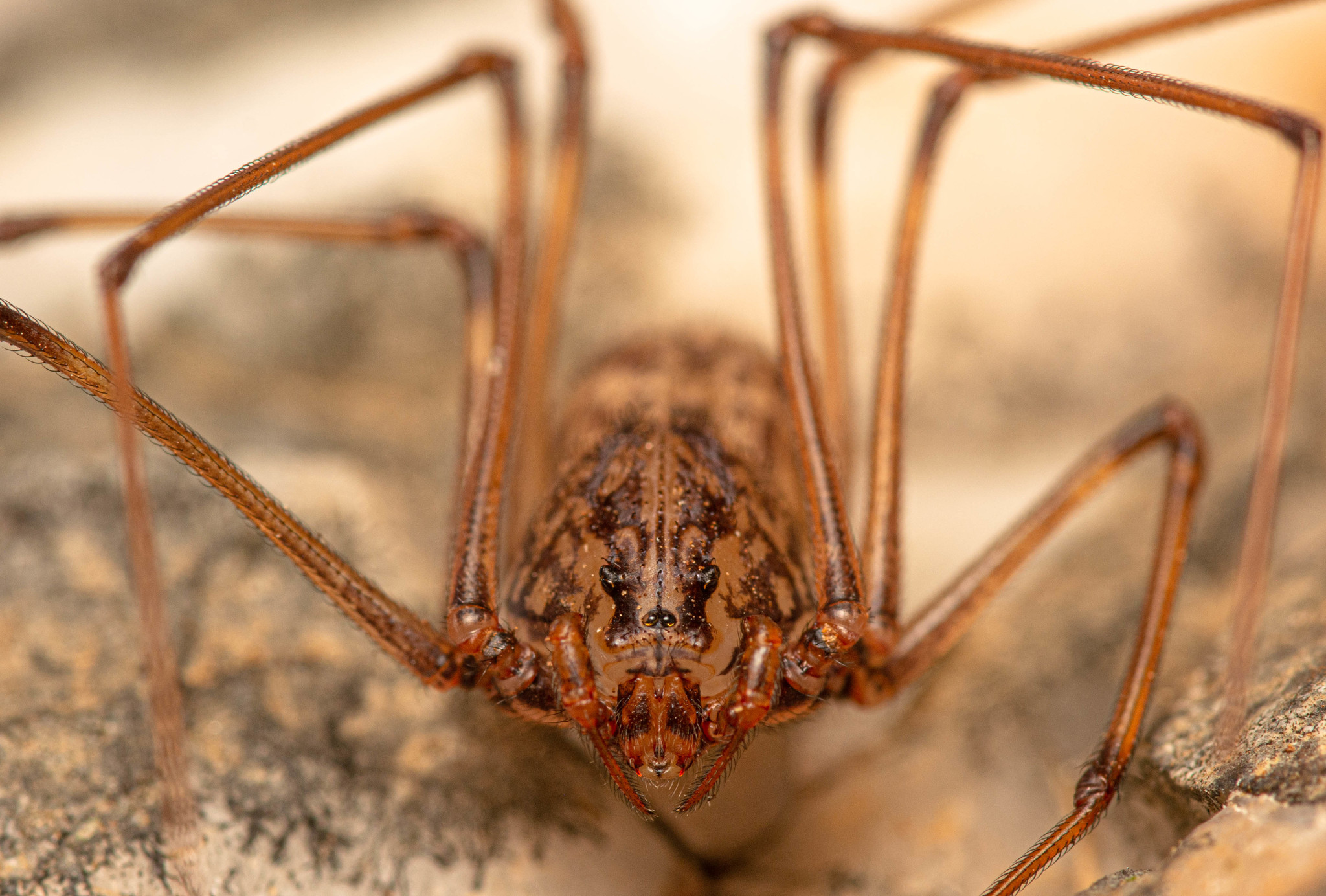
- male

Scientific classification
- Kingdom: Animalia
- Phylum: Arthropoda
- Subphylum: Chelicerata
- Class: Arachnida
- Order: Araneae
- Infraorder: Araneomorphae
- Family: Scytodidae
- Genus: Scytodes
- Species: S. arenacea

Binomial name
- Scytodes arenacea Purcell, 1904

= Scytodes arenacea =

Arid Spitting Spider

Species of spider

Scytodes arenacea is a species of spider in the family Scytodidae. It is commonly known as the arid spitting spider and is found in Namibia and South Africa.

== Distribution ==
Scytodes arenacea occurs in Namibia and South Africa. In South Africa, it is known only from the Northern Cape, where it has been recorded from localities including Kenhardt, Orange River, Tswalu Game Reserve, Augrabies National Park, Beenbreek, Swartduinkop, Gams, and Benfontein Nature Reserve. The species has a large extent of occurrence and is found at elevations ranging from 635 to 1172 m above sea level.

== Habitat and ecology ==
Scytodes arenacea are wandering ground dwellers commonly collected from under stones and in dark places on the soil surface. This species is common in the arid regions of the Northern Cape and has been sampled from the Desert, Succulent and Nama Karoo, and Savanna biomes.

== Description ==
The carapace has three stripes that pass the eyes to the front, with yellow femora having only a few dots forming a feeble distal band. The abdomen has small black spots, and in the female there are horny plates on the ventral surface of the abdomen that are shaped ) ( and are wide apart.

== Conservation ==
Scytodes arenacea is listed as Least Concern by the South African National Biodiversity Institute due to its wide geographical range. There are no significant threats to the species. It is protected in several protected areas including Tswalu Game Reserve, Augrabies National Park, and Benfontein Nature Reserve.

== Taxonomy ==
The species has not been revised and is known only from the female. The male was described by Purcell in 1908.
