= Scytodes lugubris =

Scientific classification
- Kingdom: Animalia
- Phylum: Arthropoda
- Subphylum: Chelicerata
- Class: Arachnida
- Order: Araneae
- Infraorder: Araneomorphae
- Family: Scytodidae
- Genus: Scytodes
- Species: S. lugubris

Binomial name
- Scytodes lugubris (Thorell, 1887)

Species of spider

Scytodes lugubris is a species of spitting spider in the family Scytodidae. It is found in Tropical Asia, has been introduced into Hawaii, and Mexico.
