= Scytodes symmetrica =

Scientific classification
- Kingdom: Animalia
- Phylum: Arthropoda
- Subphylum: Chelicerata
- Class: Arachnida
- Order: Araneae
- Infraorder: Araneomorphae
- Family: Scytodidae
- Genus: Scytodes
- Species: S. symmetrica

Binomial name
- Scytodes symmetrica Lawrence, 1938

Species of spider

Scytodes symmetrica is a species of spider in the family Scytodidae. It is endemic to South Africa.

== Distribution ==
Scytodes symmetrica is found only in KwaZulu-Natal Province, where it is known from Bulwer.

== Habitat and ecology ==
The species inhabits the Grassland biome at an altitude of 1534 m above sea level. It is a wandering spider collected from under stones and dark places on the soil surface.

== Conservation ==
Scytodes symmetrica is listed as Data Deficient by the IUCN for taxonomic reasons. The species is known only from the type locality and more sampling is needed to collect males and determine the species' range.

== Taxonomy ==
The species has not been revised and is known only from the female. It has been illustrated.
