= Scytodes karrooica =

Scientific classification
- Kingdom: Animalia
- Phylum: Arthropoda
- Subphylum: Chelicerata
- Class: Arachnida
- Order: Araneae
- Infraorder: Araneomorphae
- Family: Scytodidae
- Genus: Scytodes
- Species: S. karrooica

Binomial name
- Scytodes karrooica Purcell, 1904

Species of spider

Scytodes karrooica is a species of spider in the family Scytodidae. It is endemic to the Western Cape of South Africa.

== Distribution ==
Scytodes karrooica is endemic to the Western Cape province of South Africa. The species is known only from the type locality of Matjiesfontein, at 912 m above sea level.

== Habitat and ecology ==
Scytodes karrooica are wandering spiders commonly collected from under stones and in dark places on the soil surface of the Nama Karoo biome.

== Description ==
The carapace has five black stripes, with the median stripe short. The abdomen is pale with black transverse bands and spots. Femora of legs are striped longitudinally.

== Conservation ==
Scytodes karrooica is listed as Data Deficient for taxonomic reasons. The status of the species remains obscure as it was last sampled in 1903. Threats are unknown, but more sampling is needed to collect the male and to determine the species' range.

== Taxonomy ==
The species has not been revised and is known only from a female, with the epigyne illustrated. More sampling is needed to collect the male and to determine the species' range.
