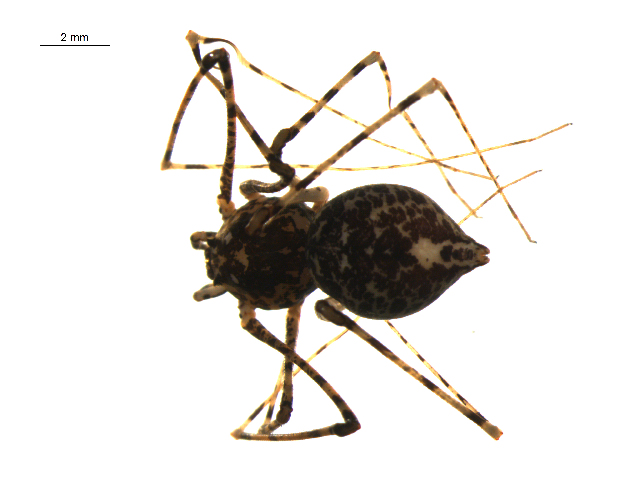
- S. longipes, adult female
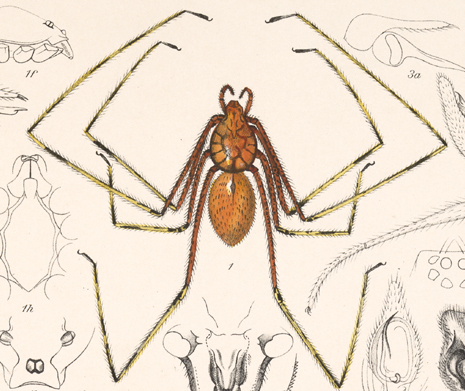
- drawing of S. longipes

Scientific classification
- Kingdom: Animalia
- Phylum: Arthropoda
- Subphylum: Chelicerata
- Class: Arachnida
- Order: Araneae
- Infraorder: Araneomorphae
- Family: Scytodidae
- Genus: Scytodes
- Species: S. longipes

Binomial name
- Scytodes longipes Lucas, 1844

= Scytodes longipes =

Species of spider

Scytodes longipes is a species of spitting spider in the family Scytodidae. It is found in Southern America, has been introduced into Pacific Islands, Guinea, Congo, Indonesia (Irian Jaya), and Australia (Queensland).

== Subspecies ==
These two subspecies belong to the species Scytodes longipes:

- (Scytodes longipes longipes) Lucas, 1844
- Scytodes longipes simplex Franganillo, 1926
