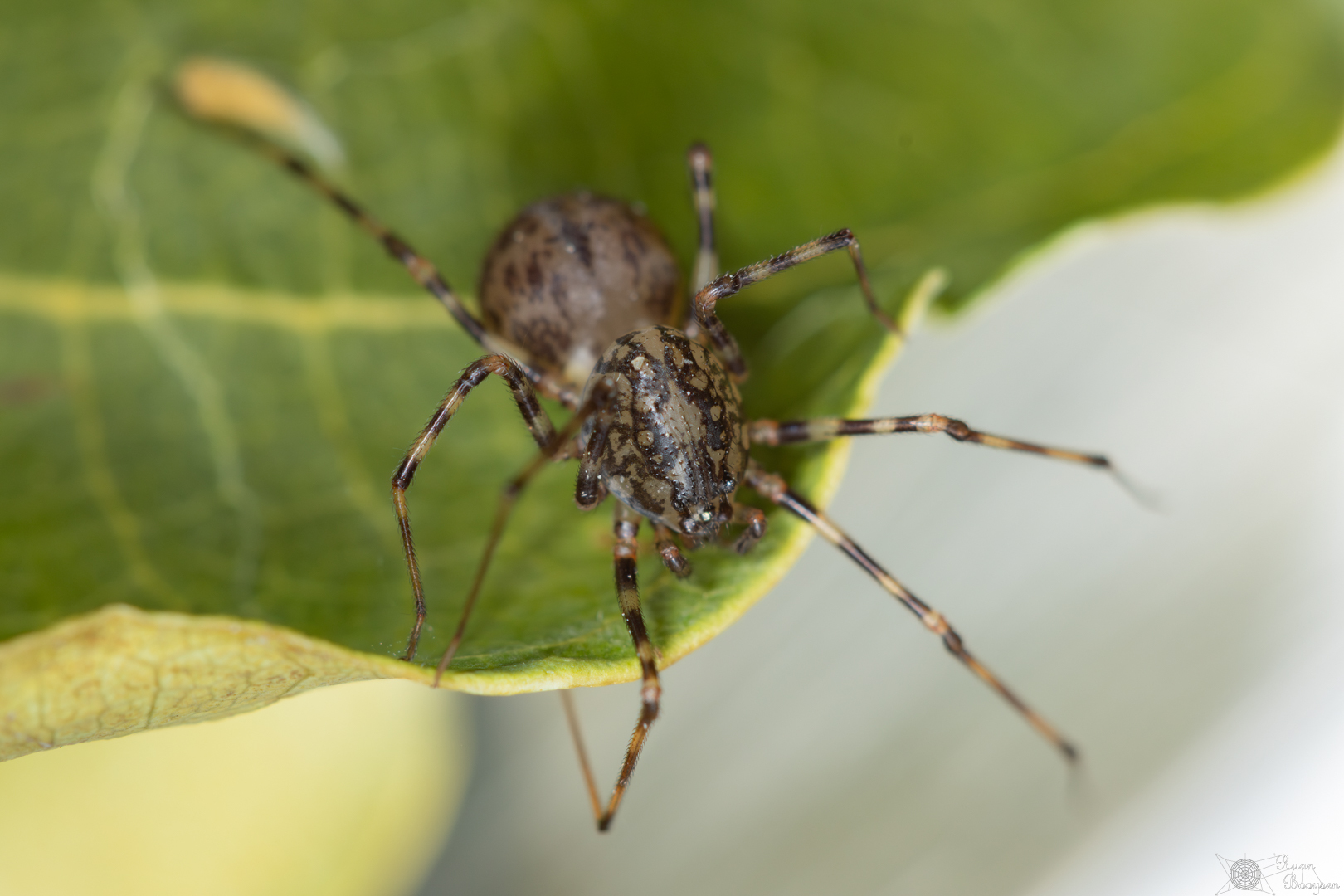
- female
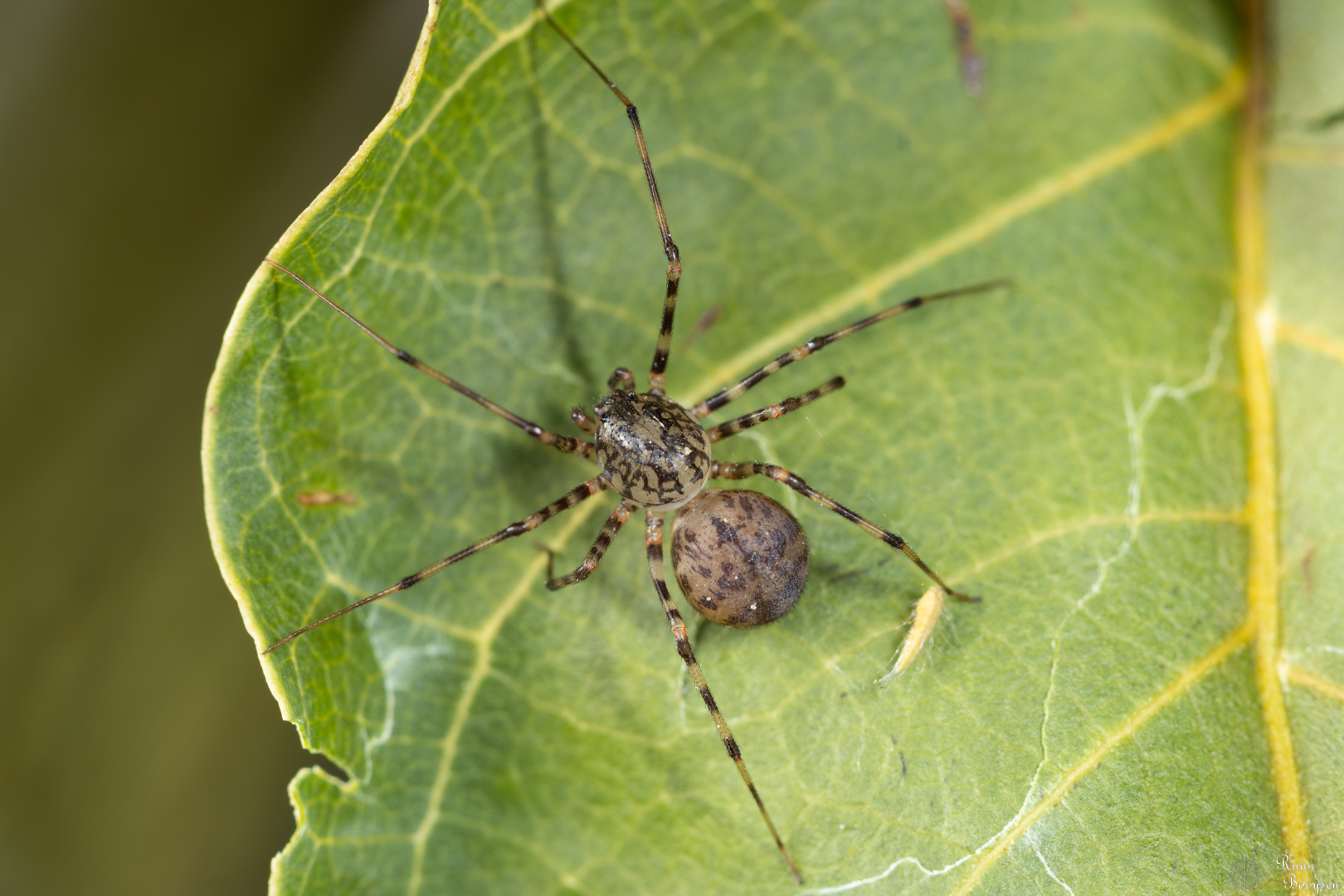
- female

Scientific classification
- Kingdom: Animalia
- Phylum: Arthropoda
- Subphylum: Chelicerata
- Class: Arachnida
- Order: Araneae
- Infraorder: Araneomorphae
- Family: Scytodidae
- Genus: Scytodes
- Species: S. drakensbergensis

Binomial name
- Scytodes drakensbergensis Lawrence, 1947

= Scytodes drakensbergensis =

Drakensberg Spitting Spider

Species of spider

Scytodes drakensbergensis is a species of spider in the family Scytodidae. It is commonly known as the Drakensberg spitting spider and is endemic to South Africa.

== Distribution ==
Scytodes drakensbergensis is recorded from two provinces in South Africa, the Free State and KwaZulu-Natal. Notable locations include Van Reenen, Mpetsane Conservation Estate, Cathedral Peak, Royal Natal National Park, Vryheid Nature Reserve, and Ithala Nature Reserve. The species is found at elevations ranging from 76 to 1,703 m above sea level.

== Habitat and ecology ==
Scytodes drakensbergensis are wandering spiders commonly collected from vegetation or from under stones and in dark places on the soil surface. The species has been sampled from the Grassland biome.

== Description ==
The abdomen above and below is speckled with larger and smaller dot-like markings arranged symmetrically. Legs have femora each with sub-basal, median, and subapical bands, with the middle one being the widest. Patellae are blackish-brown in their apical halves. Tibiae have narrow basal and apical blackish bands. Metatarsi have an apical band and a second one near the base, both these bands less distinct than those of the other segments, especially in leg I.

== Conservation ==
Scytodes drakensbergensis is listed as Least Concern by the South African National Biodiversity Institute. Although the species is presently known only from one sex, it has a wide geographical range. There are no significant threats to the species. It is protected in several protected areas including Mpetsane Conservation Estate, Vryheid Nature Reserve, Royal Natal National Park, and Hluhluwe Game Reserve.

== Taxonomy ==
The species has not been revised and is known only from the female, which has been illustrated.
