= Scytodes constellata =

Nkandla Spitting Spider

Conservation status
- Least Concern (SANBI Red List)

Scientific classification
- Kingdom: Animalia
- Phylum: Arthropoda
- Subphylum: Chelicerata
- Class: Arachnida
- Order: Araneae
- Infraorder: Araneomorphae
- Family: Scytodidae
- Genus: Scytodes
- Species: S. constellata

Binomial name
- Scytodes constellata Lawrence, 1938

Species of spider

Scytodes constellata is a species of spider in the family Scytodidae. It is commonly known as the Nkandla spitting spider and is endemic to South Africa.

== Distribution ==
Scytodes constellata is recorded from four provinces in South Africa: the Eastern Cape, KwaZulu-Natal, Limpopo, and Mpumalanga. Notable locations include Cwebe Nature Reserve, Mkambati Nature Reserve, Nkandla Forest, Kruger National Park, and Legalameetse Nature Reserve. The species is found at elevations ranging from 19 to 1,512 m above sea level.

== Habitat and ecology ==
Scytodes constellata are wandering spiders commonly collected from under stones and in dark places on the soil surface. The species has been sampled from the Forest, Indian Ocean Coastal Belt, Savanna, and Thicket biomes.

== Description ==
The anterior surfaces of chelicerae have a blackish stripe along their inner margins. The abdomen above has a blackish median stripe in the anterior half, the posterior half with wavy cross-bars, and a horseshoe-shaped marking above the spinnerets.

== Conservation ==
Scytodes constellata is listed as Least Concern by the South African National Biodiversity Institute due to its wide geographical range. There are no significant threats to the species. It is protected in several protected areas including Mkambati Nature Reserve, Kruger National Park, and Legalameetse Nature Reserve.

== Taxonomy ==
The species has not been revised and is described only from a juvenile. Although the type specimen was based on a juvenile, the patterns on the body are distinct. Adults still need to be described.
