= Scytodes lyriformis =

Scientific classification
- Kingdom: Animalia
- Phylum: Arthropoda
- Subphylum: Chelicerata
- Class: Arachnida
- Order: Araneae
- Infraorder: Araneomorphae
- Family: Scytodidae
- Genus: Scytodes
- Species: S. lyriformis

Binomial name
- Scytodes lyriformis Purcell, 1904

Species of spider

Scytodes lyriformis is a species of spider in the family Scytodidae. It is endemic to South Africa.

== Distribution ==
Scytodes lyriformis is found only in the Northern Cape Province, where it is known from Hanover.

== Habitat and ecology ==
The species inhabits the Nama Karoo biome at an altitude of 1358 m above sea level. It is a wandering spider collected from under stones and dark places on the soil surface.

The species was last sampled in 1901, and its current status remains unknown.

== Description ==
Scytodes lyriformis has a distinctive carapace pattern with five black stripes above. The median stripe is short, continued only a little distance behind the median eyes. The inner paired stripes are narrow and subparallel, somewhat remote from the outer stripes and connected before their middle with the latter by a transverse bridge, and often again at the outcurve anterior ends. The posterior ends converge and are free. The outer stripes are not very broad. The sides of the carapace have a row of black-bordered yellow areas on each side with black marks above and below these.

The femora of the legs are striped longitudinally with rows of spots and black lines. This species scarcely differs from S. subulata and may be merely a colour variety.

== Conservation ==
Scytodes lyriformis is listed as Data Deficient due to the limited information available. The species is known only from the type locality and has not been collected since 1901. More sampling is needed to determine the species' range.

== Etymology ==
The specific name means "lyre-shaped" in Latin.

== Taxonomy ==
The species has not been revised and is known from both sexes, but has not been illustrated.
