= Scytodes schultzei =

Steinkopf Spitting Spider

Scientific classification
- Kingdom: Animalia
- Phylum: Arthropoda
- Subphylum: Chelicerata
- Class: Arachnida
- Order: Araneae
- Infraorder: Araneomorphae
- Family: Scytodidae
- Genus: Scytodes
- Species: S. schultzei

Binomial name
- Scytodes schultzei Purcell, 1908

Species of spider

Scytodes schultzei is a species of spider in the family Scytodidae. It is endemic to South Africa and is commonly known as the Steinkopf spitting spider.

== Distribution ==
Scytodes schultzei is found only in the Northern Cape Province, where it has been sampled from several localities including Steinkopf, Sendelingsdrif, and Richtersveld Transfrontier National Park.

== Habitat and ecology ==
The species inhabits the Desert and Succulent Karoo biomes at altitudes ranging from 63 to 870 m above sea level. It is a wandering spider commonly collected from under stones and dark places on the soil surface.

== Conservation ==
Scytodes schultzei is listed as Data Deficient by the IUCN for taxonomic purposes. More sampling is needed to collect males and determine the species' range. The species is protected in the Richtersveld Transfrontier National Park.

== Taxonomy ==
The species has not been revised and is known only from the female. The epigyne has been illustrated.
