= Scytodes lanceolata =

Scientific classification
- Kingdom: Animalia
- Phylum: Arthropoda
- Subphylum: Chelicerata
- Class: Arachnida
- Order: Araneae
- Infraorder: Araneomorphae
- Family: Scytodidae
- Genus: Scytodes
- Species: S. lanceolata

Binomial name
- Scytodes lanceolata Purcell, 1904

Species of spider

Scytodes lanceolata is a species of spider in the family Scytodidae. It is endemic to the Northern Cape of South Africa.

== Distribution ==
Scytodes lanceolata is endemic to the Northern Cape province of South Africa. The species is known only from the type locality of Hanover, at 1,358 m above sea level.

== Habitat and ecology ==
Scytodes lanceolata are wandering spiders commonly collected from under stones and in dark places on the soil surface of the Nama Karoo biome.

== Description ==
The carapace has three black stripes above, with the median yellow stripe rather broad and the median black stripe very fine posteriorly, not reaching behind the middle of the carapace. The outer black stripes are broad, each with a longitudinal series of three or four yellow spots or stripes. The sides of the carapace are reticulated with black, showing several tiers of yellow spaces.

The abdomen has transverse black bands and rows of spots. Femora of legs have a black bar at the apex, with the anterior surface, at least in the anterior pairs, also sprinkled with black. Tibiae are sparsely sprinkled with black, with the apex having a black band.

== Conservation ==
Scytodes lanceolata is listed as Data Deficient for taxonomic reasons. The status of the species remains obscure. Threats to the species are unknown. More sampling is needed to collect the female and to determine the species' range.

== Taxonomy ==
The species has not been revised and is known only from a male, with the embolus illustrated.
