= Scytodes broomi =

Scientific classification
- Kingdom: Animalia
- Phylum: Arthropoda
- Subphylum: Chelicerata
- Class: Arachnida
- Order: Araneae
- Infraorder: Araneomorphae
- Family: Scytodidae
- Genus: Scytodes
- Species: S. broomi

Binomial name
- Scytodes broomi Pocock, 1902

Species of spider

Scytodes broomi is a species of spider in the family Scytodidae. It is endemic to South Africa.

== Distribution ==
Scytodes broomi is known from several localities in the Northern Cape province of South Africa, including Garies, Kamaggas, and Benfontein Nature Reserve. The species is found at elevations ranging from 231 to 1,172 m above sea level.

== Habitat and ecology ==
Scytodes broomi are free-living ground spiders commonly collected from under stones and in dark places on the soil surface. The species has been sampled from the Grassland and Succulent Karoo biomes.

== Description ==
The carapace is ornamented with yellow and black bands of about equal width. An anterior black patch covers the median eyes, and a black stripe extends backwards on each side of the middle line, over the lateral eyes, stopping short just past the middle of the carapace in front of the highest point of the eminence.

Legs are yellow and black with black coxae in front, trochanters with an anterior black spot, and femora largely blackish in front. The abdomen is ornamented above with four rows of black spots and is blackish beneath.

== Conservation ==
Scytodes broomi is listed as Data Deficient for taxonomic reasons. The status of the species remains obscure, and more sampling is needed to collect the male and determine the species' range. Threats to the species are unknown. It is protected in Benfontein Nature Reserve.

== Taxonomy ==
The species has not been revised and is known only from the female, with the epigyne illustrated. More sampling is needed to collect the male and to determine the species' range.
