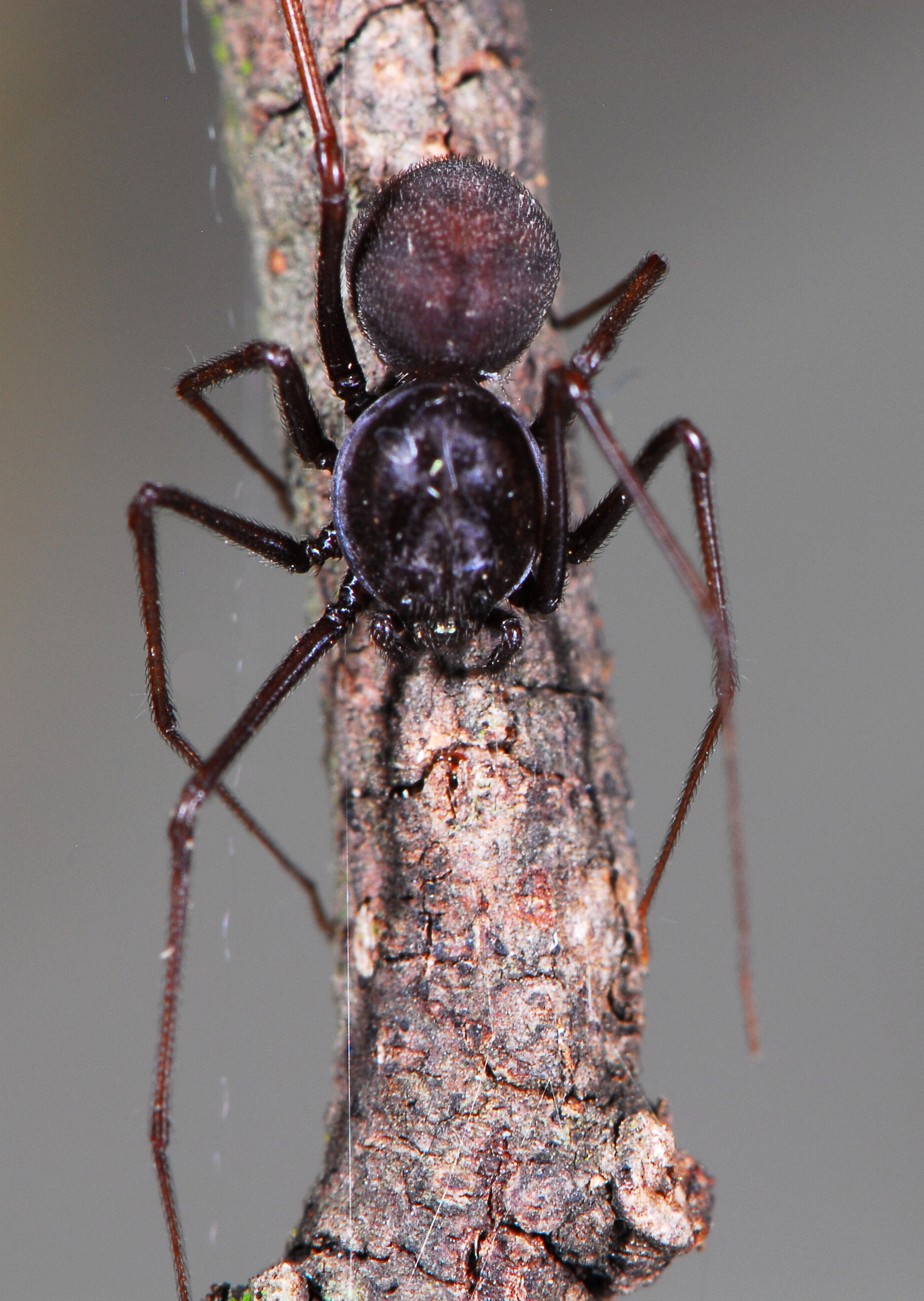
- Female
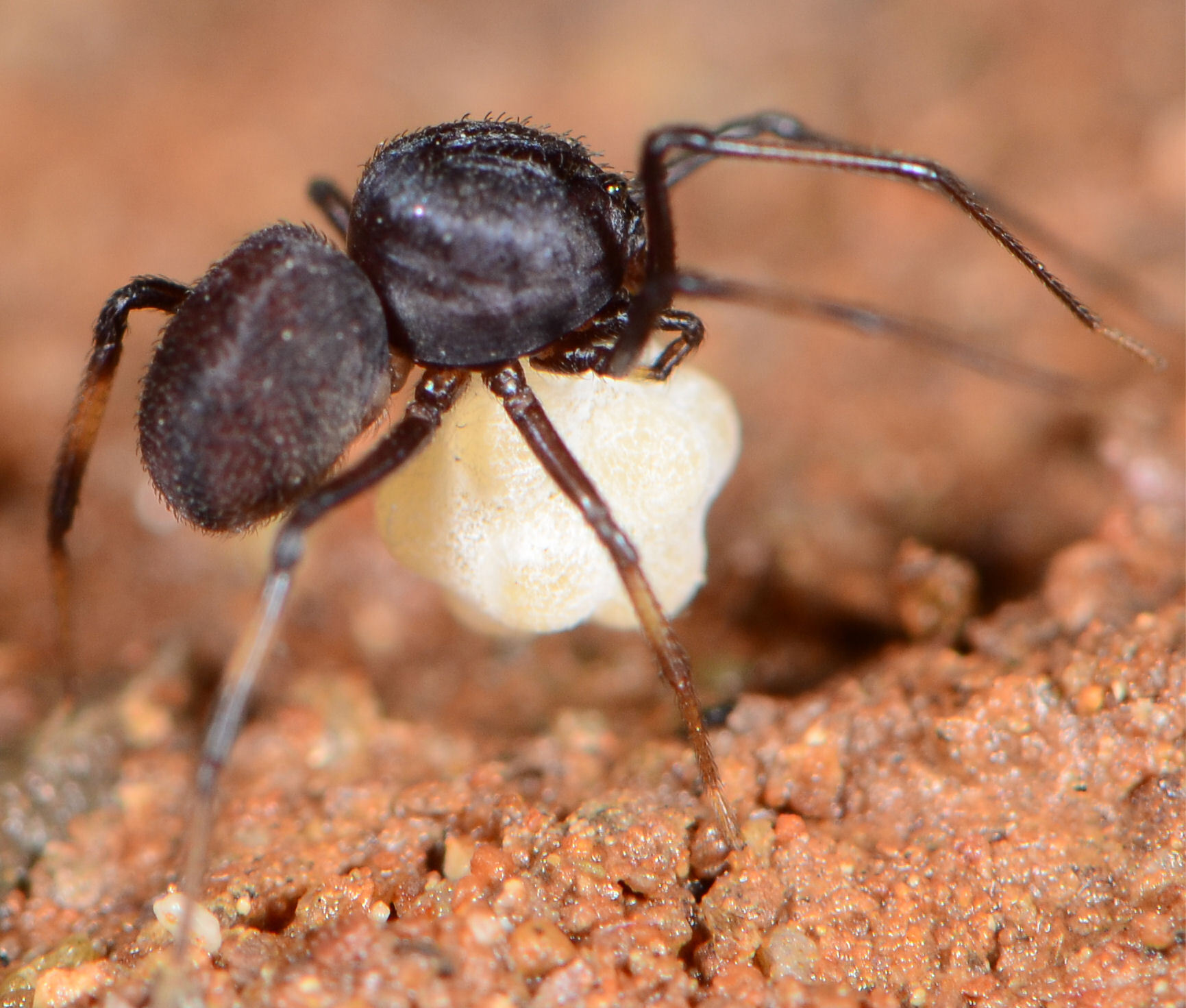
- Female with egg sac

Scientific classification
- Kingdom: Animalia
- Phylum: Arthropoda
- Subphylum: Chelicerata
- Class: Arachnida
- Order: Araneae
- Infraorder: Araneomorphae
- Family: Scytodidae
- Genus: Scytodes
- Species: S. elizabethae

Binomial name
- Scytodes elizabethae Purcell, 1904

= Scytodes elizabethae =

Port Elizabeth Spitting Spider

Species of spider

Scytodes elizabethae is a species of spider in the family Scytodidae. It is commonly known as the Port Elizabeth spitting spider and is endemic to South Africa.

== Distribution ==
Scytodes elizabethae is recorded from four provinces in South Africa: the Eastern Cape, Free State, Gauteng, and Mpumalanga. Notable locations include Port Elizabeth, Klipriviersberg Nature Reserve, and Sterkspruit Nature Reserve. The species is found at elevations ranging from 7 to 1,816 m above sea level.

== Habitat and ecology ==
Scytodes elizabethae are wandering spiders commonly collected from under stones and in dark places on the soil surface in the Grassland and Thicket biomes.

== Description ==
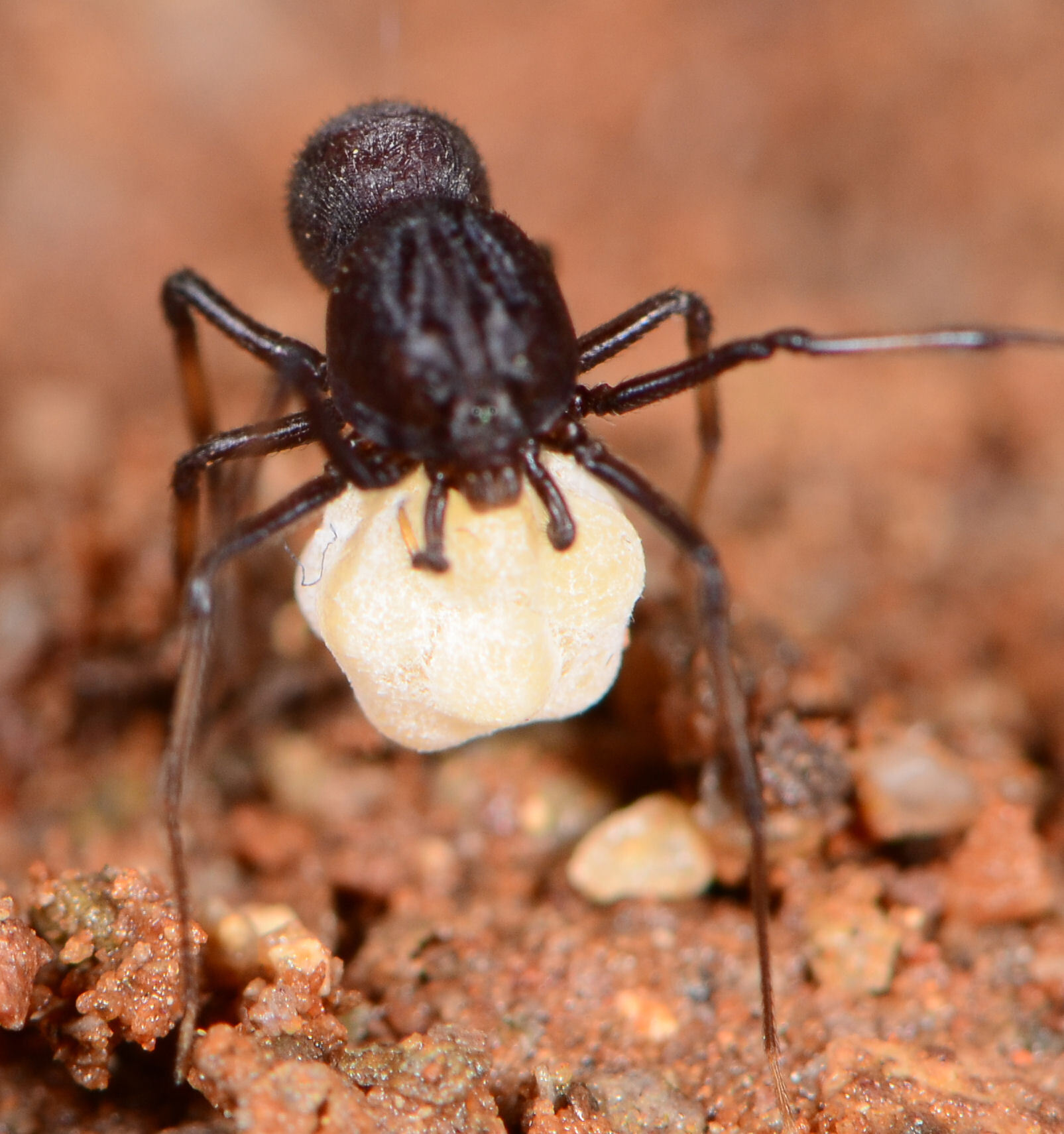
female

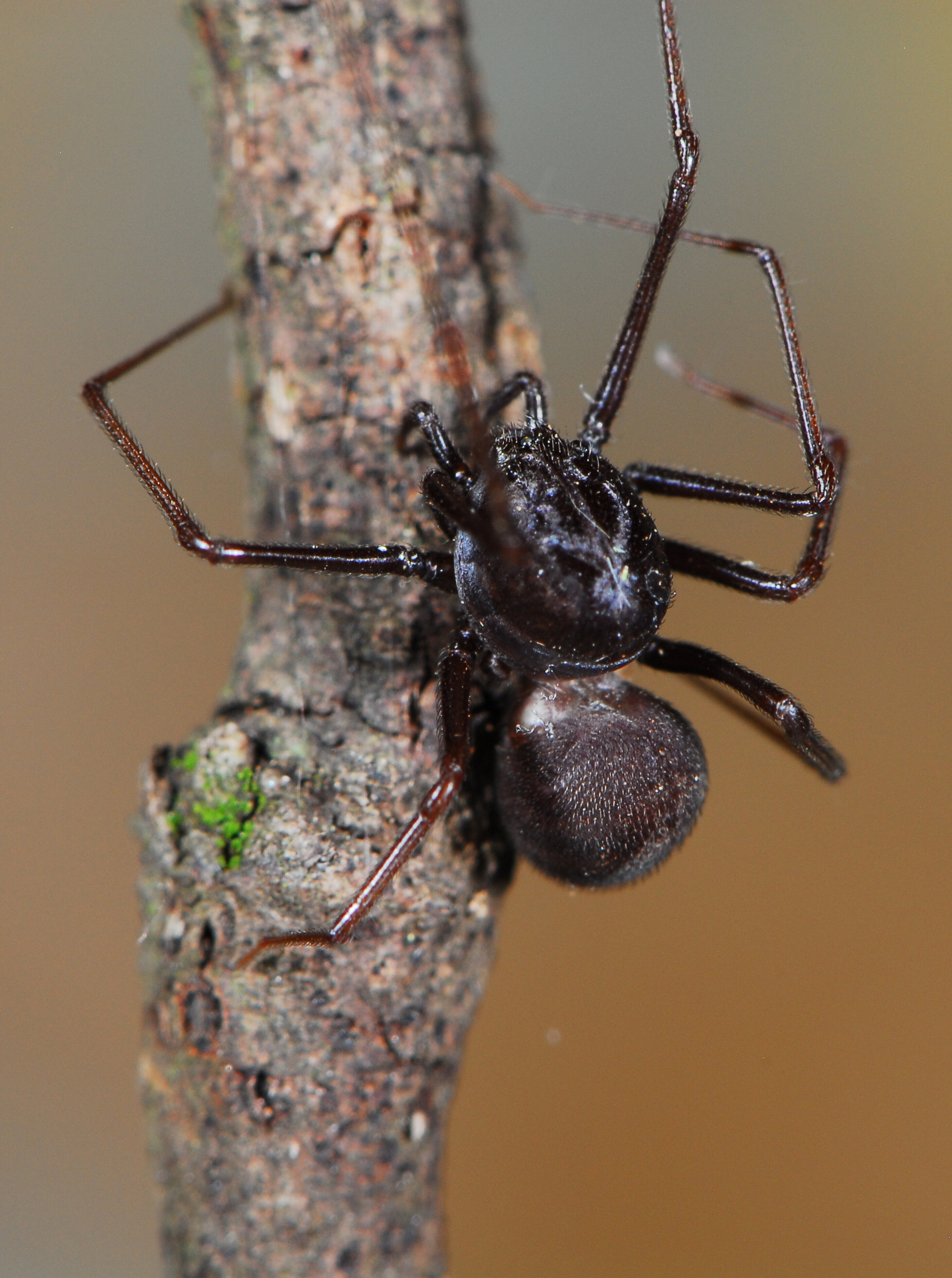
female

The palpal organ has a distal portion that is not straight but strongly sinuous. The carapace has three black stripes, with the median stripe reaching the highest point. The yellow lines that separate them are thin, and the lateral stripes are broad. The side of the carapace has a series of tiers. The abdomen has transverse bands and spots. Leg femora are infuscate.

== Conservation ==
Scytodes elizabethae is listed as Least Concern by the South African National Biodiversity Institute. Although the species is presently known only from one sex, it has a wide geographical range. There are no significant threats to the species. It is protected in Klipriviersberg Nature Reserve and Sterkspruit Nature Reserve.

== Taxonomy ==
The species has not been revised and is known only from the male, with the palpal organ illustrated.
