= Scytodes venusta =

Scientific classification
- Kingdom: Animalia
- Phylum: Arthropoda
- Subphylum: Chelicerata
- Class: Arachnida
- Order: Araneae
- Infraorder: Araneomorphae
- Family: Scytodidae
- Genus: Scytodes
- Species: S. venusta

Binomial name
- Scytodes venusta (Thorell, 1890)

Species of spider

Scytodes venusta is a species of spitting spider belonging to the genus of Scytodes. Its natural distribution extends from Sri Lanka to Java, and it has been documented as an introduced species in the Netherlands. Physically, the female of the species is characterized by a body length ranging from 4.75 to 5.5 mm.
