= Scytodes lawrencei =

Lawrence's Spitting Spider

Conservation status
- Least Concern (SANBI Red List)

Scientific classification
- Kingdom: Animalia
- Phylum: Arthropoda
- Subphylum: Chelicerata
- Class: Arachnida
- Order: Araneae
- Infraorder: Araneomorphae
- Family: Scytodidae
- Genus: Scytodes
- Species: S. lawrencei

Binomial name
- Scytodes lawrencei Lessert, 1939

Species of spider

Scytodes lawrencei is a species of spider in the family Scytodidae. It is commonly known as Lawrence's spitting spider and is found in East and Central Africa and South Africa.

== Distribution ==
Scytodes lawrencei is known from several African countries. In South Africa, it is under-sampled and known only from the Eastern Cape and Limpopo provinces. The species is found at elevations ranging from 19 to 574 m above sea level.

== Habitat and ecology ==
Scytodes lawrencei are wandering spiders commonly collected from under stones and in dark places on the soil surface. The species has been sampled from the Savanna biome.

== Conservation ==
Scytodes lawrencei is listed as Least Concern by the South African National Biodiversity Institute due to its wide geographical range in Africa. There are no significant threats to the species.

== Etymology ==
The species is named after R. F. Lawrence.

== Taxonomy ==
The species has not been revised and is known from both sexes, which have been illustrated.
