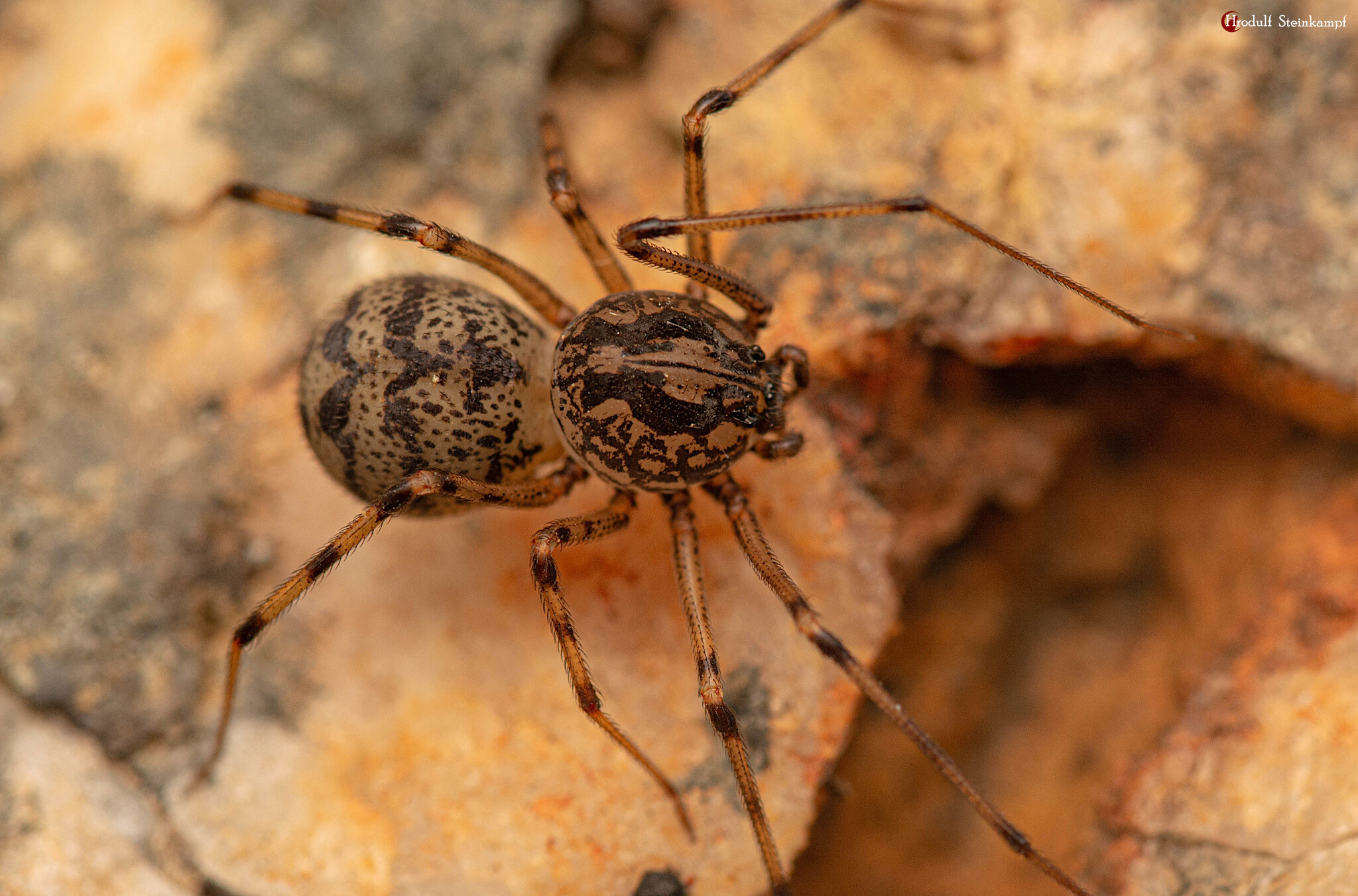
- female
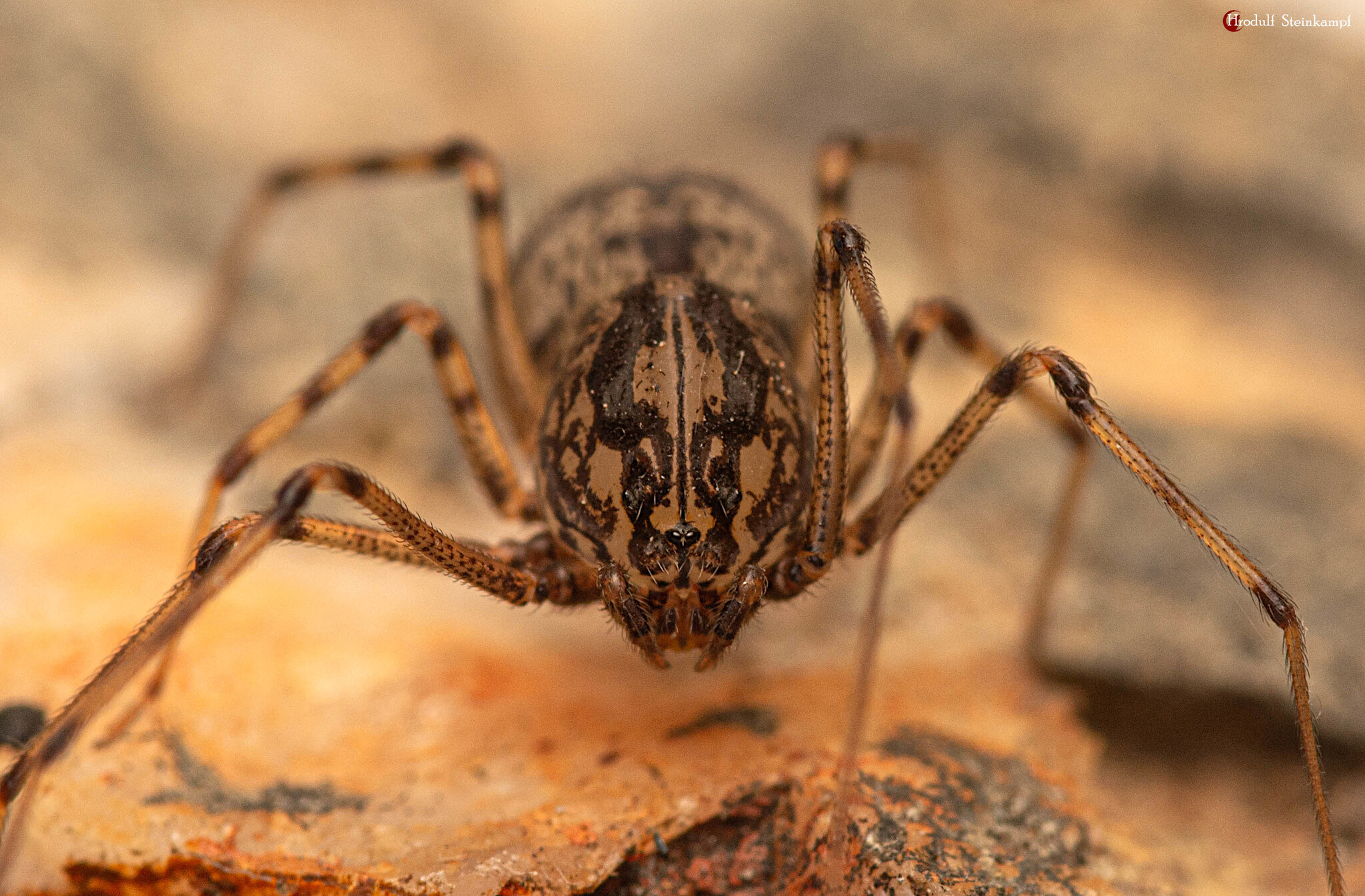
- female

Scientific classification
- Kingdom: Animalia
- Phylum: Arthropoda
- Subphylum: Chelicerata
- Class: Arachnida
- Order: Araneae
- Infraorder: Araneomorphae
- Family: Scytodidae
- Genus: Scytodes
- Species: S. testudo

Binomial name
- Scytodes testudo Purcell, 1904

= Scytodes testudo =

Cape Spitting Spider

Species of spider

Scytodes testudo is a species of spider in the family Scytodidae. It is endemic to South Africa and is commonly known as the Cape spitting spider.

== Distribution ==
Scytodes testudo is found only in the Western Cape Province, where it has been sampled from several localities across the province.

== Habitat and ecology ==
The species inhabits the Fynbos biome at altitudes ranging from 7 to 882 m above sea level. It is a wandering spider commonly collected from under stones and dark places on the soil surface. The species has also been found in vineyards around Stellenbosch.

== Description ==
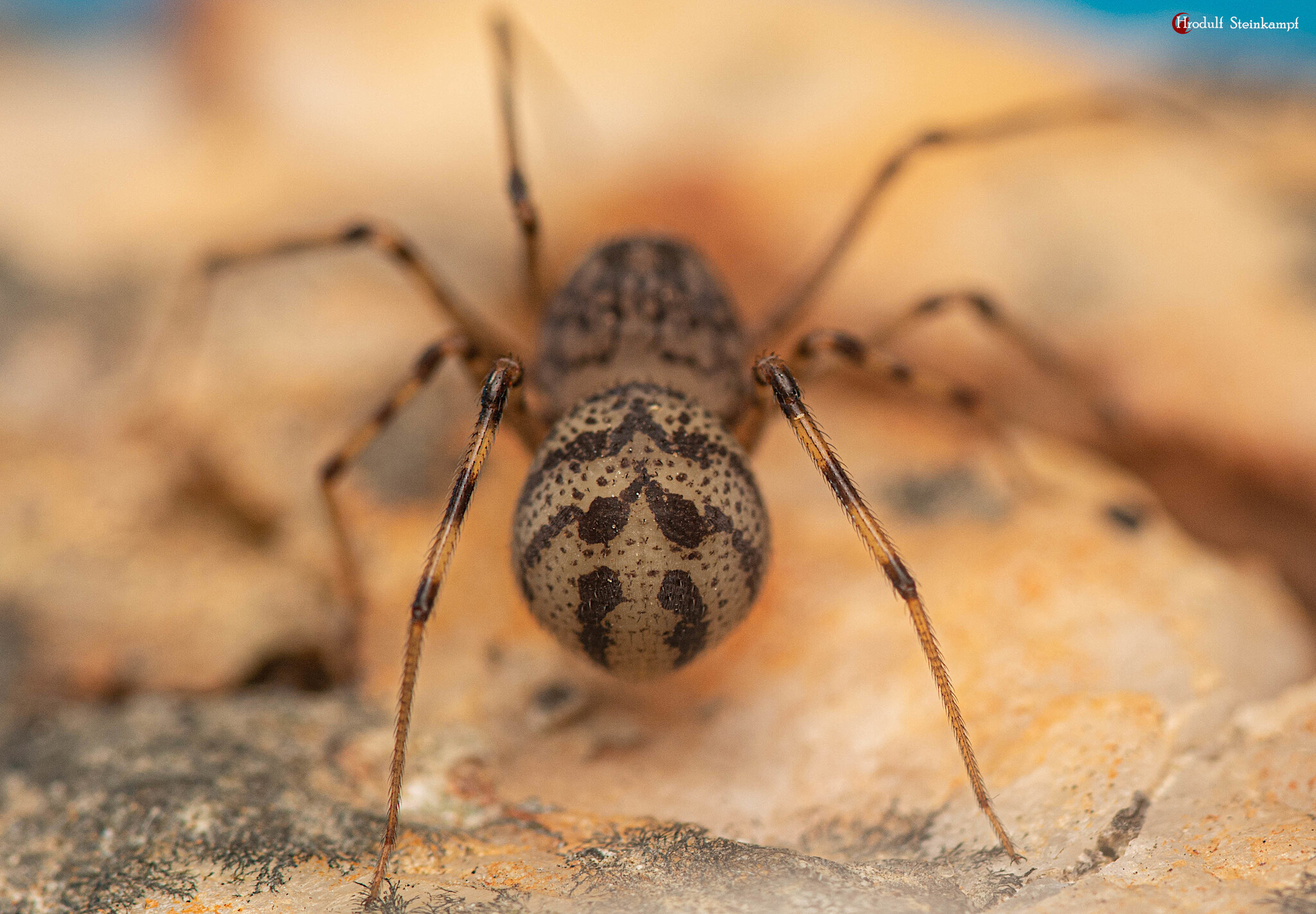
female

Scytodes testudo has a distinctive carapace with five stripes. The median black stripe reaches the highest point of the carapace. The black stripes on both sides of the median stripe turn at the posterior end but are united by a thick transverse patch. The outer stripe is very thick and C-shaped. The abdomen is banded and spotted.

== Conservation ==
Scytodes testudo is listed as Least Concern by the South African National Biodiversity Institute due to its wide geographical range. The species is protected in Table Mountain National Park and Kogelberg Biosphere Reserve.

== Etymology ==
The specific name is from Latin testudo "tortoise, turtle".

== Taxonomy ==
The species has not been revised and is known from both sexes. The genitalia have been illustrated.
