= Scytodes triangulifera =

Scientific classification
- Kingdom: Animalia
- Phylum: Arthropoda
- Subphylum: Chelicerata
- Class: Arachnida
- Order: Araneae
- Infraorder: Araneomorphae
- Family: Scytodidae
- Genus: Scytodes
- Species: S. triangulifera

Binomial name
- Scytodes triangulifera Purcell, 1904

Species of spider

Scytodes triangulifera is a species of spider in the family Scytodidae. It is endemic to South Africa.

== Distribution ==
Scytodes triangulifera is found in two South African provinces: Eastern Cape and Western Cape.

== Habitat and ecology ==
The species inhabits the Karoo and Succulent Karoo biomes at altitudes ranging from 614 to 844 m above sea level. It is a wandering spider collected from under stones and dark places on the soil surface.

== Description ==
Scytodes triangulifera has a distinctive carapace with a single, very broad black band on each side of the median yellow stripe above. The legs are yellow, with dark markings as follows: femur I is wholly dark, femur II is dark with two yellow bands, femora III and IV are yellow with two or three dark bands. The tibiae and metatarsi are for the most part dark, with tibiae III and IV being partially yellow.

== Conservation ==
Scytodes triangulifera is listed as Data Deficient by the IUCN for taxonomic reasons. The species is known from single localities and was sampled prior to 1904. More sampling is needed to collect males and determine the species' range.

== Etymology ==
The specific name is Latin for "triangle-bearing"

== Taxonomy ==
The species has not been revised and is known only from the female. It has been illustrated.
