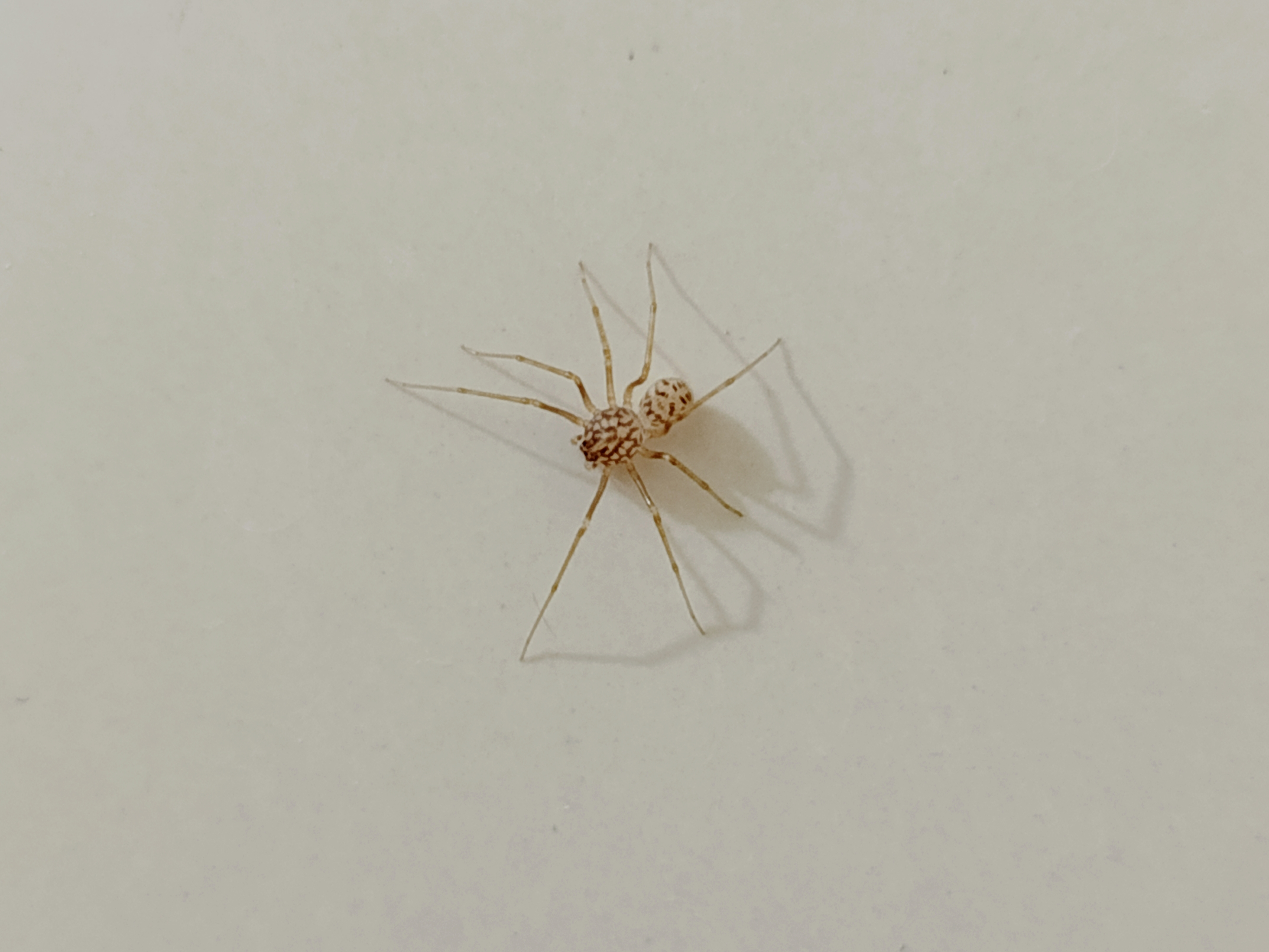

Scientific classification
- Kingdom: Animalia
- Phylum: Arthropoda
- Subphylum: Chelicerata
- Class: Arachnida
- Order: Araneae
- Infraorder: Araneomorphae
- Family: Scytodidae
- Genus: Scytodes
- Species: S. univittata

Binomial name
- Scytodes univittata Simon, 1882

= Scytodes univittata =

Species of spider

Scytodes univittata is a species of spitting spider in the family Scytodidae. It is generally found in Turkmenistan, Kyrgyzstan and India. This species has been introduced to Hawaii, Mexico, Cuba, Venezuela, Brazil, Paraguay, Chile, Canary Islands, Spain, Italy, Cyprus, Egypt and the mainland United States, where it has been found in Mississippi, Texas, Oklahoma, Louisiana, Florida, and Arizona. There is also a subspecies Scytodes u. unilineata endemic to Myanmar.

Scytodes catches its prey by shooting out a fast, zigzagging spray of sticky liquid silk from its fangs. It pins down the prey, making it easier for the spider to bite and subdue the prey.

They eat soft-bodied insects and other small arthropods, including flies, moths, mosquitoes, and silverfish. Many also prey on other spiders.

Mostly, you may find them in sheltered, dark places. Outside you can find them under rocks or bark, in leaf litter, and among vegetation. Inside they live in quiet corners such as cellars, cupboards, and closets.

== Subspecies ==
These two subspecies belong to the species Scytodes univittata:

- (Scytodes univittata univittata) Simon, 1882 - Turkmenistan, Kyrgyzstan, India. Introduced to Hawaii, Mexico, Cuba, Venezuela, Brazil, Paraguay, Chile, Canary Is., Spain, Italy, Cyprus, Egypt
- Scytodes univittata unilineata Thorell, 1887 - Myanmar
