= Scytodes quinqua =

Namibia Spitting Spider

Conservation status
- Least Concern (SANBI Red List)

Scientific classification
- Kingdom: Animalia
- Phylum: Arthropoda
- Subphylum: Chelicerata
- Class: Arachnida
- Order: Araneae
- Infraorder: Araneomorphae
- Family: Scytodidae
- Genus: Scytodes
- Species: S. quinqua

Binomial name
- Scytodes quinqua Lawrence, 1927

Species of spider

Scytodes quinqua is a species of spider in the family Scytodidae. It is found in Namibia and South Africa and is commonly known as the Namibia spitting spider.

== Distribution ==
Scytodes quinqua is found in Namibia and South Africa, where it is known only from Limpopo Province.

== Habitat and ecology ==
The species inhabits the Savanna biome at altitudes ranging from 894 to 1372 m above sea level. It is a wandering spider collected from under stones and dark places on the soil surface.

== Description ==
Scytodes quinqua has a short central stripe just behind the eyes which continues in front of the eyes to the edge of the clypeus. The legs have coxae and trochanters without markings, except the first coxa which has an indistinct apical stripe. The femora of legs I and II have an indistinct basal, a median, and an apical band, while legs III and IV have irregular spots and blotches throughout.

== Conservation ==
Scytodes quinqua is listed as Least Concern by the South African National Biodiversity Institute due to its wide geographical range. The species is protected in Blouberg Nature Reserve.

== Taxonomy ==
The species has not been revised and is known only from juveniles. The carapace has been illustrated.
