= Scytodes silvatica =

Forest Spitting Spider

Conservation status
- Least Concern (SANBI Red List)

Scientific classification
- Kingdom: Animalia
- Phylum: Arthropoda
- Subphylum: Chelicerata
- Class: Arachnida
- Order: Araneae
- Infraorder: Araneomorphae
- Family: Scytodidae
- Genus: Scytodes
- Species: S. silvatica

Binomial name
- Scytodes silvatica Purcell, 1904

Species of spider

Scytodes silvatica is a species of spider in the family Scytodidae. It is endemic to South Africa and is commonly known as the forest spitting spider.

== Distribution ==
Scytodes silvatica is found in two South African provinces, Eastern Cape and Western Cape.

== Habitat and ecology ==
The species inhabits the Forest, Savanna and Thicket biomes at altitudes ranging from 1 to 1479 m above sea level. It is a wandering spider commonly collected from under stones and dark places on the soil surface.

== Description ==
Scytodes silvatica has a deep brown or purplish-black colour, mottled with yellow. The carapace has a well-developed median stripe lying between a pair of broader yellow stripes, on each side of which is a very broad, curved, black band. The latter bears a small yellow spot just before the middle of the carapace. The sides of the carapace are broadly blackened inferiorly, with a row of four yellow spots on each side and a row of larger or smaller, more irregular yellow marks above these. The posterior part of the carapace has a median yellow spot.

== Conservation ==
Scytodes silvatica is listed as Least Concern by the South African National Biodiversity Institute due to its wide geographical range. The species is protected in Mkambathi Nature Reserve, Asante Sana Private Game Reserve, and Tsitsikamma National Park.

== Etymology ==
The species name is from Latin silvaticus "of the woods".

== Taxonomy ==
The species has not been revised and is known from both sexes, but has not been illustrated.
