= Scytodes gooldi =

Stompneus Spitting Spider

Conservation status
- Vulnerable (SANBI Red List)B1ab(ii,iii)+2ab(ii,iii)

Scientific classification
- Kingdom: Animalia
- Phylum: Arthropoda
- Subphylum: Chelicerata
- Class: Arachnida
- Order: Araneae
- Infraorder: Araneomorphae
- Family: Scytodidae
- Genus: Scytodes
- Species: S. gooldi

Binomial name
- Scytodes gooldi Purcell, 1904

Species of spider

Scytodes gooldi is a species of spider in the family Scytodidae. It is commonly known as the Stompneus spitting spider and is endemic to the Western Cape of South Africa.

== Distribution ==
Scytodes gooldi is endemic to the Western Cape province of South Africa. It is known from seven locations including Malmesbury, St James, St. Helena Bay, Table Mountain National Park, and Kirstenbosch National Botanical Garden. The species is found at elevations ranging from 109 to 170 m above sea level.

== Habitat and ecology ==
Scytodes gooldi are wandering spiders commonly collected from under stones and in dark places on the soil surface in the Fynbos biome.

== Description ==
The carapace has three black stripes above, with the median stripe narrow but well developed, of equal width throughout behind the median eyes and bordered on each side by a still narrower, straight, yellow line. The extremely broad, outer black bands have two pairs of yellow spots: one pair behind the lateral eyes and the other at the middle of the carapace. The sternum is black with a median yellow patch. Legs are strongly banded with black and yellow. The abdomen has dark markings.

== Conservation ==
Scytodes gooldi is listed as Vulnerable by the South African National Biodiversity Institute under criterion B1ab(ii,iii)+2ab(ii,iii). It is experiencing ongoing loss of habitat to crop cultivation and housing development and is therefore listed as Vulnerable. There is ongoing loss of habitat to crop cultivation on the West Coast and to urban and coastal housing development throughout its range.

== Taxonomy ==
The species has not been revised and is known from both sexes, with the epigyne illustrated.
