= Scytodes clavata =

Congo Spitting Spider

Conservation status
- Least Concern (SANBI Red List)

Scientific classification
- Kingdom: Animalia
- Phylum: Arthropoda
- Subphylum: Chelicerata
- Class: Arachnida
- Order: Araneae
- Infraorder: Araneomorphae
- Family: Scytodidae
- Genus: Scytodes
- Species: S. clavata

Binomial name
- Scytodes clavata Benoit, 1965

Species of spider

Scytodes clavata is a species of spider in the family Scytodidae. It is commonly known as the Congo spitting spider and is found in the Democratic Republic of the Congo and South Africa.

== Distribution ==
Scytodes clavata is known from two countries in Africa. In South Africa, it is recorded from two provinces: KwaZulu-Natal and Limpopo. The species is found at elevations ranging from 804 to 2,254 m above sea level.

== Habitat and ecology ==
Scytodes clavata are wandering spiders commonly collected from under stones and in dark places on the soil surface in the Savanna biome.

== Description ==
The carapace is strongly domed and decorated with particular strong setae inserted on small promontories. These setae feel arched forward and their end is truncated.

== Conservation ==
Scytodes clavata is listed as Least Concern by the South African National Biodiversity Institute. Although the species is presently known only from one sex, it has a wide geographical range. There are no significant threats to the species. It is protected in three protected areas, Blouberg Nature Reserve, Lhuvhondo Nature Reserve, and Thatevondo State Forest.

== Taxonomy ==
The species has not been revised and is known only from the female. An undescribed male has been collected from the Midlands.
