= Scytodes caffra =

Dark Spitting Spider

Conservation status
- Least Concern (SANBI Red List)

Scientific classification
- Kingdom: Animalia
- Phylum: Arthropoda
- Subphylum: Chelicerata
- Class: Arachnida
- Order: Araneae
- Infraorder: Araneomorphae
- Family: Scytodidae
- Genus: Scytodes
- Species: S. caffra

Binomial name
- Scytodes caffra Purcell, 1904

Species of spider

Scytodes caffra is a species of spider in the family Scytodidae. It is commonly known as the dark spitting spider and is found in the Democratic Republic of the Congo, Eswatini, and South Africa.

== Distribution ==
Scytodes caffra is known from three African countries. In South Africa, it is recorded from five provinces: Gauteng, KwaZulu-Natal, Limpopo, Mpumalanga, and the Western Cape. The species has a wide geographical range and is found at elevations ranging from 1 to 1,690 m above sea level.

== Habitat and ecology ==
Scytodes caffra is a free-living ground dweller. The species has been sampled from the Fynbos, Forest, Grassland, and Savanna biomes, as well as from commercial pine plantations.

== Description ==
The carapace is black, with the anterior two-thirds having a median yellow stripe containing a narrow, median black line which almost reaches to the middle of the carapace. The posterior surface of the carapace has a median yellow patch, and the sides have four tiers of rather small yellow spots. The carapace is very high, with its posterior surface almost vertical and its superior-anterior surface sloping at an angle of about 45° to the horizontal. The sternum is black.

The abdomen is transversely striped with black and yellow. Legs have infuscate femora.

== Conservation ==
Scytodes caffra is listed as Least Concern by the South African National Biodiversity Institute due to its wide geographical range. There are no significant threats to the species. It is protected in numerous protected areas including Ndumo Game Reserve, Ophathe Game Reserve, Kruger National Park, Legalameetse Nature Reserve, Blouberg Nature Reserve, and Fernkloof Nature Reserve.

== Taxonomy ==
The species has not been revised and is known from both sexes. The male was described by Lawrence in 1937.
