= Scytodes rubra =

Zululand Spitting Spider

Conservation status
- Least Concern (SANBI Red List)

Scientific classification
- Kingdom: Animalia
- Phylum: Arthropoda
- Subphylum: Chelicerata
- Class: Arachnida
- Order: Araneae
- Infraorder: Araneomorphae
- Family: Scytodidae
- Genus: Scytodes
- Species: S. rubra

Binomial name
- Scytodes rubra Lawrence, 1937

Species of spider

Scytodes rubra is a species of spider in the family Scytodidae. It is endemic to South Africa and is commonly known as the Zululand spitting spider.

== Distribution ==
Scytodes rubra is found in two South African provinces, Eastern Cape and KwaZulu-Natal.

== Habitat and ecology ==
The species inhabits the Forest and Savanna biomes at altitudes ranging from 47 to 1102 m above sea level. It is a wandering spider commonly collected from under stones and dark places on the soil surface.

== Description ==
Female Scytodes rubra has a distinctive coloration with the carapace, legs, sternum, coxae and mouthparts being reddish-brown. The carapace displays pattern markings with the lighter parts orange and the darker parts reddish-brown. The chelicerae are dark.

== Conservation ==
Scytodes rubra is listed as Least Concern by the South African National Biodiversity Institute due to its wide geographical range. The species is protected in Ndumo Game Reserve, Ophathe Game Reserve, and Addo Elephant National Park.

== Taxonomy ==
The species has not been revised and is known from both sexes. It has been illustrated.
