= List of Scytodidae species =

This page lists all described species of the spider family Scytodidae accepted by the World Spider Catalog as of January 2024:

== Dictis ==
Dictis L. Koch, 1872

- D. edwardsi Barrion, Barrion-Dupo & Heong, 2013 — China (Hainan)
- D. elongata Dankittipakul & Singtripop, 2010 — Thailand, Laos
- D. oranhutan Fomichev & Omelko, 2023 — Indonesia (Sumatra)
- D. soeur Saaristo, 1997 — Seychelles
- D. striatipes L. Koch, 1872 (type) — Yemen, United Arab Emirates, Iraq, Iran, tropical Asia, Korea, Japan, China to Australia, Pacific Isles. Introduced to USA, Mexico
- D. thailandica Dankittipakul & Singtripop, 2010 — Thailand
- D. uncata Wu, M. Y. Zhang, M. M. Zhang & Yang, 2023 — China

== Scyloxes ==
Scyloxes Dunin, 1992

- S. asiatica Dunin, 1992 (type) — Tajikistan
- S. magna Bristowe, 1952 — Malaysia
- S. zhaoi Wu & Li, 2017 — Thailand

== Scytodes ==
Scytodes

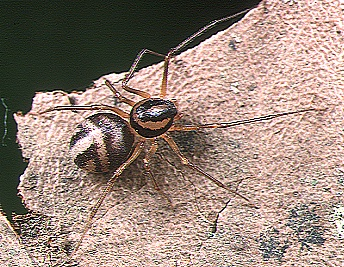
Brown spitting spider
(Scytodes fusca), female

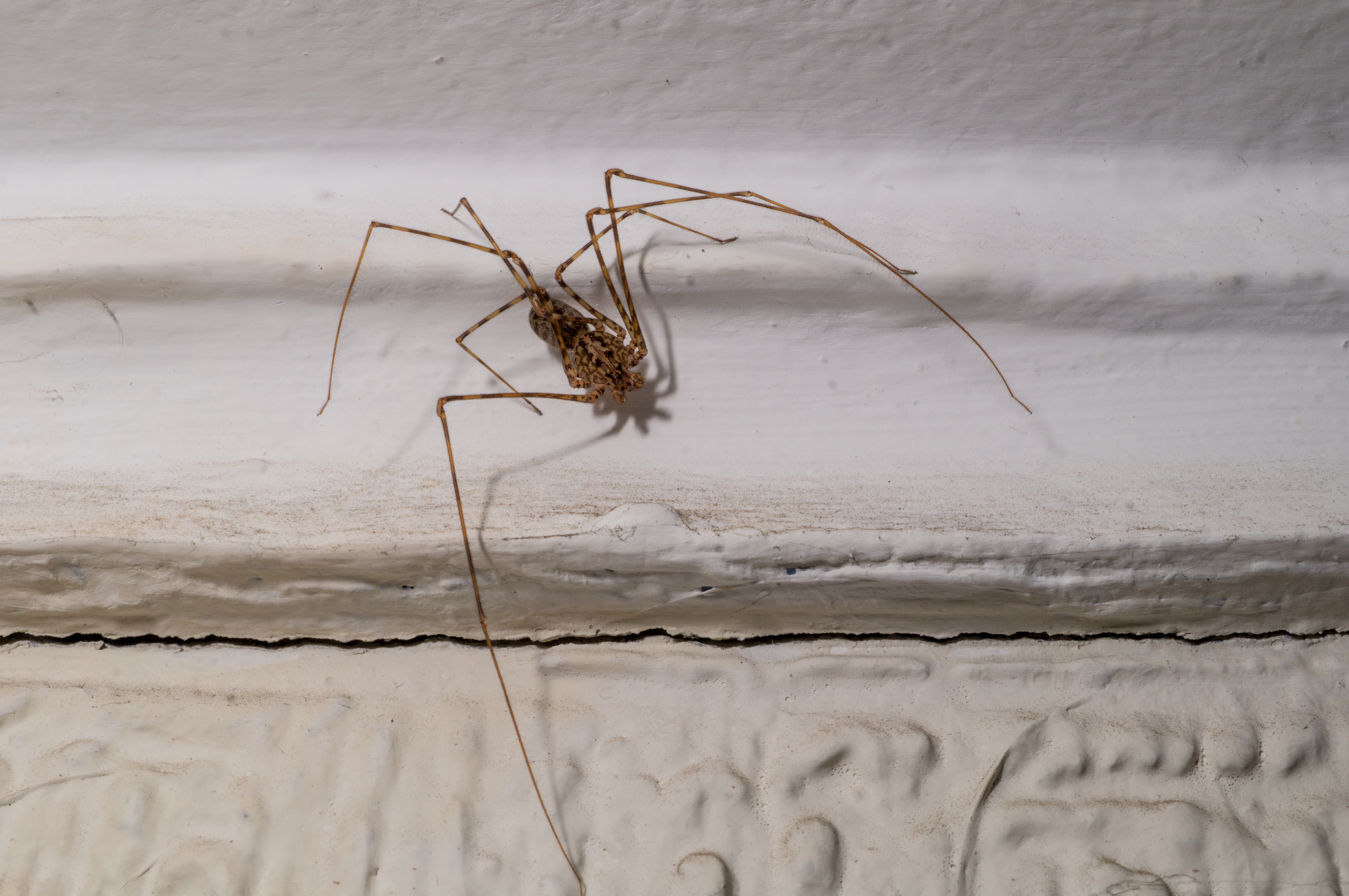
Chilean tiger spider
(Scytodes globula)

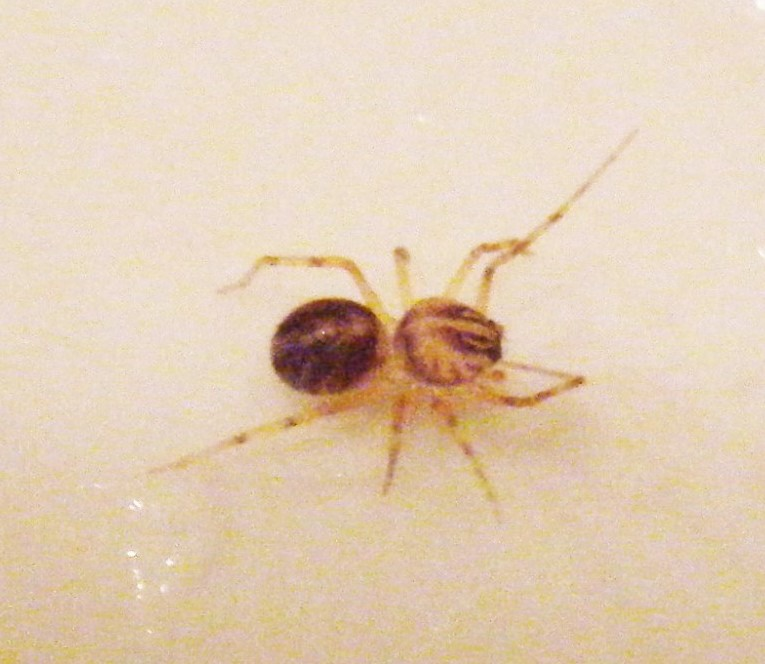
Scytodes velutina

Scytodes Latreille, 1804

- S. adisi Rheims & Brescovit, 2009 — Brazil
- S. aethiopica Simon, 1907 — Ethiopia
- S. affinis Kulczyński, 1901 — Ethiopia
- S. aharonii Strand, 1914 — Israel
- S. akytaba Rheims & Brescovit, 2006 — Brazil
- S. alayoi Alayón, 1977 — Mexico, Cuba
- S. albiapicalis Strand, 1907 — China
- S. alcomitzli Rheims, Brescovit & Durán-Barrón, 2007 — Mexico
- S. alfredi Gajbe, 2004 — India
- S. altamira Rheims & Brescovit, 2000 — Brazil
- S. annulipes Simon, 1907 — Algeria, Tunisia, Libya
- S. antonina Rheims & Brescovit, 2009 — Brazil
- S. apuecatu Rheims & Brescovit, 2006 — Brazil
- S. arboricola Millot, 1946 — Ivory Coast
- S. arenacea Purcell, 1904 — Namibia, South Africa
- S. armata Brescovit & Rheims, 2001 — Costa Rica
- S. aruensis Strand, 1911 — Indonesia (Aru Is.)
- S. arwa Rheims, Brescovit & van Harten, 2006 — Yemen, Iran
- S. atlacamani Rheims, Brescovit & Durán-Barrón, 2007 — Mexico
- S. atlacoya Rheims, Brescovit & Durán-Barrón, 2007 — Mexico
- S. atlatonin Rheims, Brescovit & Durán-Barrón, 2007 — Mexico
- S. auricula Rheims & Brescovit, 2000 — Brazil
- S. balbina Rheims & Brescovit, 2000 — Brazil
- S. becki Rheims & Brescovit, 2001 — Brazil
- S. bertheloti Lucas, 1838 — Mediterranean to Turkmenistan
- S. bilqis Rheims, Brescovit & van Harten, 2006 — Yemen
- S. blanda Bryant, 1940 — Cuba
- S. bocaina Rheims & Brescovit, 2009 — Brazil
- S. bonito Rheims & Brescovit, 2009 — Brazil
- S. brignolii Rheims & Brescovit, 2009 — Brazil
- S. broomi Pocock, 1902 — Namibia, South Africa
- S. brunnea González-Sponga, 2004 — Venezuela
- S. caffra Purcell, 1904 — South Africa
- S. caipora Rheims & Brescovit, 2004 — Brazil
- S. camerunensis Strand, 1906 — Cameroon
- S. canariensis Wunderlich, 1987 — Canary Is.
- S. caratinga Rheims & Brescovit, 2009 — Brazil
- S. caure Rheims & Brescovit, 2004 — Brazil
- S. cavernarum Roewer, 1962 — Malaysia
- S. cedri Purcell, 1904 — South Africa
- S. cellularis Simon, 1907 — Congo
- S. championi F. O. Pickard-Cambridge, 1899 — Mexico to Brazil
- S. chantico Rheims, Brescovit & Durán-Barrón, 2007 — Mexico
- S. chapeco Rheims & Brescovit, 2009 — Brazil
- S. chiconahui Rheims, Brescovit & Durán-Barrón, 2007 — Mexico
- S. chiquimula Brescovit & Rheims, 2001 — Guatemala
- S. chopim Rheims & Brescovit, 2009 — Brazil
- S. clavata Benoit, 1965 — Congo
- S. cogu Brescovit & Rheims, 2001 — Costa Rica
- S. congoanus Strand, 1908 — Congo
- S. constellata Lawrence, 1938 — South Africa
- S. coronata Thorell, 1899 — West Africa
- S. cotopitoka Rheims, Barreiros, Brescovit & Bonaldo, 2005 — Brazil
- S. cubensis Alayón, 1977 — Cuba, Trinidad
- S. curimaguana González-Sponga, 2004 — Venezuela
- S. curupira Rheims & Brescovit, 2004 — Brazil
- S. darlingtoni Alayón, 1977 — Cuba
- S. diminuta Valerio, 1981 — Costa Rica
- S. dissimulans Petrunkevitch, 1929 — Puerto Rico
- S. dollfusi Millot, 1941 — Ivory Coast
- S. domhelvecio Rheims & Brescovit, 2009 — Brazil
- S. dorothea Gertsch, 1935 — USA
- S. drakensbergensis Lawrence, 1947 — South Africa
- S. edwardsi Barrion, Barrion-Dupo & Heong, 2013 — China (Hainan)
- S. eleonorae Rheims & Brescovit, 2001 — Brazil
- S. elizabethae Purcell, 1904 — South Africa
- S. farri Alayón, 1985 — Jamaica
- S. flagellata Purcell, 1904 — South Africa
- S. florifera Yin & Xu, 2012 — China
- S. fourchei Lessert, 1939 — Central, East Africa
- S. fusca Walckenaer, 1837 — Central and Southern America. Introduced to Europe, tropical Africa, Seychelles, Myanmar, China, Japan, Hawaii
- S. genebra Rheims & Brescovit, 2009 — Brazil
- S. gertschi Valerio, 1981 — Panama
- S. gilva (Thorell, 1887) — India, Myanmar
- S. globula Nicolet, 1849 — Bolivia, Brazil, Argentina, Uruguay, Chile
- S. gooldi Purcell, 1904 — South Africa
- S. grammocephala Simon, 1909 — Vietnam
- S. guapiassu Rheims & Brescovit, 2009 — Brazil
- S. guttipes Simon, 1893 — Venezuela, Trinidad
- S. hahahae Rheims & Brescovit, 2001 — Brazil
- S. humilis L. Koch, 1875 — Ethiopia
- S. iabaday Rheims & Brescovit, 2001 — Brazil
- S. iara Rheims & Brescovit, 2004 — Brazil
- S. ilhota Rheims & Brescovit, 2009 — Brazil
- S. imbituba Rheims & Brescovit, 2009 — Brazil
- S. immaculata L. Koch, 1875 — Egypt, Greece
- S. insperata Soares & Camargo, 1948 — Brazil
- S. intricata Banks, 1909 — Mexico to Costa Rica
- S. itabaiana Rheims & Brescovit, 2009 — Brazil
- S. itacuruassu Rheims & Brescovit, 2006 — Brazil
- S. itapecerica Rheims & Brescovit, 2009 — Brazil
- S. itapevi Brescovit & Rheims, 2000 — Brazil
- S. itzana Chamberlin & Ivie, 1938 — Mexico
- S. itzli Rheims, Brescovit & Durán-Barrón, 2007 — Mexico
- S. janauari Brescovit & Höfer, 1999 — Brazil
- S. jousseaumei Simon, 1907 — Djibouti
- S. jurubatuba Rheims & Brescovit, 2009 — Brazil
- S. jurupari Rheims & Brescovit, 2004 — Brazil
- S. jyapara Rheims & Brescovit, 2006 — Brazil
- S. kaokoensis Lawrence, 1928 — Namibia
- S. karrooica Purcell, 1904 — South Africa
- S. kinsukus Patel, 1975 — India
- S. kinzelbachi Wunderlich, 1995 — Turkey, Jordan
- S. kumonga Zamani & Marusik, 2020 — Iran
- S. lanceolata Purcell, 1904 — South Africa
- S. lawrencei Lessert, 1939 — Central, East Africa
- S. leipoldti Purcell, 1904 — South Africa
- S. leprosula Strand, 1913 — Central Africa
- S. lesserti Millot, 1941 — Guinea
- S. lewisi Alayón, 1985 — Jamaica
- S. lineatipes Taczanowski, 1874 — Venezuela to Paraguay
- S. liui Wang, 1994 — China
- S. longipes Lucas, 1844 — Central and South America. Introduced to Guinea, DR Congo, Indonesia (New Guinea), Japan, Australia (Queensland), Pacific Is., Hawaii
  - S. l. simplex Franganillo, 1926 — Cuba
- S. lorenzoi Alayón, 1977 — Cuba
- S. lugubris (Thorell, 1887) — Tropical Asia. Introduced to Hawaii, Mexico
- S. luteola Simon, 1893 — Venezuela
- S. lycosella Purcell, 1904 — South Africa
- S. lyriformis Purcell, 1904 — South Africa
- S. magna Bristowe, 1952 — Malaysia
- S. major Simon, 1886 — Africa
- S. makeda Rheims, Brescovit & van Harten, 2006 — Yemen, Oman, Iran
- S. mangabeiras Rheims & Brescovit, 2009 — Brazil
- S. mapia Rheims & Brescovit, 2000 — Brazil
- S. mapinguari Rheims & Brescovit, 2004 — Brazil
- S. maquine Rheims & Brescovit, 2009 — Brazil
- S. maresi Rheims & Brescovit, 2001 — Brazil
- S. maritima Lawrence, 1938 — South Africa
- S. marlieria Rheims & Brescovit, 2009 — Brazil
- S. maromba Rheims & Brescovit, 2009 — Brazil
- S. marshalli Pocock, 1902 — South Africa
- S. martiusi Brescovit & Höfer, 1999 — Brazil
- S. mawphlongensis Tikader, 1966 — India, Nepal, Thailand
- S. mayahuel Rheims, Brescovit & Durán-Barrón, 2007 — Mexico
- S. montana Purcell, 1904 — South Africa
- S. monticola González-Sponga, 2004 — Venezuela
- S. multilineata Thorell, 1899 — West, Central Africa
- S. nambiobyrassu Rheims & Brescovit, 2009 — Brazil
- S. nambiussu Rheims & Brescovit, 2006 — Brazil
- S. nanahuatzin Rheims, Brescovit & Durán-Barrón, 2007 — Mexico
- S. nigristernis Simon, 1907 — Guinea-Bissau
- S. noeli Alayón, 1977 — Cuba
- S. obelisci Denis, 1947 — Egypt
- S. opoxtli Rheims, Brescovit & Durán-Barrón, 2007 — Mexico
- S. oswaldi Lenz, 1891 — Madagascar
- S. paarmanni Brescovit & Höfer, 1999 — Brazil
- S. pallida Doleschall, 1859 — India, China, Philippines, New Guinea
- S. panamensis Brescovit & Rheims, 2001 — Panama
- S. panguana Brescovit & Höfer, 1999 — Peru
- S. paramera González-Sponga, 2004 — Venezuela
- S. pholcoides Simon, 1898 — Seychelles
- S. pintodarochai Rheims & Brescovit, 2009 — Brazil
- S. piroca Rheims & Brescovit, 2000 — Brazil
- S. piyampisi Rheims, Barreiros, Brescovit & Bonaldo, 2005 — Brazil
- S. propinqua Stoliczka, 1869 — Pakistan, India
- S. pulchella Berland, 1914 — East Africa
- S. punctipes Simon, 1907 — São Tomé and Príncipe
- S. quarta Lawrence, 1927 — Namibia
- S. quattuordecemmaculata Strand, 1907 — China
- S. quinqua Lawrence, 1927 — Namibia
- S. redempta Chamberlin, 1924 — Mexico
- S. reticulata Jézéquel, 1964 — Ivory Coast
- S. robertoi Alayón, 1977 — Cuba
- S. rubra Lawrence, 1937 — South Africa
- S. ruizensis Strand, 1914 — Colombia
- S. rupestris González-Sponga, 2004 — Venezuela
- S. saaristoi Rheims & Brescovit, 2009 — Brazil
- S. saci Rheims & Brescovit, 2004 — Brazil
- S. sansibarica Strand, 1907 — Tanzania (Zanzibar)
- S. schultzei Purcell, 1908 — South Africa
- S. semipullata (Simon, 1909) — Tibet
- S. seppoi Bosmans & Van Keer, 2014 — Algeria, Tunisia
- S. sexstriata Roewer, 1960 — Afghanistan
- S. silvatica Purcell, 1904 — South Africa
- S. sincora Rheims & Brescovit, 2009 — Brazil
- S. skuki Rheims & Brescovit, 2001 — Brazil
- S. socialis Miller, 2006 — Madagascar
- S. sordida Dyal, 1935 — Pakistan
- S. stoliczkai Simon, 1897 — India
- S. strandi Spassky, 1941 — Iran, Central Asia
- S. strussmannae Rheims & Brescovit, 2001 — Brazil
- S. subadulta Strand, 1911 — Indonesia (Aru Is.)
- S. subulata Purcell, 1904 — South Africa
- S. symmetrica Lawrence, 1938 — South Africa
- S. tabuleiro Rheims & Brescovit, 2009 — Brazil
- S. tacapepucu Rheims & Brescovit, 2006 — Brazil
- S. tapacura Rheims & Brescovit, 2009 — Brazil
- S. tapuia Rheims & Brescovit, 2009 — Brazil
- S. tardigrada Thorell, 1881 — Myanmar, New Guinea, Australia (Queensland)
- S. tegucigalpa Brescovit & Rheims, 2001 — Honduras
- S. tenerifensis Wunderlich, 1987 — Canary Is.
- S. tertia Lawrence, 1927 — Angola, Namibia
- S. testudo Purcell, 1904 — South Africa
- S. tezcatlipoca Rheims, Brescovit & Durán-Barrón, 2007 — Mexico
- S. thoracica (Latreille, 1802) (type) — Europe, North Africa, Turkey, Iran, temperate Asia to China, Korea, Japan. Introduced to North America, Argentina, South Africa, India, Australia, New Zealand
- S. tinkuan Rheims & Brescovit, 2004 — Brazil
- S. tlaloc Rheims, Brescovit & Durán-Barrón, 2007 — Mexico
- S. triangulifera Purcell, 1904 — South Africa
- S. trifoliata Lawrence, 1938 — South Africa
- S. tropofila González-Sponga, 2004 — Venezuela
- S. turvo Rheims & Brescovit, 2009 — Brazil
- S. tuyucua Brescovit, Rheims & Raizer, 2004 — Brazil
- S. tyaia Rheims & Brescovit, 2009 — Brazil
- S. tyaiamiri Rheims & Brescovit, 2006 — Brazil
- S. tyaiapyssanga Rheims & Brescovit, 2006 — Brazil
- S. tzitzimime Rheims, Brescovit & Durán-Barrón, 2007 — Mexico
- S. uligocetes Valerio, 1981 — Costa Rica
- S. una Rheims & Brescovit, 2009 — Brazil
- S. univittata Simon, 1882 — Egypt, Iran, India, Turkmenia, Kirghizia. Introduced to Hawaii, Mexico, Cuba, Venezuela, Brazil, Paraguay, Chile, Canary Is., Spain
  - S. u. unilineata Thorell, 1887 — Myanmar
- S. upia Rheims & Brescovit, 2006 — Brazil
- S. vassununga Rheims & Brescovit, 2009 — Brazil
- S. vaurieorum Brescovit & Rheims, 2001 — Mexico, Guatemala
- S. velutina Heineken & Lowe, 1832 — Mediterranean, Cape Verde Is., Seychelles
- S. venusta (Thorell, 1890) — Sri Lanka to Indonesia (Java). Introduced to the Netherlands
- S. vieirae Rheims & Brescovit, 2000 — Brazil
- S. vittata Keyserling, 1877 — Colombia, Brazil
- S. xai Rheims & Brescovit, 2006 — Brazil
- S. ybyrapesse Rheims & Brescovit, 2006 — Brazil
- S. yphanta Wang, 1994 — China
- S. yssaiapari Rheims & Brescovit, 2006 — Brazil
- S. ytu Rheims & Brescovit, 2009 — Brazil
- S. zamena Wang, 1994 — China
- S. zamorano Brescovit & Rheims, 2001 — Honduras
- S. zapatana Gertsch & Mulaik, 1940 — USA

== Stedocys ==
Stedocys Ono, 1995

- S. amamiensis Suguro, 2019 — Japan
- S. gaolingensis Wu & Li, 2017 — China
- S. huangniuensis Wu & Li, 2017 — China
- S. leopoldi (Giltay, 1935) — Malaysia, Thailand
- S. ludiyanensis Wu & Li, 2017 — China
- S. matuoensis Wu & Li, 2017 — China
- S. pagodas Labarque, Grismado, Ramírez, Yan & Griswold, 2009 — China
- S. pulianensis Wu & Li, 2017 — China
- S. shilinensis Wu & Li, 2017 — China
- S. uenorum Ono, 1995 (type) — Thailand
- S. xiangzhouensis Wu & Li, 2017 — China
- S. xianrenensis Wu & Li, 2017 — China
- S. vittiformis Chen, Liang, Yin, Xu & Wei, 2021 — China
