= List of Drymusidae species =

This page lists all described species of the spider family Drymusidae accepted by the World Spider Catalog as of December 2020:

== Drymusa ==
Drymusa

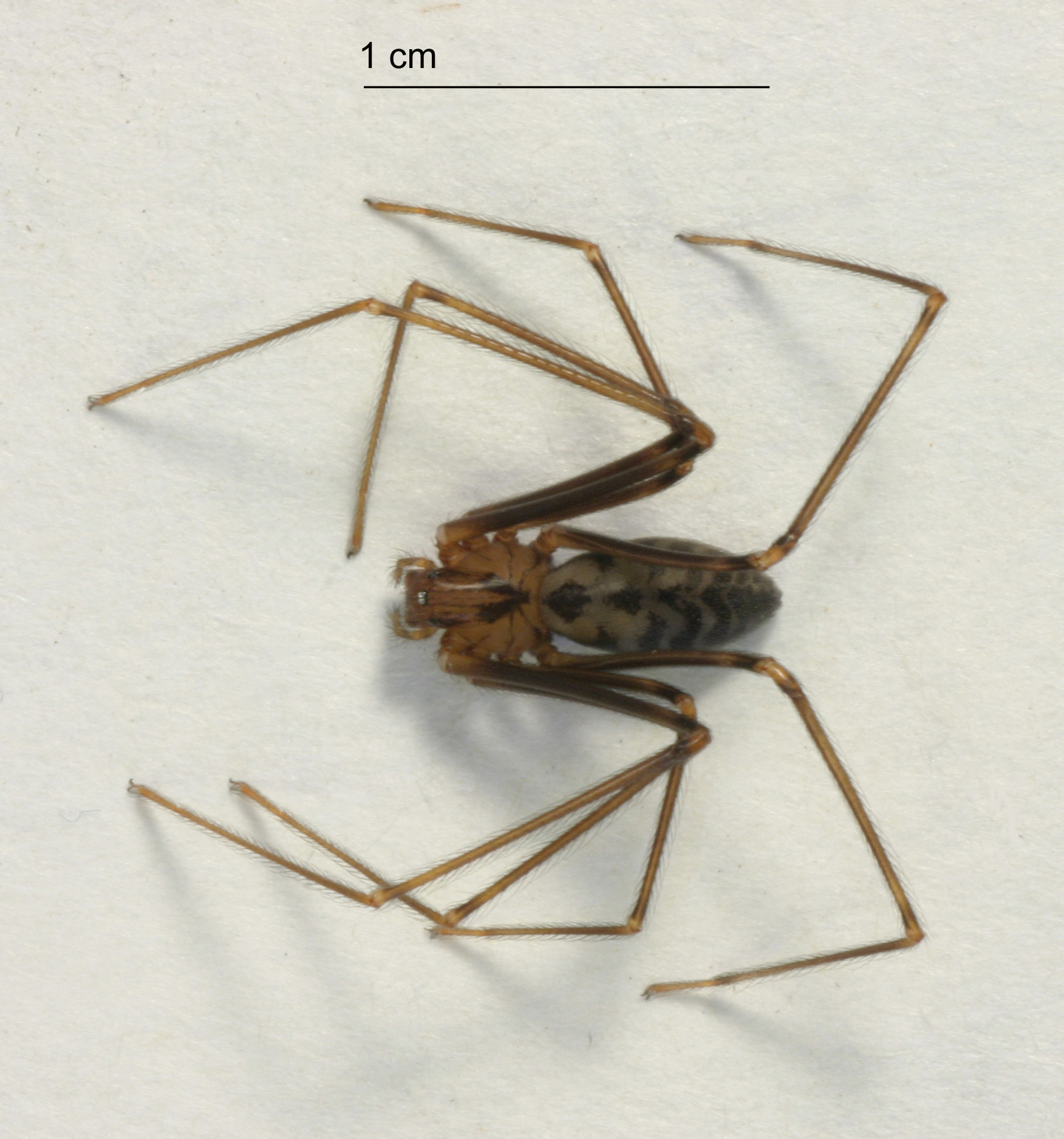
Drymusa sp.

Drymusa Simon, 1892

- D. armasi Alayón, 1981 — Cuba
- D. canhemabae Brescovit, Bonaldo & Rheims, 2004 — Brazil
- D. colligata Bonaldo, Rheims & Brescovit, 2006 — Brazil
- D. dinora Valerio, 1971 — Costa Rica
- D. nubila Simon, 1892 (type) — St. Vincent
- D. philomatica Bonaldo, Rheims & Brescovit, 2006 — Brazil
- D. rengan Labarque & Ramírez, 2007 — Chile
- D. serrana Goloboff & Ramírez, 1992 — Argentina
- D. simoni Bryant, 1948 — Hispaniola
- D. spectata Alayón, 1981 — Cuba
- D. spelunca Bonaldo, Rheims & Brescovit, 2006 — Brazil
- D. tobyi Bonaldo, Rheims & Brescovit, 2006 — Brazil

== Izithunzi ==
Izithunzi Labarque, Pérez-González & Griswold, 2018

- I. capense (Simon, 1893) (type) — South Africa
- I. lina Labarque, Pérez-González & Griswold, 2018 — South Africa
- I. productum (Purcell, 1904) — South Africa
- I. silvicola (Purcell, 1904) — South Africa
- I. zondii Labarque, Pérez-González & Griswold, 2018 — South Africa
