= Izithunzi productum =

Scientific classification
- Kingdom: Animalia
- Phylum: Arthropoda
- Subphylum: Chelicerata
- Class: Arachnida
- Order: Araneae
- Infraorder: Araneomorphae
- Family: Drymusidae
- Genus: Izithunzi
- Species: I. productum

Binomial name
- Izithunzi productum (Purcell, 1904)

Synonyms
- Drymusa producta Purcell, 1904

Species of spider

Izithunzi productum is a species of spider in the family Drymusidae, commonly known as the Swellendam false violin spider. It is endemic to the Western Cape province of South Africa.

== Taxonomy ==
The species was originally described by W. F. Purcell in 1904 as Drymusa producta based on female specimens collected from Swellendam. It was later transferred to the genus Izithunzi by Labarque, Pérez-González and Griswold in 2018, who also provided the first description of the male.

== Distribution ==
Izithunzi productum is known from the Langeberg Mountains in the Western Cape province of South Africa, ranging from Swellendam to Grootvadersbosch Nature Reserve and surrounding areas. The species has a very restricted distribution, occurring at elevations between 104 and 422 meters above sea level.

== Habitat ==
This species inhabits indigenous forests in the Forest biome and is found on the ground under debris. They construct loosely spun space webs, sometimes with sheet-like or tube-like extensions.

== Description ==
Females have a total length of 5.65 mm. The opisthosoma is 4.0 mm long and 2.7 mm wide. The overall coloration is dark brown and smooth, lacking chevron patterns. The chelicerae have four bracket setae on the promargin and a row of six macrosetae. The leg formula is 1243, with the first leg being the longest.

Males are smaller than females, with a total length of 4.95 mm. They have a lighter coloration than females with a reduced V-shaped pattern on the opisthosoma. The male pedipalps have distinctive features including a thick, distally blunt prolateral femoral thorn and swollen tibiae. The copulatory bulb has a short, truncated apex that appears slightly curved in lateral and apical views.

Females can be distinguished from the closely related Izithunzi silvicola by having the posterior border of the epigastrium covered with small, dark, thick setae, lateral sclerotized grooves that almost touch each other, and a completely integrated dorsal receptaculum lacking muscle insertions.

== Conservation ==
Izithunzi productum is classified as rare due to its small and restricted distribution range. While the species occurs within the protected Grootvadersbosch Nature Reserve, it faces threats from habitat loss due to infrastructure development, crop cultivation, and deforestation around Swellendam. Additional sampling is needed to better determine the species' full range and population status.
