= Scytodes subulata =

Scientific classification
- Kingdom: Animalia
- Phylum: Arthropoda
- Subphylum: Chelicerata
- Class: Arachnida
- Order: Araneae
- Infraorder: Araneomorphae
- Family: Scytodidae
- Genus: Scytodes
- Species: S. subulata

Binomial name
- Scytodes subulata Purcell, 1904

Species of spider

Scytodes subulata is a species of spider in the family Scytodidae. It is endemic to South Africa.

== Distribution ==
Scytodes subulata is found only in the Western Cape Province, where it is known from Malmesbury and St. Helena Bay Stompneus.

== Habitat and ecology ==
The species inhabits the Fynbos biome at an altitude of 109 m above sea level. It is a wandering spider collected from under stones and dark places on the soil surface.

== Description ==
On the carapace, the posterior half of each inner stripe is separated from the anterior half just behind the transverse bridge which joins the outer and inner stripes, while the femora of the legs are not spotted but provided with a very distinct basal, mesial, and distal black band. The markings closely resemble those of S. leipoldti.

== Conservation ==
Scytodes subulata is listed as Data Deficient by the IUCN. The status of the species remains obscure and more sampling is needed to determine the species' range.

== Taxonomy ==
The species has not been revised and is known from both sexes, but has not been illustrated.
