= Violin spider =

Violin spider may refer to:

- Recluse spider, genus Loxosceles
- Drymusa, a genus of false violin spiders
