= Izithunzi zondii =

Conservation status
- Data Deficient (IUCN 3.1)

Scientific classification
- Kingdom: Animalia
- Phylum: Arthropoda
- Subphylum: Chelicerata
- Class: Arachnida
- Order: Araneae
- Infraorder: Araneomorphae
- Family: Drymusidae
- Genus: Izithunzi
- Species: I. zondii

Binomial name
- Izithunzi zondii Labarque, Pérez-González & Griswold, 2018

Species of spider

Izithunzi zondii is a species of spider in the family Drymusidae. It is endemic to KwaZulu-Natal, South Africa. The species is commonly known as the KwaZulu-Natal false violin spider.

== Etymology ==
The specific name zondii is a patronym honouring Mathew Sibusiso Zondi, who taught author Griswold to say "hello", "thank you" and "we are collecting spiders" in Zulu.

== Distribution and habitat ==
Izithunzi zondii is known from two locations in KwaZulu-Natal Province: the Natal Karkloof area, approximately 50 km north-northwest of Pietermaritzburg, and the coastal iSimangaliso Wetland Park. The species occurs at elevations ranging from 24 to 847 metres above sea level.

The spider inhabits the Forest and Indian Ocean Coastal Belt biomes, where it constructs loosely spun space webs, sometimes with sheet- or tube-like extensions. The retreat is typically positioned at one side of the web.

== Description ==
Only females of I. zondii are known. The total body length is 9.04 mm.

The thoracic area displays darkish dun lateral margins and a central V-shaped pattern. The chelicerae have three bracket setae on the promargin and a row of seven macrosetae against a triangular lamina. The labium is dun-coloured, reddish at the narrow area and white at the apex, while the sternum is dun-coloured.

The legs show distinct colouration with the femora and tibiae being dun-coloured, while the patellae, metatarsi and tarsi are tan. The leg formula is 1423, with leg I being the longest at 33.64 mm total length.

The opisthosoma is overall dark brown with thick chevrons extending anteriorly. These chevrons are well-spaced anteriorly but clustered posteriorly, with the first two forming a continuum.

Females can be distinguished from the closely related Izithunzi lina by the anterior vulval plate being strongly curved anteriorly (inverted V-shaped), the posterior plate being straight, and the dorsal receptaculum being partially integrated to the posterior plate. The outer spermathecae are minute while the inner spermathecae are oval-shaped.

== Conservation status ==
Izithunzi zondii is listed as Data Deficient due to taxonomic reasons, as males remain unknown and the species' full range is poorly understood. The species is protected within the iSimangaliso Wetland Park, and no specific conservation actions are currently recommended.
