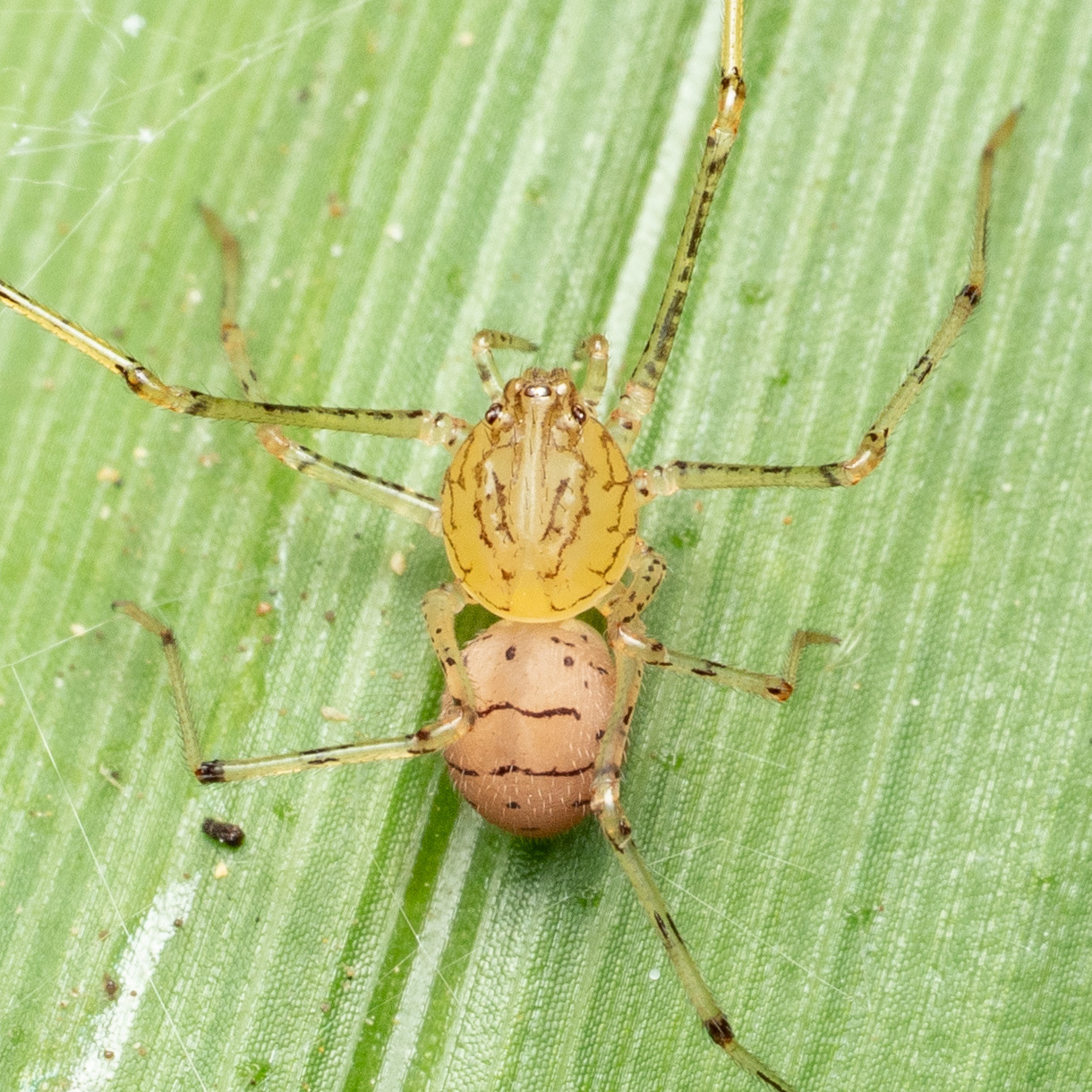
- S. armata from Costa Rica

Scientific classification
- Kingdom: Animalia
- Phylum: Arthropoda
- Subphylum: Chelicerata
- Class: Arachnida
- Order: Araneae
- Infraorder: Araneomorphae
- Family: Scytodidae
- Genus: Scytodes
- Species: S. armata

Binomial name
- Scytodes armata Brescovit & Rheims, 2001

Synonyms
- Scytodes championi Valerio, 1981 (misidentification)

= Scytodes armata =

Species of spider

Scytodes armata is a species of spitting spider in the family Scytodidae. It is endemic to Costa Rica.

== Taxonomy ==
The species was first described by Antonio Domingos Brescovit and Cristina Anne Rheims in 2001. Prior to its formal description, specimens of S. armata had been misidentified as Scytodes championi by Valerio in 1981.

The specific name armata refers to the strong ventral spines along the male's first and second pairs of legs.

== Distribution ==
S. armata is known from several localities in Costa Rica, including La Selva in Heredia Province, Cahuita in Limón Province, and Monteverde in Puntarenas Province.

== Description ==
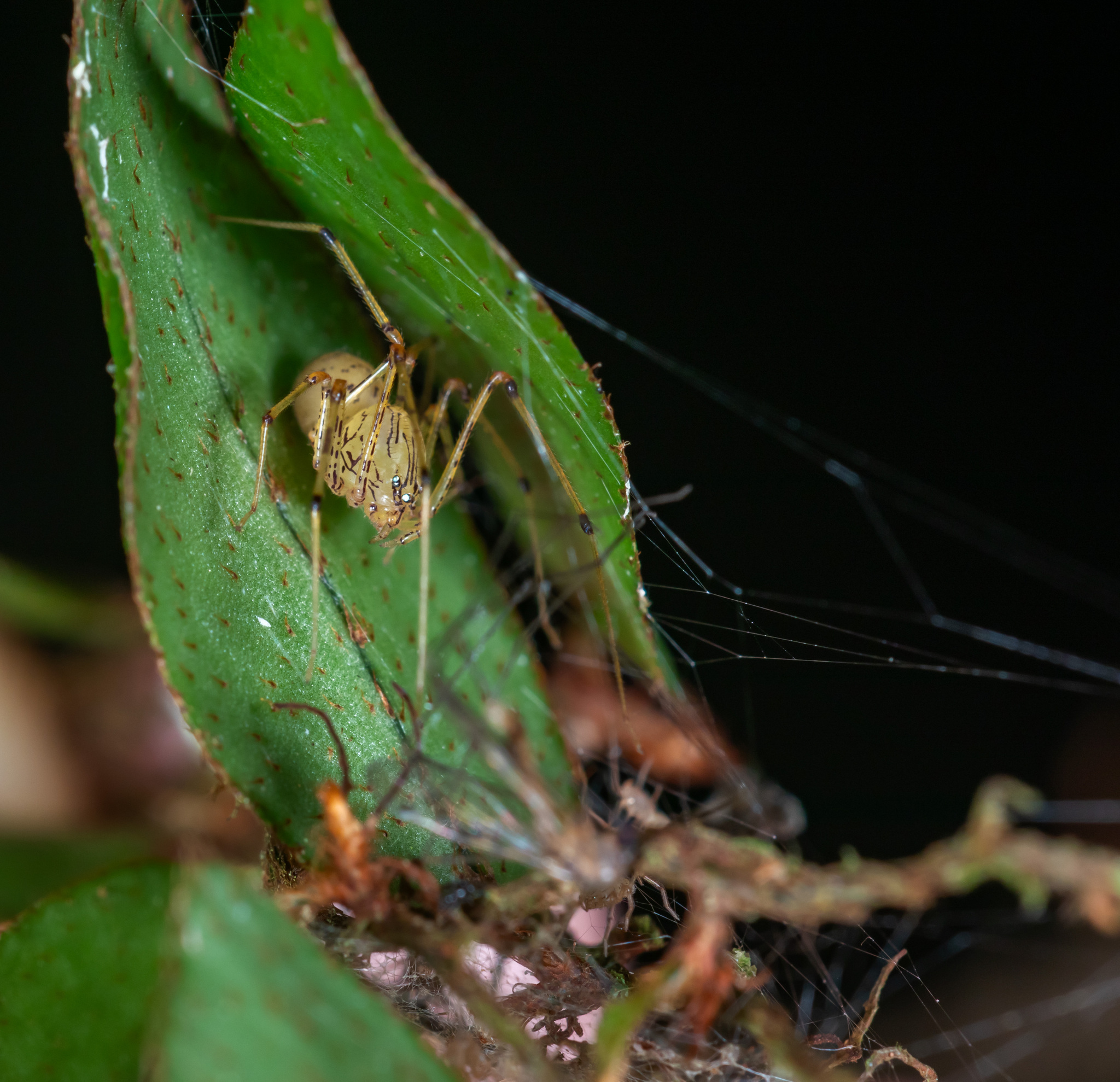
S. armata in web

Scytodes armata is a medium-sized spider with males reaching a total length of 4.38–5.50 mm and females 6.25–6.75 mm.

Males have a yellow carapace with brown patterns and cream-colored abdomen with dark brown transverse stripes. The legs are yellow with brown longitudinal markings along the underside of the femora.

The species can be distinguished from related spiders by several characteristics. Males have a distinctive double row of spines along the underside of both the first and second pairs of legs, and a tubular projection on the male reproductive structure (pedipalp). Females have rounded, mushroom-like reproductive structures and a straight posterior margin on the epigyne.
