= Izithunzi silvicola =

Conservation status
- Data Deficient (IUCN 3.1)

Scientific classification
- Kingdom: Animalia
- Phylum: Arthropoda
- Subphylum: Chelicerata
- Class: Arachnida
- Order: Araneae
- Infraorder: Araneomorphae
- Family: Drymusidae
- Genus: Izithunzi
- Species: I. silvicola

Binomial name
- Izithunzi silvicola (Purcell, 1904)

Synonyms
- Drymusa silvicola Purcell, 1904

Species of false violin spider

Izithunzi silvicola is a species of spider in the family Drymusidae. It is endemic to South Africa, where it is known as the Knysna false violin spider.

The specific epithet silvicola means "forest-dwelling" in Latin, referring to the species' habitat preference for indigenous forests.

== Taxonomy ==
The species was originally described as Drymusa silvicola by W. F. Purcell in 1904. It was transferred to the genus Izithunzi by Labarque, Pérez-González & Griswold in 2018 as part of their comprehensive revision of African Drymusidae based on molecular phylogenetic analysis.

== Distribution ==
Izithunzi silvicola is endemic to South Africa, where it is recorded from the Western Cape and Eastern Cape provinces. The species has been found in several protected areas including Knysna forests, Harkerville State Forest, Diepwalle Forest Station, and Tsitsikamma National Park. Its distribution is restricted to the Knysna-Amatola montane forests.

== Habitat ==
Izithunzi silvicola inhabits indigenous forests within the Forest biome of South Africa. The species is typically found on the ground under debris or in holes within tree trunks. It occurs at elevations ranging from 1 to 466 metres above sea level.

== Description ==
Izithunzi silvicola exhibits typical sexual dimorphism, with females being larger than males. The female has a total length of 8.8 mm. The leg formula is 1423, meaning the first legs are longest followed by the fourth, second, and third legs.

Females are characterized by an epigastrium plate extending posteriorly beyond the middle of the opisthosoma, and a triangular, swollen postepigastrium plate located below the epigastric furrow. The chelicerae have six bracket setae on the promargin and an extra small tooth next to the apical tooth on the cheliceral furrow. The overall coloration is dark brown without chevron patterns on the opisthosoma.

Males are smaller with a total length of 5.93 mm and lighter coloration than females. The male pedipalp is elongated with a swollen cymbium that is 1.5 times longer than the base of the copulatory bulb.

== Conservation status ==
Izithunzi silvicola is considered rare due to its small and restricted distribution range. The species is threatened by habitat loss from urbanization around Knysna. However, it is protected within several conservation areas including Keurboom Nature Reserve, Knysna Forest, Harkerville State Forest, Diepwalle Forest Station, and Tsitsikamma National Park. More sampling is needed to better understand the species' conservation status and population trends.
