= Scyloxes =

Scientific classification
- Kingdom: Animalia
- Phylum: Arthropoda
- Subphylum: Chelicerata
- Class: Arachnida
- Order: Araneae
- Infraorder: Araneomorphae
- Family: Scytodidae
- Genus: Scyloxes; Dunin, 1992

Type species
- S. asiatica Dunin, 1992

Species
- Scyloxes asiatica Dunin, 1992; Scyloxes magna Bristowe, 1952; Scyloxes zhaoi Wu & Li, 2017

Genus of spiders

Scyloxes is a genus of Tajikistani spitting spiders containing three species. It was first described by P. M. Dunin in 1992 and remained a monotypic genus until 2022, when Zamani et al. moved two species into the genus, S. magna and S. zhaoi, from Scytodes and Stedocys, respectively. It is found in Tajikistan, Malaysia and Thailand.
