= Scytodes cedri =

Cederberg Spitting Spider

Conservation status
- Least Concern (SANBI Red List)

Scientific classification
- Kingdom: Animalia
- Phylum: Arthropoda
- Subphylum: Chelicerata
- Class: Arachnida
- Order: Araneae
- Infraorder: Araneomorphae
- Family: Scytodidae
- Genus: Scytodes
- Species: S. cedri

Binomial name
- Scytodes cedri Purcell, 1904

Species of spider

Scytodes cedri is a species of spider in the family Scytodidae. It is commonly known as the Cederberg spitting spider and is endemic to South Africa.

== Distribution ==
Scytodes cedri is recorded from two provinces in South Africa: the Eastern Cape and Western Cape. Notable locations include Addo Elephant National Park, Mountain Zebra National Park, Jeffreysbay, Cederberg Wilderness Area, De Hoop Nature Reserve, and Bontebok National Park. The species is found at elevations ranging from 15 to 1,513 m above sea level.

== Habitat and ecology ==
Scytodes cedri are wandering spiders commonly collected from under stones and in dark places on the soil surface. The species has been sampled from the Fynbos and Nama Karoo biomes.

== Description ==
The carapace has a well-developed mid black stripe reaching the highest point, lying between two yellow stripes from the median eyes to the posterior edge where they merge. On both sides there is a yellow stripe and a broad dark stripe. The abdomen is pale yellow and hardly spotted. Legs are infuscate.

== Conservation ==
Scytodes cedri is listed as Least Concern by the South African National Biodiversity Institute. Although the species is presently known only from one sex, it has a wide geographical range. There are no significant threats to the species. It is protected in several protected areas including Addo Elephant National Park, Mountain Zebra National Park, De Hoop Nature Reserve, Bontebok National Park, and Cederberg Wilderness Area.

== Taxonomy ==
The species has not been revised and is known only from the female, with the epigyne illustrated. An undescribed male has been seen at Jeffreysbay.
