= Izithunzi lina =

Scientific classification
- Kingdom: Animalia
- Phylum: Arthropoda
- Subphylum: Chelicerata
- Class: Arachnida
- Order: Araneae
- Infraorder: Araneomorphae
- Family: Drymusidae
- Genus: Izithunzi
- Species: I. lina

Binomial name
- Izithunzi lina Labarque, Pérez-González & Griswold, 2018

Species of spider

Izithunzi lina is a species of spider in the family Drymusidae. It is endemic to the Western Cape of South Africa, where it is known only from the Fernkloof Nature Reserve and Kogelberg Nature Reserve.

== Etymology ==
The specific name lina is a name in apposition honouring Brazilian arachnologist Lina Maria Almeida-Silva, who collected part of the type series.

== Distribution and habitat ==
Izithunzi lina is found in the Western Cape Province of South Africa, with a very restricted distribution between Fernkloof Nature Reserve and Hermanus.

The species inhabits the fynbos biome and is considered a habitat specialist. It has been found in holes measuring 200-300 mm wide and 500-1000 mm deep made in clay sand boulders, as well as in riparian vegetation.

== Description ==
Izithunzi lina is a cryptic species that constructs loosely spun space webs, sometimes with sheet- or tube-like extensions.

=== Female ===
Females have a total length of 12.4 mm. The leg formula is 1423, with the first leg being the longest at 42.94 mm total length.

The thoracic area has darkish lateral margins and a central V-shaped pattern. The chelicerae have five bracket setae on the promargin and a row of seven macrosetae against the triangular lamina. The opisthosoma is overall dark brown with thick chevron patterns extending anteriorly, with the first two chevrons forming a continuum.

Females can be distinguished from the related Izithunzi capense by their epigastrium being densely covered with long, thick, dark setae, and their vulval plates being pressed together anteriorly.

=== Male ===
Males are smaller than females, with a total length of 8.56 mm.

Males have four bracket setae on the cheliceral promargin and six to seven macrosetae against the triangular lamina. The pedipalps have a prolateral femoral thorn that is distally acute, and the copulatory bulb has an elongated apex that is broad distally.

Males can be distinguished from I. capense by having an indented transition between the base and apex of the copulatory bulb, with the apex being twice as long as the base and heavily sclerotized with a broad tip.

== Conservation ==
Izithunzi lina is listed as rare due to its small, restricted distribution range. The species is currently protected within Fernkloof Nature Reserve and Kogelberg Nature Reserve, both protected areas in the fynbos biome. Additional sampling has been recommended to better understand the species' distribution and conservation needs.
