= Scytodes leipoldti =

Scientific classification
- Kingdom: Animalia
- Phylum: Arthropoda
- Subphylum: Chelicerata
- Class: Arachnida
- Order: Araneae
- Infraorder: Araneomorphae
- Family: Scytodidae
- Genus: Scytodes
- Species: S. leipoldti

Binomial name
- Scytodes leipoldti Purcell, 1904

Species of spider

Scytodes leipoldti is a species of spider in the family Scytodidae. It is endemic to South Africa.

== Distribution ==
Scytodes leipoldti is recorded from two provinces in South Africa: the Northern Cape and Western Cape. It has been found at Namaqua National Park and Clanwilliam. The species is found at elevations ranging from 78 to 199 m above sea level.

== Habitat and ecology ==
Scytodes leipoldti are wandering spiders commonly collected from under stones and in dark places on the soil surface in the Fynbos and Succulent Karoo biomes.

== Description ==
The carapace has two narrow curved stripes on each side of the yellow median stripe.

== Conservation ==
Scytodes leipoldti is listed as Data Deficient for taxonomic reasons. The status of the species remains obscure. Threats to the species are unknown. More sampling is needed to collect the male and to determine the species' range.

== Taxonomy ==
The species has not been revised and is known only from a female. A male has been collected but needs to be described.
