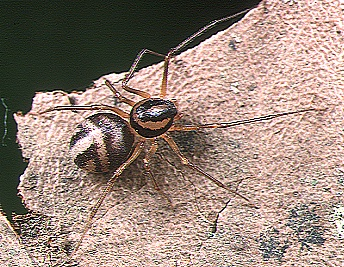
- Female
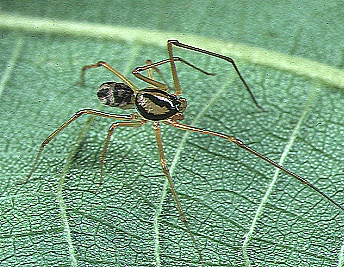
- Male

Scientific classification
- Kingdom: Animalia
- Phylum: Arthropoda
- Subphylum: Chelicerata
- Class: Arachnida
- Order: Araneae
- Infraorder: Araneomorphae
- Family: Scytodidae
- Genus: Scytodes
- Species: S. fusca

Binomial name
- Scytodes fusca Walckenaer, 1837

Synonyms
- Scytodes domestica Doleschall, 1859; Scytodes guianensis Taczanowski, 1872; Scytodes vittata Keyserling, 1877; Dictis fumida Thorell, 1891; Scytodes hebraica Simon, 1892; Scytodes bajula Simon, 1892; Scytodes campinensis Mello-Leitão, 1918; Scytodes discolor Mello-Leitão, 1918; Scytodes iguassuensis Mello-Leitão, 1918; Scytodes nannipes Chamberlin & Ivie, 1936; Scytodes torquatus Kraus, 1955

= Scytodes fusca =

Species of spider

Scytodes fusca is a species of spider in the family Scytodidae. It is commonly known as the dark common spitting spider and is a cosmopolitan species that has been introduced to numerous regions worldwide.

== Distribution ==
Scytodes fusca is a cosmopolitan species described by Walckenaer in 1837. Originally from Central and southern America, it has been introduced St. Helena, Europe, Africa, Seychelles, India, Myanmar, Indonesia, China, Japan, and Hawaii.

In South Africa, it is recorded from six provinces and is found at elevations ranging from 16 to 1,618 m above sea level.

== Habitat and ecology ==
This is a species frequently found in houses. They are nocturnal cursorial spiders and have a specialized way of catching prey. In South Africa, the species has been sampled from the Fynbos, Grassland, Nama Karoo, Savanna, and Thicket biomes.

== Description ==
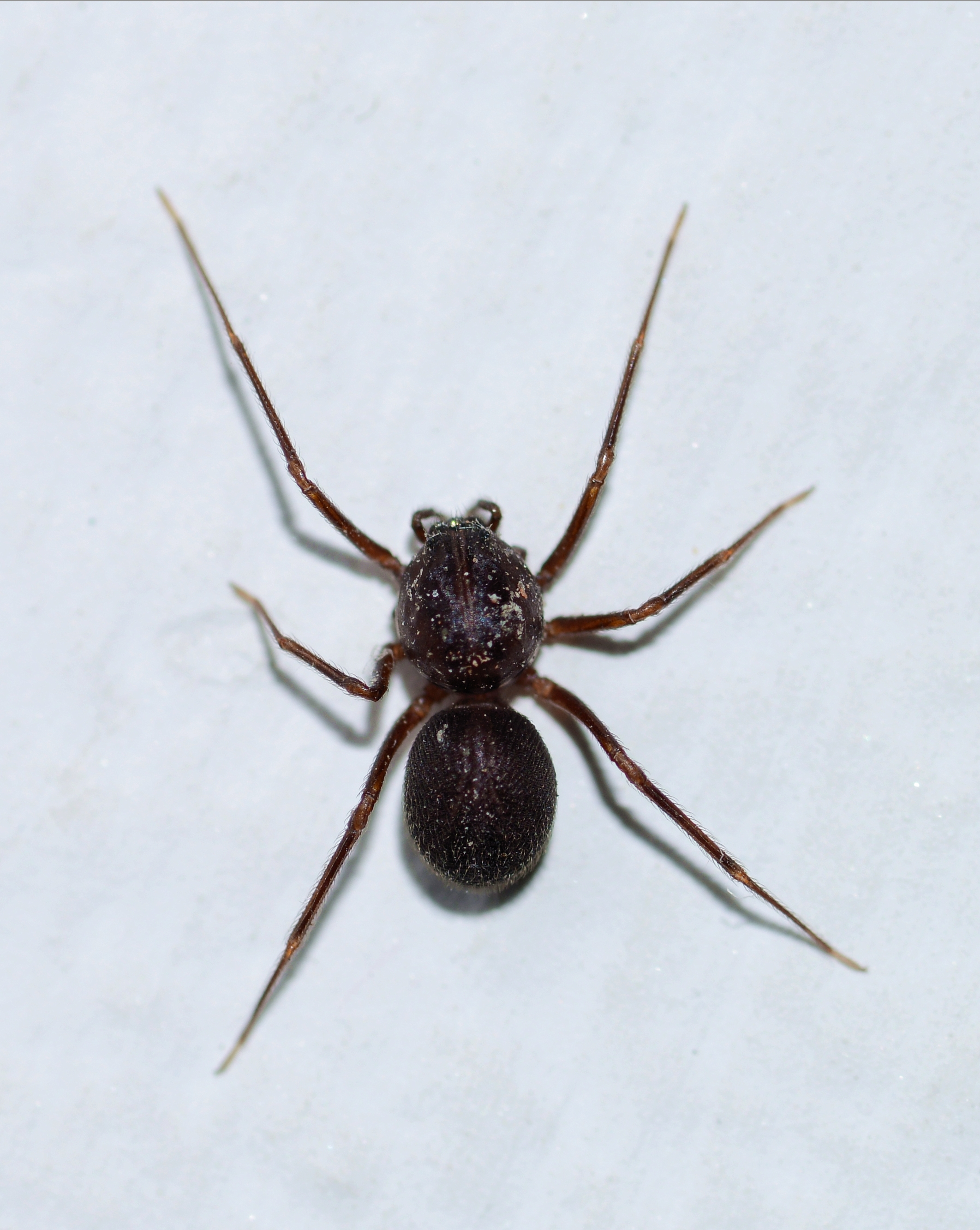
missing legs

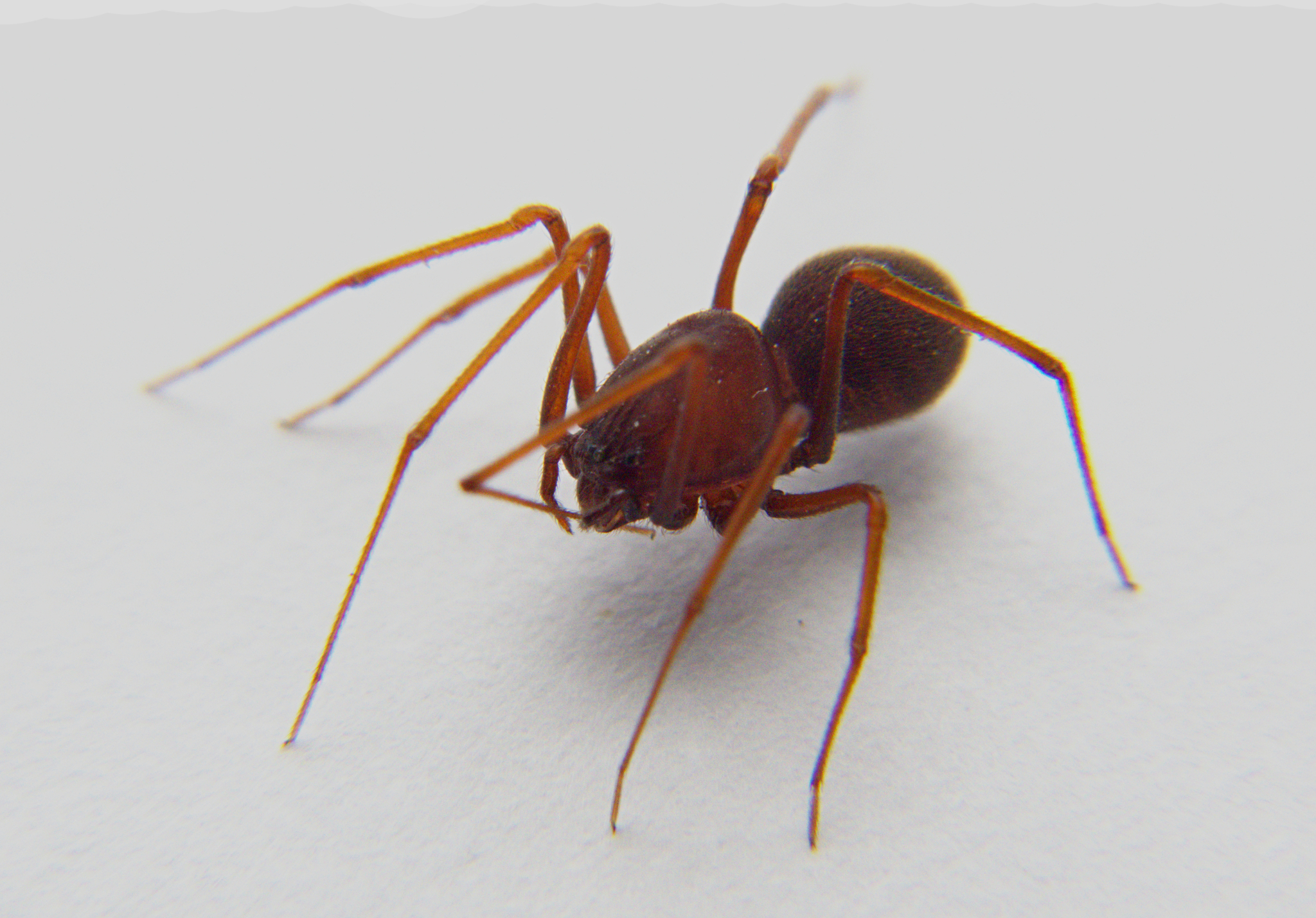

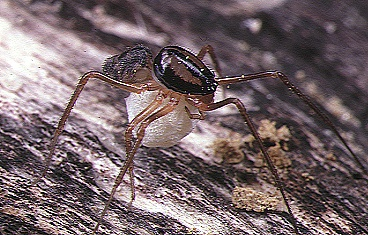
female with egg sac

== Conservation ==
Scytodes fusca is listed as Least Concern by the South African National Biodiversity Institute due to its wide range. There are no significant threats to the species. It is protected in Karoo National Park and Kruger National Park.

== Taxonomy ==
This is an introduced cosmopolitan species known from both sexes, which have been illustrated.
