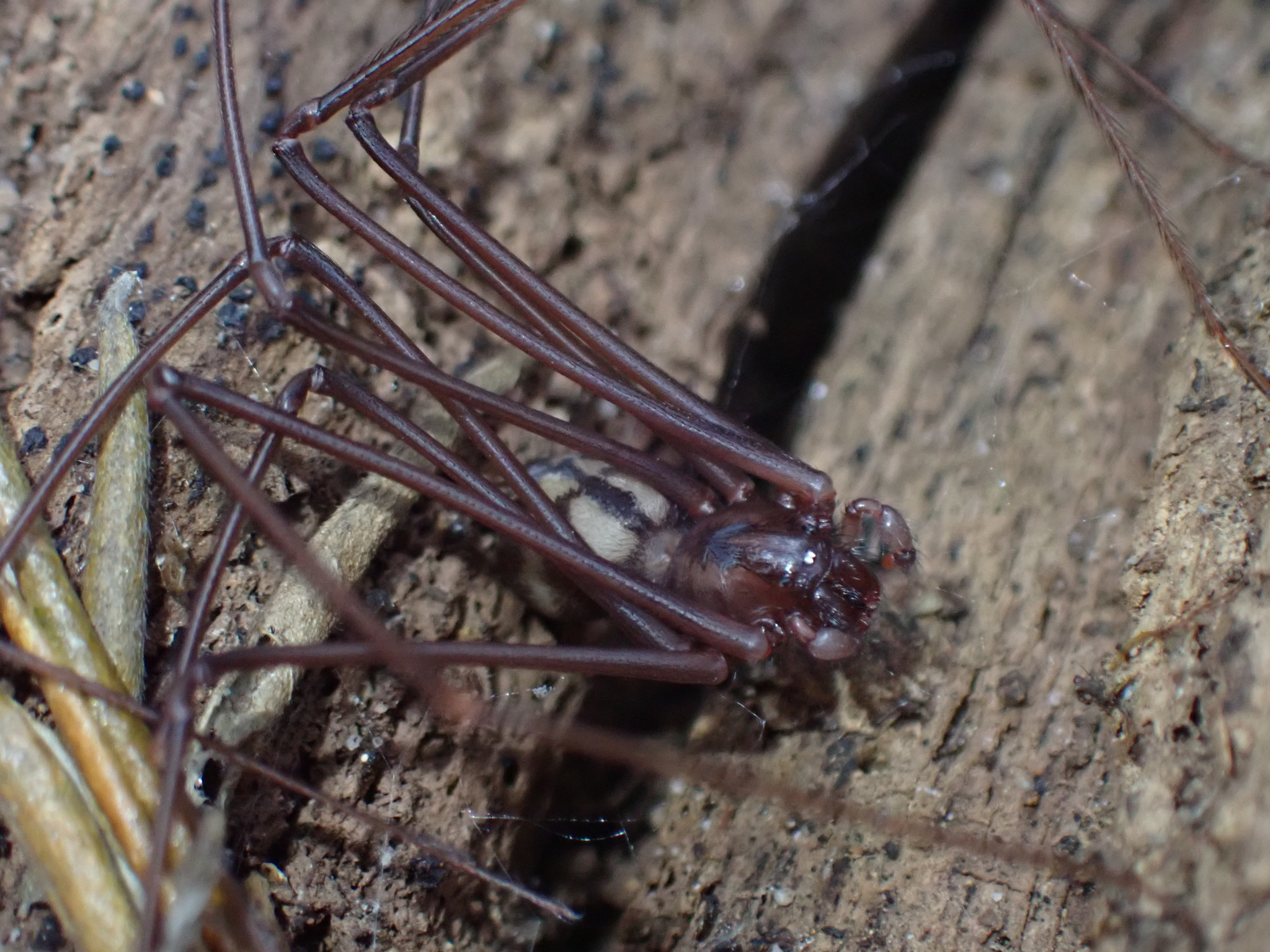
- I. capense
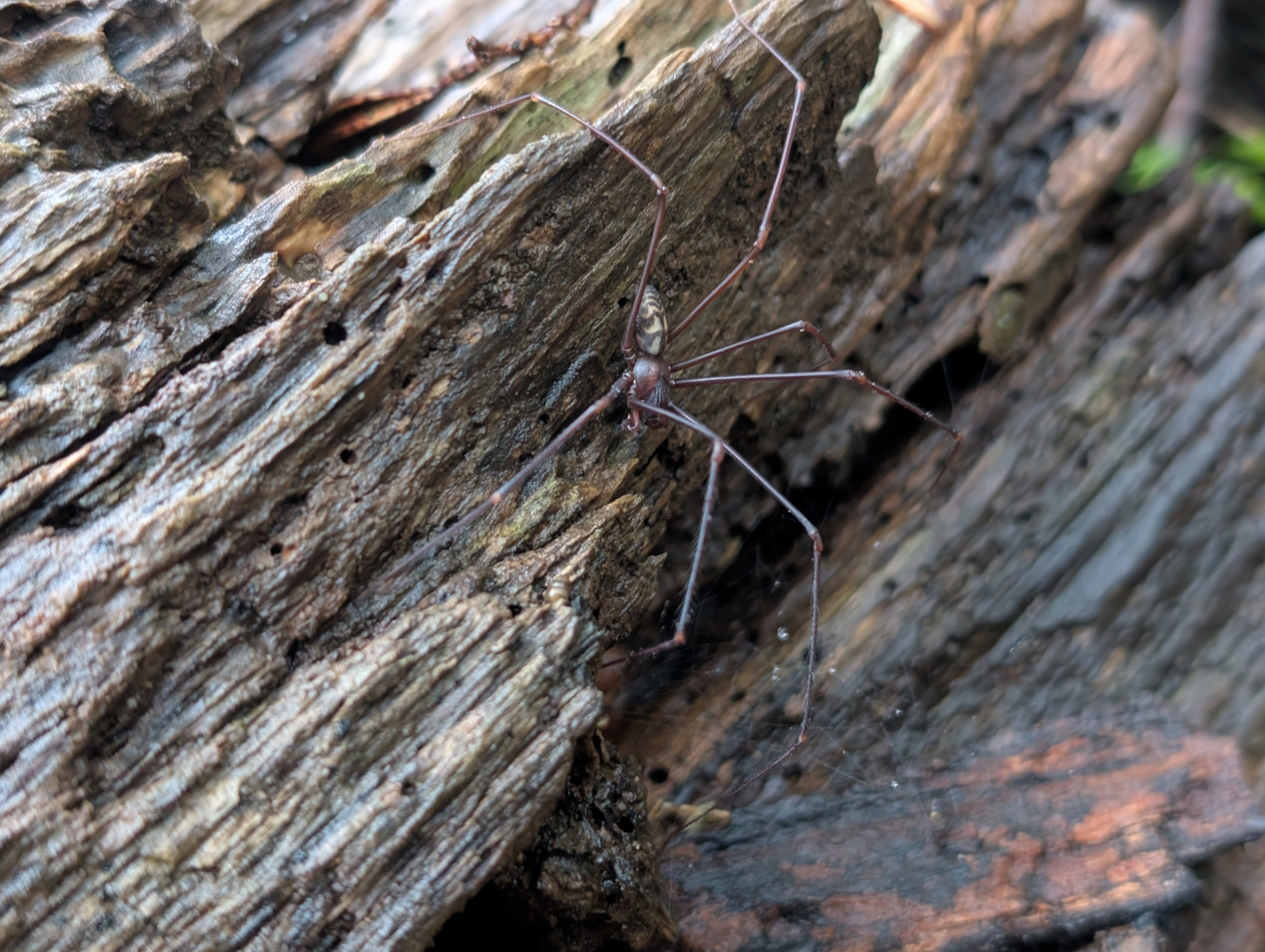
- I. capense

Scientific classification
- Kingdom: Animalia
- Phylum: Arthropoda
- Subphylum: Chelicerata
- Class: Arachnida
- Order: Araneae
- Infraorder: Araneomorphae
- Family: Drymusidae
- Genus: Izithunzi; Labarque, Pérez-González & Griswold, 2018

Type species
- I. capense (Simon, 1893)

Species
- 5, see text

= Izithunzi =

Genus of spiders

Izithunzi is a genus of false violin spiders first described by F. M. Labarque, A. Pérez-González, and Charles Edward Griswold in 2018.

== Species ==
As of October 2025, this genus includes five species:

- Izithunzi capense (Simon, 1893) – South Africa (type species)
- Izithunzi lina Labarque, Pérez-González & Griswold, 2018 – South Africa
- Izithunzi productum (Purcell, 1904) – South Africa
- Izithunzi silvicola (Purcell, 1904) – South Africa
- Izithunzi zondii Labarque, Pérez-González & Griswold, 2018 – South Africa
