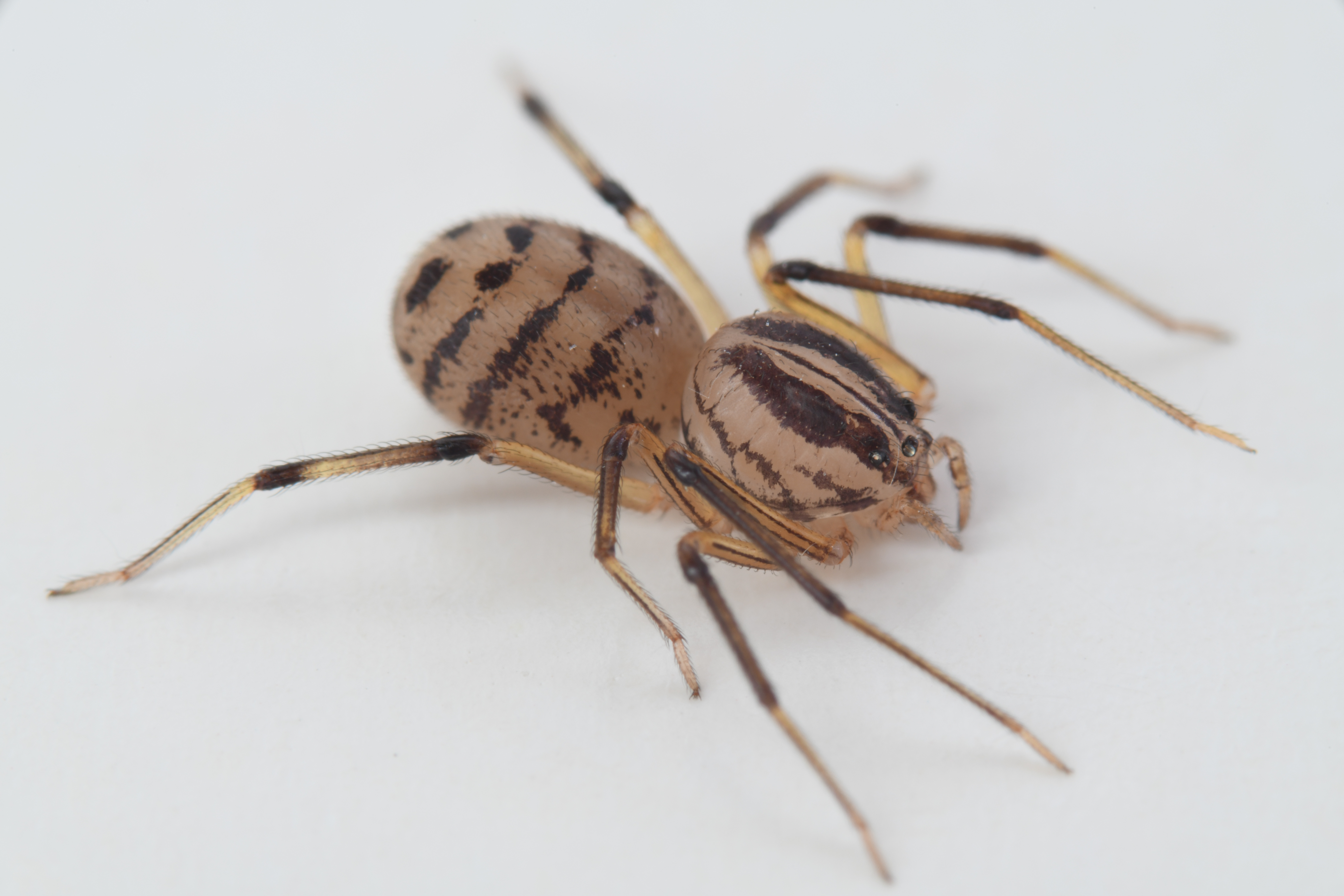
- Dictis striatipes

Scientific classification
- Kingdom: Animalia
- Phylum: Arthropoda
- Subphylum: Chelicerata
- Class: Arachnida
- Order: Araneae
- Infraorder: Araneomorphae
- Family: Scytodidae
- Genus: Dictis; L. Koch, 1872

Type species
- D. striatipes L. Koch, 1872

Species
- 7, see text

Synonyms
- Soeuria Saristo, 1997

= Dictis =

Genus of spiders

Dictis is a genus of spitting spiders that was first described by Ludwig Carl Christian Koch in 1872.

== Species ==
As of January 2024 it contains seven species, found in Asia, Oceania, North America and Seychelles:

- Dictis edwardsi Barrion, Barrion-Dupo & Heong, 2013 – China
- Dictis elongata Dankittipakul & Singtripop, 2010 – Thailand, Laos
- Dictis oranhutan Fomichev & Omelko, 2023 – Indonesia
- Dictis soeur (Saaristo, 1997) – Seychelles
- Dictis striatipes L. Koch, 1872 (type) – Yemen, United Arab Emirates, Iran, tropical Asia, Korea, Japan, China to Australia, Pacific Isles. Introduced to USA, Mexico
- Dictis thailandica Dankittipakul & Singtripop, 2010 – Thailand
- Dictis uncata Wu, M. Y. Zhang, M. M. Zhang & Yang, 2023 – China

== Behaviour and Ecology ==
They are active hunters, and can be observed freely roaming in the foliage or on the forest floor. They prey on large ants and other spiders.
