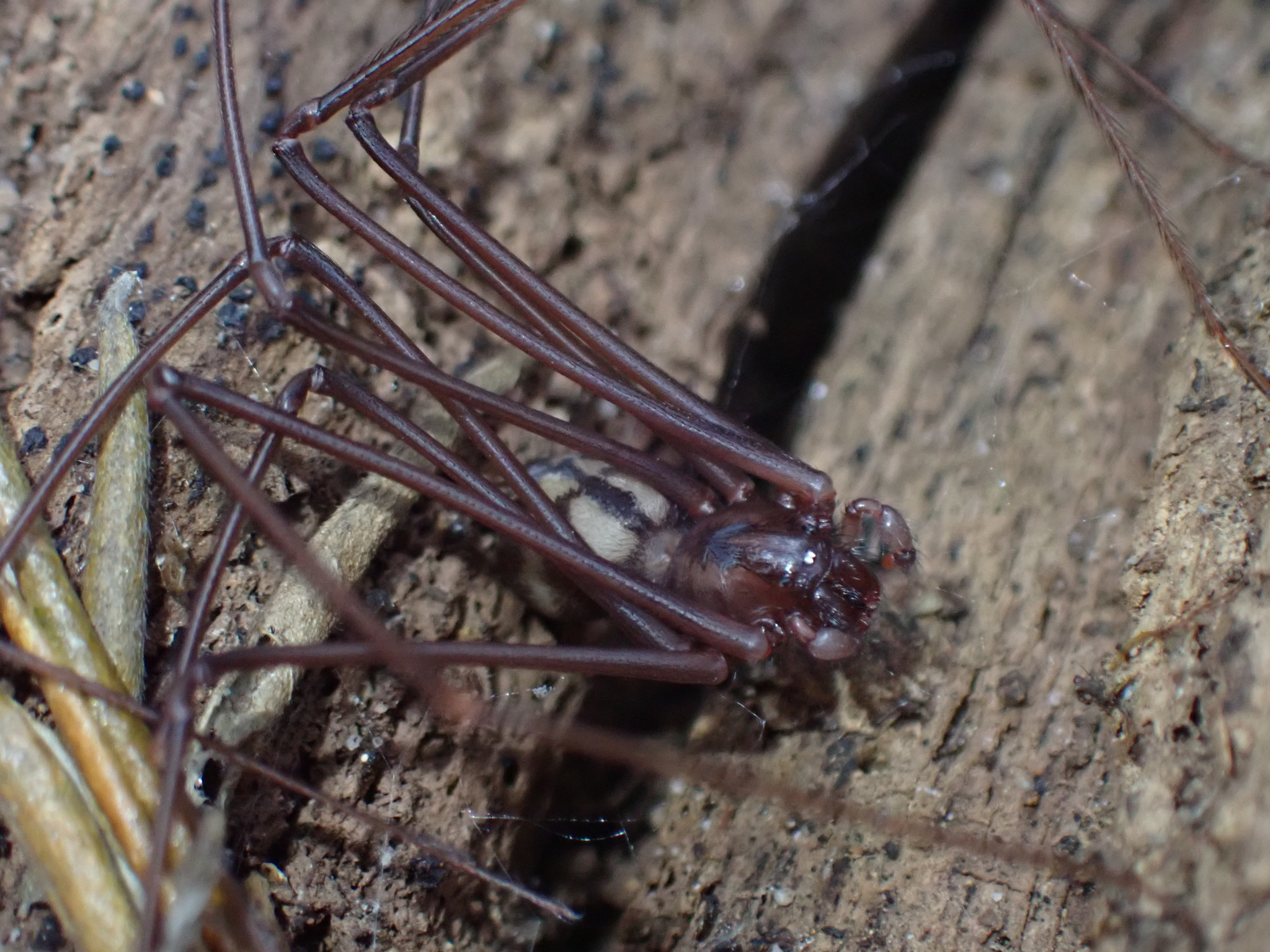

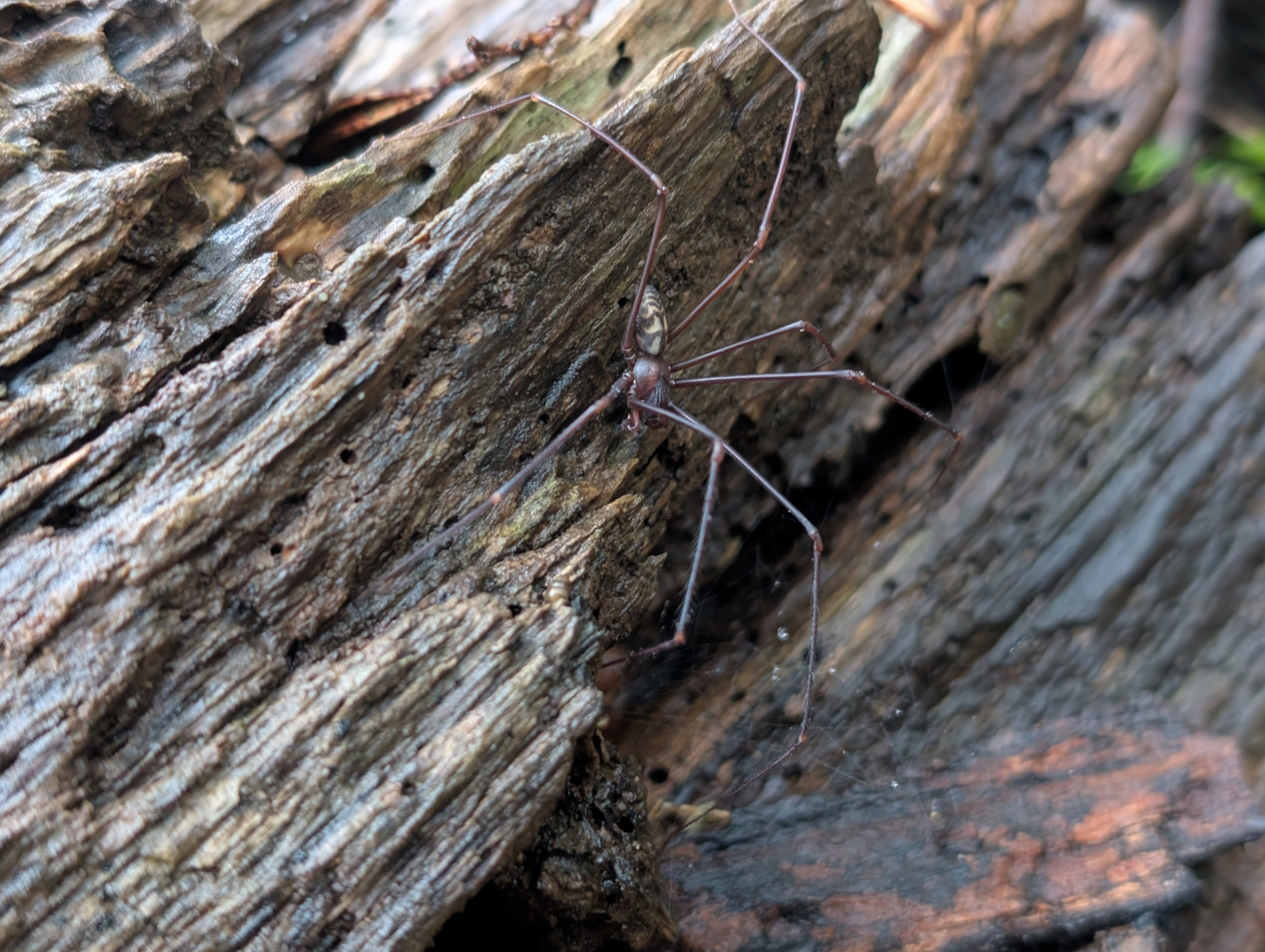

Conservation status
- Data Deficient (IUCN 3.1)

Scientific classification
- Kingdom: Animalia
- Phylum: Arthropoda
- Subphylum: Chelicerata
- Class: Arachnida
- Order: Araneae
- Infraorder: Araneomorphae
- Family: Drymusidae
- Genus: Izithunzi
- Species: I. capense

Binomial name
- Izithunzi capense (Simon, 1893)

Synonyms
- Drymusa capensis Simon, 1893; Loxosceles valida Lawrence, 1964; Drymusa valida (Lawrence, 1964)

= Izithunzi capense =

Species of spider

Izithunzi capense is a species of spider in the family Drymusidae. It is endemic to the Western Cape province of South Africa.

== Etymology ==
The specific name capense refers to the Cape Peninsula, where the species was first discovered by Simon.

== Distribution ==
Izithunzi capense is endemic to the Western Cape Province of South Africa, with a distribution range extending from Table Mountain National Park to Kalk Bay and surrounding areas. The species has been recorded from several protected areas including Kogelberg Nature Reserve, Kirstenbosch National Botanical Garden, and Table Mountain National Park. It occurs at elevations ranging from 21 to 738 metres above sea level.

== Habitat ==
Izithunzi capense is found in cool, shaded environments, typically under exfoliated bark or in crevices between boulders. The spiders construct loose space webs, sometimes with sheet- or tube-like extensions, beneath which they hang. They inhabit Afromontane forest, pine plantations, and caves within the Fynbos biome. The species is sensitive to light and quickly retreats to darkness when exposed to illumination.

== Description ==
Females of Izithunzi capense are notably larger than males, with a total length of approximately 15 mm compared to 12 mm in males.

The opisthosoma displays a distinctive coloration pattern with dark brown chevrons extending anteriorly. These chevrons are well-spaced at the front and clustered towards the rear, with the first two forming a continuous pattern. The thoracic area shows darkish lateral margins and a central V-shaped pattern that forms a continuum.

The chelicerae of females have five bracket setae on the promargin and a row of seven to eight macrosetae positioned against a triangular lamina. The pedipalps feature a prolateral femoral thorn that is distally acute. Leg coloration shows femora and tibiae as dun-colored, while patellae, metatarsi and tarsi are tan.

Males can be distinguished by their modified chelicerae, where the fang is excavated both promarginally and distally. The promarginal and retromarginal cheliceral teeth near the fang base are extremely modified, enlarged, and flattened to fit into the fang's excavation. The male copulatory bulb shows a smooth transition between base and apex, with the apex being 1½ times longer than the base and featuring an acute, slightly curved tip.

== Taxonomy ==
Izithunzi capense was originally described as Drymusa capensis by Eugène Simon in 1893. The species was later transferred to the genus Izithunzi by Labarque, Pérez-González & Griswold in 2018 following molecular phylogenetic analysis. Loxosceles valida, described by Lawrence in 1964 from cave specimens around Cape Town, is now considered a junior synonym of I. capense.

== Conservation status ==
Izithunzi capense is classified as rare with a conservation status of Data Deficient according to IUCN Red List criteria. Despite its restricted range, the species faces no direct threats and occurs in several protected areas. Additional sampling is needed to better determine its full distribution range.
