= Stedocys =

Scientific classification
- Kingdom: Animalia
- Phylum: Arthropoda
- Subphylum: Chelicerata
- Class: Arachnida
- Order: Araneae
- Infraorder: Araneomorphae
- Family: Scytodidae
- Genus: Stedocys; Ono, 1995

Type species
- S. uenorum Ono, 1995

Species
- 13, see text

Genus of spiders

Stedocys is a genus of Asian spitting spiders that was first described by H. Ono in 1995.

== Species ==
As of January 2024 it contains thirteen species, found in Asia:

- S. amamiensis Suguro, 2019 — Japan
- S. gaolingensis Wu & Li, 2017 — China
- S. huangniuensis Wu & Li, 2017 — China
- S. leopoldi Giltay, 1935 — Malaysia, Thailand
- S. ludiyanensis Wu & Li, 2017 — China
- S. matuoensis Wu & Li, 2017 — China
- S. pagodas Labarque, Grismado, Ramírez, Yan & Griswold, 2009 — China
- S. pulianensis Wu & Li, 2017 — China
- S. shilinensis Wu & Li, 2017 — China (Hainan)
- S. uenorum Ono, 1995 (type) — Thailand
- S. vittiformis Chen, Liang, Yin, Xu & Wei, 2021 — China
- S. xiangzhouensis Wu & Li, 2017 — China
- S. xianrenensis Wu & Li, 2017 — China
