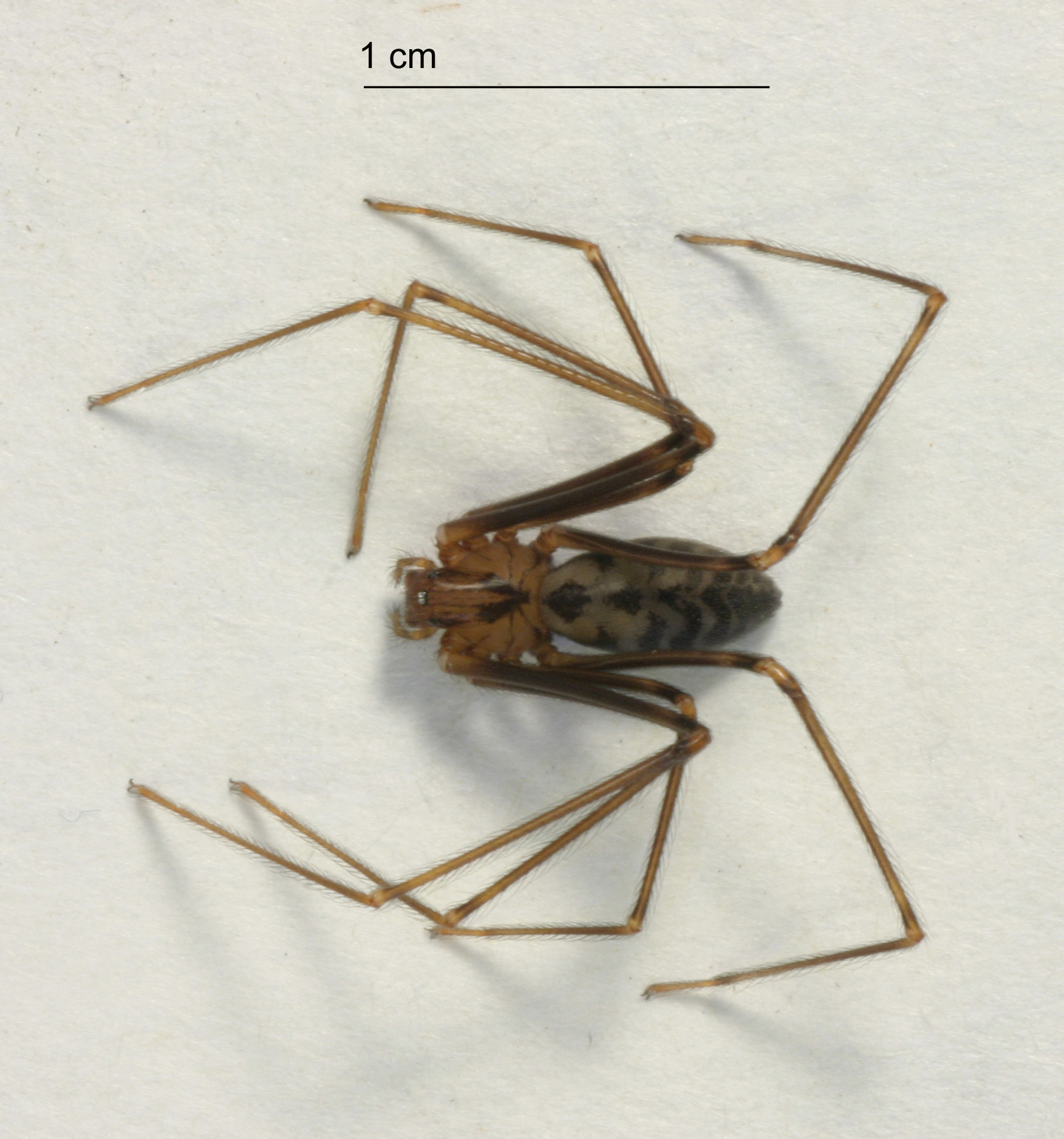
- Drymusa sp.

Scientific classification
- Kingdom: Animalia
- Phylum: Arthropoda
- Subphylum: Chelicerata
- Class: Arachnida
- Order: Araneae
- Infraorder: Araneomorphae
- Family: Drymusidae
- Genus: Drymusa; Simon, 1892

Type species
- D. nubila Simon, 1892

Species
- 12, see text

= Drymusa =

Genus of spiders

Drymusa is a genus of false violin spiders that was first described by Eugène Simon in 1892. They physically resemble violin spiders (Loxosceles), but their bites are not believed to be medically significant. Originally placed with the spitting spiders, it was moved to the Loxoscelidae (now a synonym for Sicariidae) in 1981, then to the Drymusidae in 1986.

== Species ==
They occur in the Caribbean and South America. As of May 2019 it contains twelve species:

- Drymusa armasi Alayón, 1981 – Cuba
- Drymusa canhemabae Brescovit, Bonaldo & Rheims, 2004 – Brazil
- Drymusa colligata Bonaldo, Rheims & Brescovit, 2006 – Brazil
- Drymusa dinora Valerio, 1971 – Costa Rica
- Drymusa nubila Simon, 1892 (type) – St. Vincent
- Drymusa philomatica Bonaldo, Rheims & Brescovit, 2006 – Brazil
- Drymusa rengan Labarque & Ramírez, 2007 – Chile
- Drymusa serrana Goloboff & Ramírez, 1992 – Argentina
- Drymusa simoni Bryant, 1948 – Hispaniola
- Drymusa spectata Alayón, 1981 – Cuba
- Drymusa spelunca Bonaldo, Rheims & Brescovit, 2006 – Brazil
- Drymusa tobyi Bonaldo, Rheims & Brescovit, 2006 – Brazil
