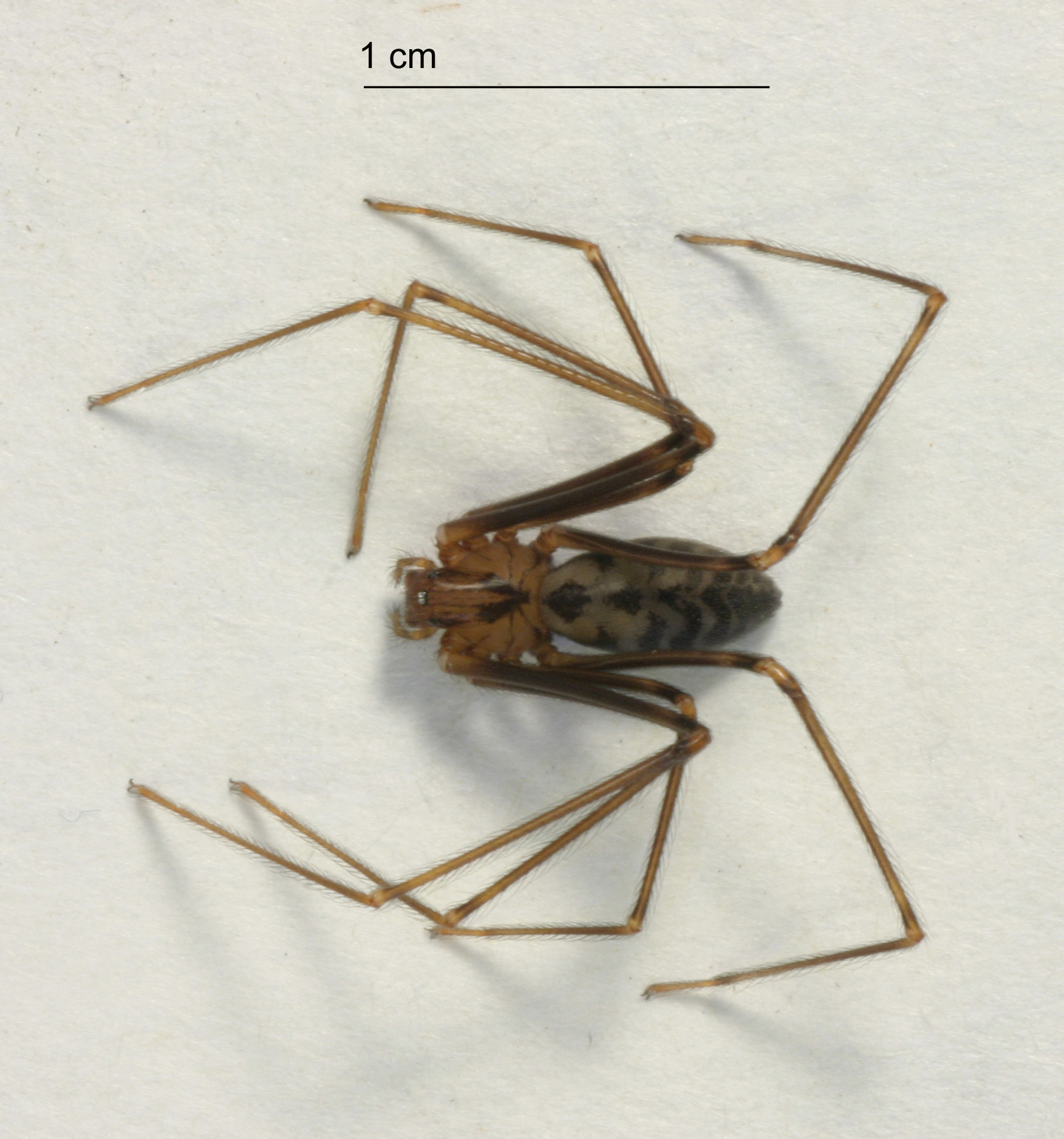
- Drymusa sp.
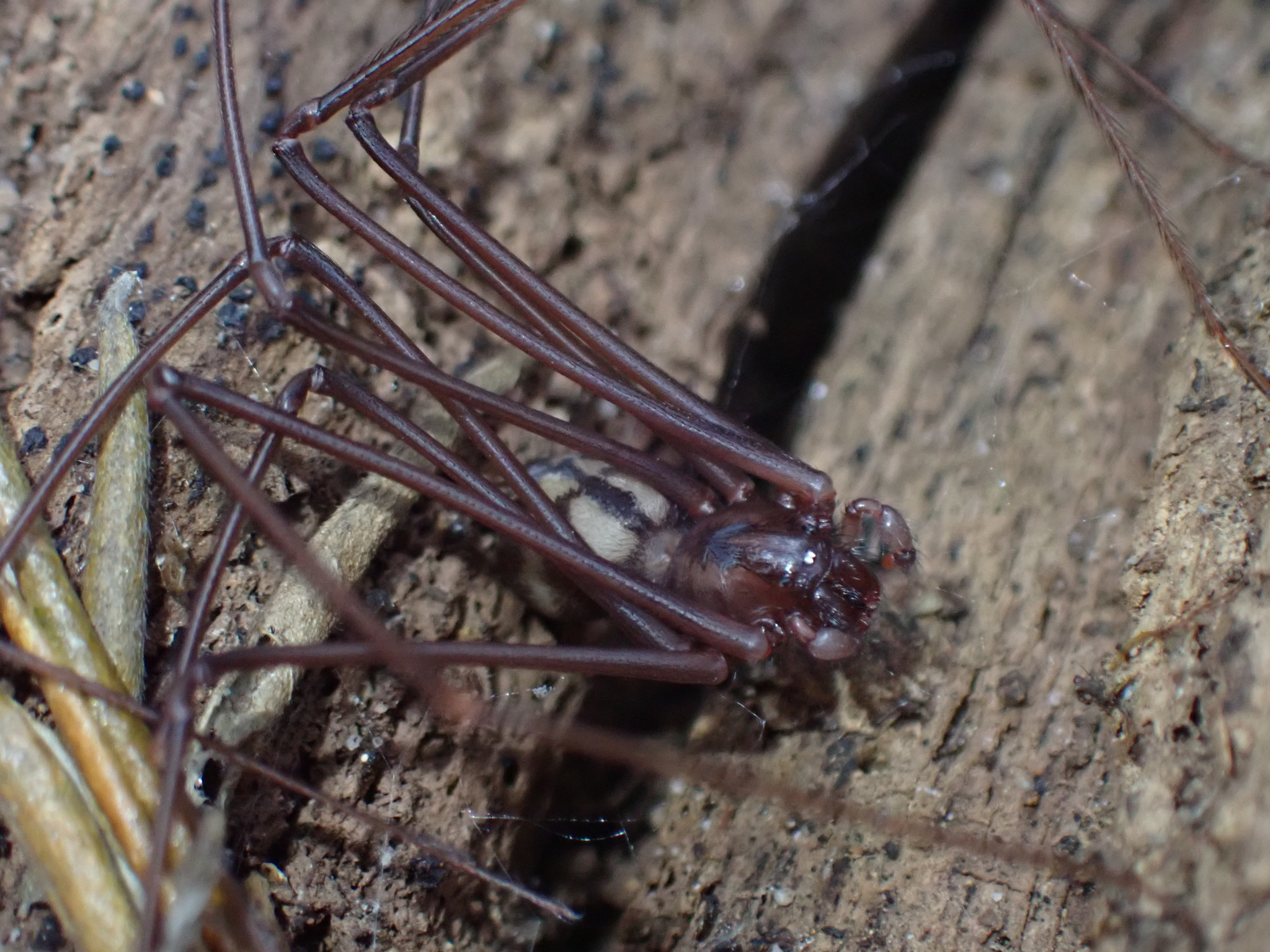
- Izithunzi capense from South Africa

Scientific classification
- Kingdom: Animalia
- Phylum: Arthropoda
- Subphylum: Chelicerata
- Class: Arachnida
- Order: Araneae
- Infraorder: Araneomorphae
- Family: Drymusidae; Simon, 1893

Genera
- Drymusa Simon, 1892; Izithunzi Labarque, Pérez-González & Griswold, 2018

Diversity
- 2 genera, 19 species
- blue: reported countries (WSC) green: observation hotspots (iNaturalist)

= Drymusidae =

False violin spiders

Family of spiders

Drymusidae is a family of araneomorph spiders first described by Eugène Simon in 1893, and elevated to family status by Pekka T. Lehtinen in 1986.

== Genera ==
As of January 2026, this family includes two genera and nineteen species:

- Drymusa Simon, 1892 – Cuba, Haiti, St. Vincent, Costa Rica, South America
- Izithunzi Labarque, Pérez-González & Griswold, 2018 – South Africa
