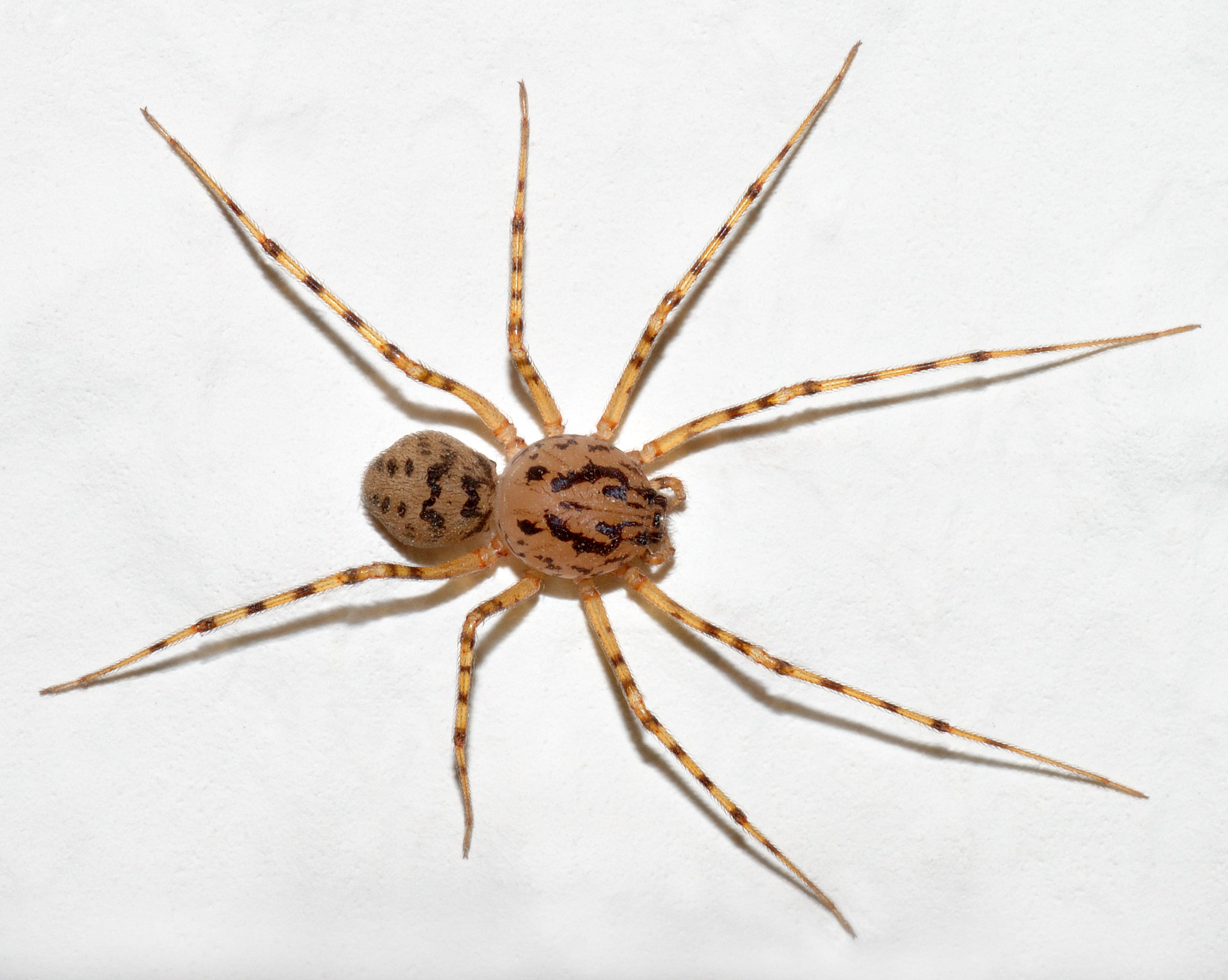
- Scytodes thoracica
- Dictis striatipes spitting

Scientific classification
- Kingdom: Animalia
- Phylum: Arthropoda
- Subphylum: Chelicerata
- Class: Arachnida
- Order: Araneae
- Infraorder: Araneomorphae
- Family: Scytodidae; Blackwall, 1864

Diversity
- 4 genera, 253 species
- blue: reported countries (WSC) green: observation hotspots (iNaturalist)

= Spitting spider =

Spitting spiders Temporal range: Cretaceous–present

Family of spiders

Spitting spiders are a family of araneomorph spiders, the family Scytodidae, first described by John Blackwall in 1864. It contains over 250 species in four genera, of which Scytodes is the best-known.

== Description ==
Scytodidae spiders are haplogyne, meaning they lack hardened female genitalia. They have six eyes, like most spiders in this group, arranged in three pairs. They possess long legs and a dome-shaped cephalothorax, and are usually yellow or light brown with black spots or marks.

== Hunting technique ==
Scytodidae catch their prey by spitting a fluid that congeals on contact into a venomous and sticky mass. The fluid contains both venom and spider silk in liquid form, though it is produced in venom glands in the chelicerae. The venom-laced silk both immobilizes and envenoms prey such as silverfish. In high-speed footage the spiders can be observed swaying from side to side as they "spit", catching the prey in a criss-crossed "Z" pattern; it is criss-crossed because each of the chelicerae emits half of the pattern. The spider usually strikes from a distance of 10 to 20 millimetres (0.39 to 0.79 in) and the entire attack sequence only lasts 1/700th of a second. After making the capture, the spider typically bites the prey with venomous effect, and wraps it in the normal spider fashion with silk from the spinnerets.

== Presocial behaviour ==
Some species exhibit presocial behaviour, in which mature spiders live together and assist the young with food.

== Habitat and lifestyle ==
They are ground and plant dwellers, free-running and nocturnal spiders. They are found throughout the region in all biomes, usually collected from vegetation and from under stones and dark places on the soil surface.

== Genera ==
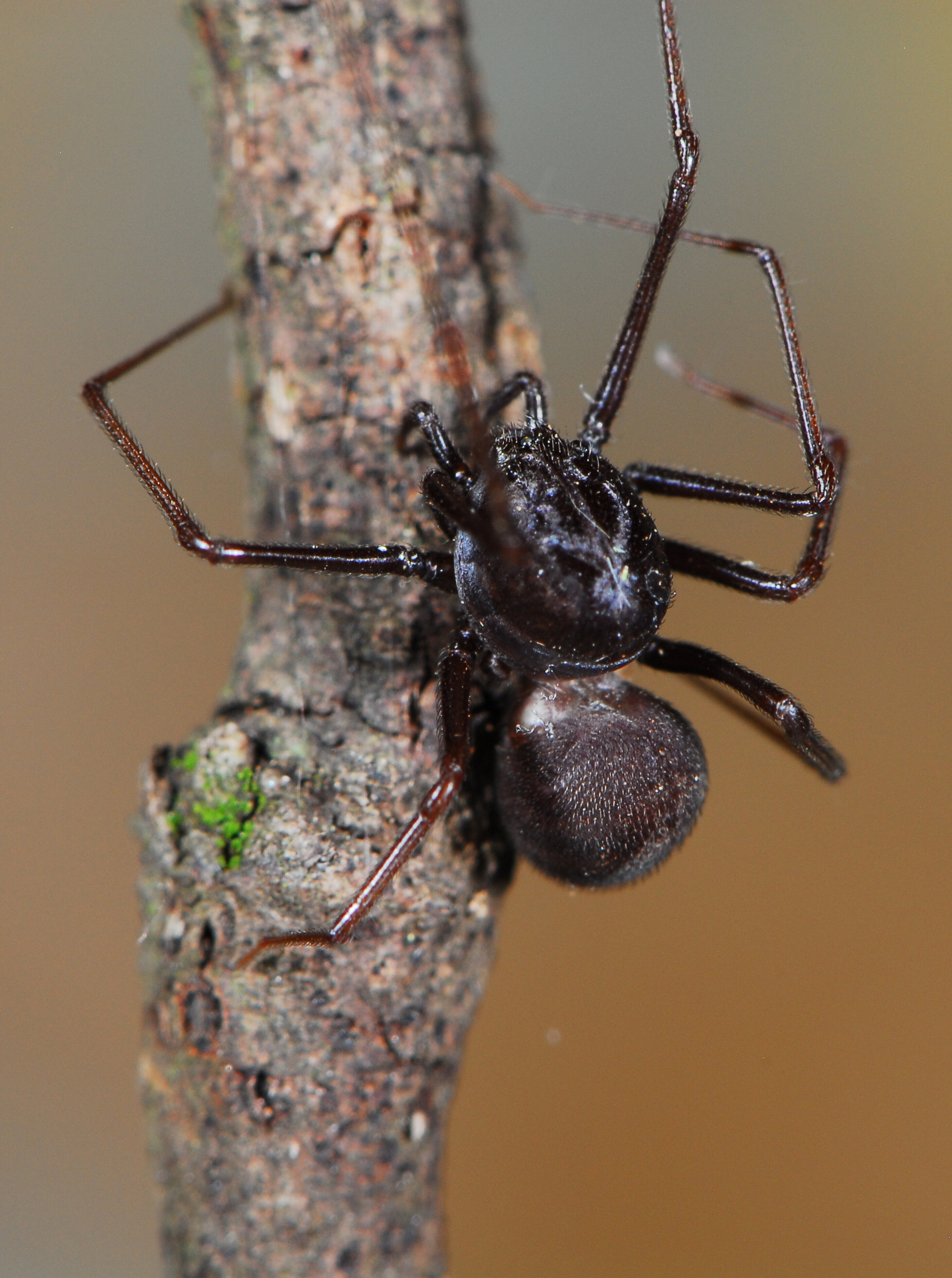
female Scytodes elizabethae

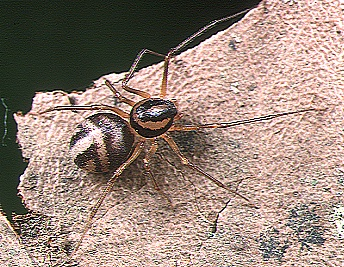
female Scytodes fusca

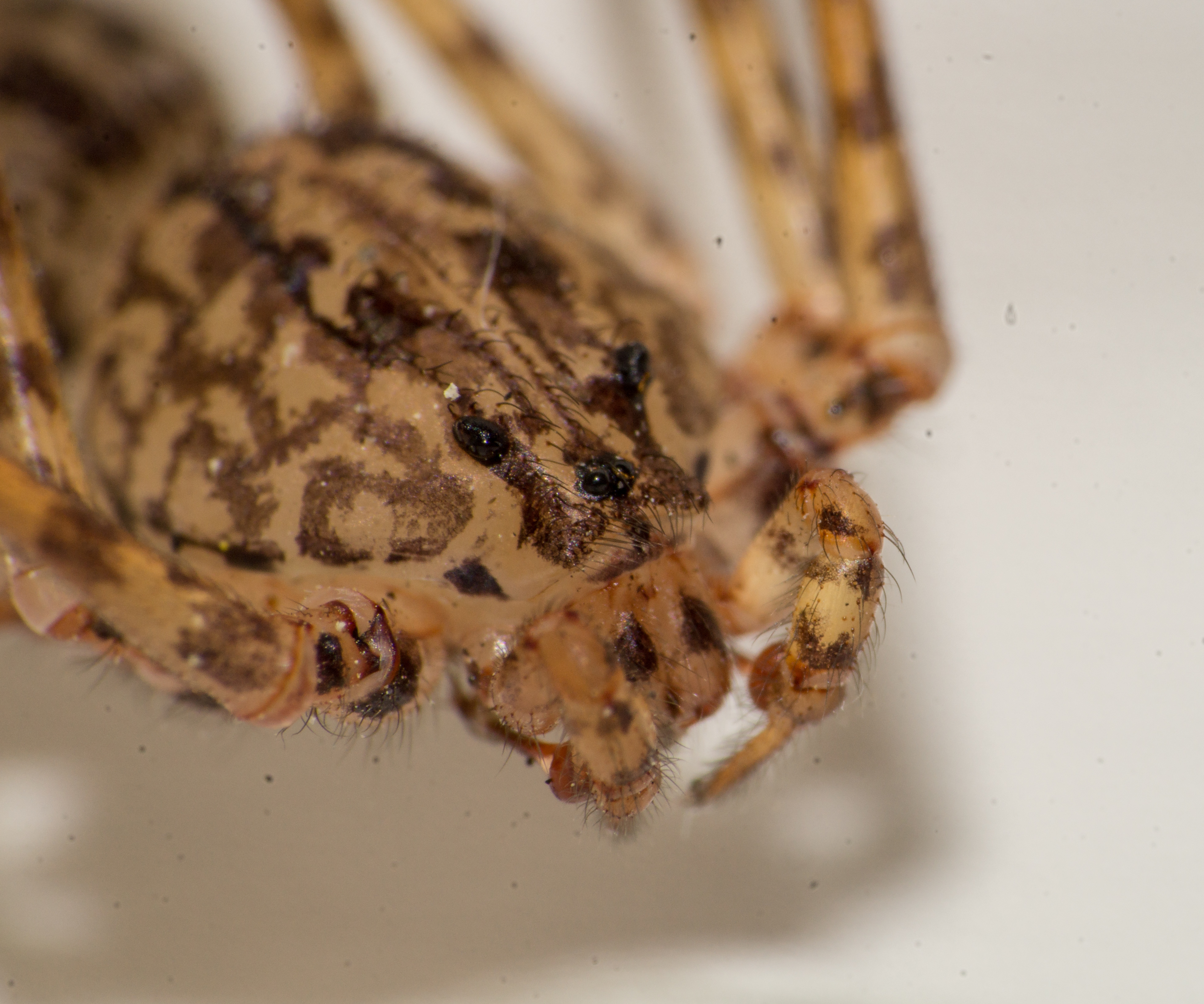
Scytodes globula

As of January 2026, this family includes four genera and 253 species:

- Dictis L. Koch, 1872 – Seychelles, Asia, Pacific Isles, tropical Asia. Introduced to Mexico, United States
- Scyloxes Dunin, 1992 – Tajikistan, Malaysia, Thailand
- Scytodes Latreille, 1804 – Africa, Asia, southern Europe, North to South America, Australia, New Guinea. Introduced worldwide
- Stedocys Ono, 1995 – China, Japan, Malaysia, Thailand
